= Regraga =

Regraga رگراگة / ⵔⴳⵔⴰⴳⴰ
- Tribal Confederation & Religious Brotherhood
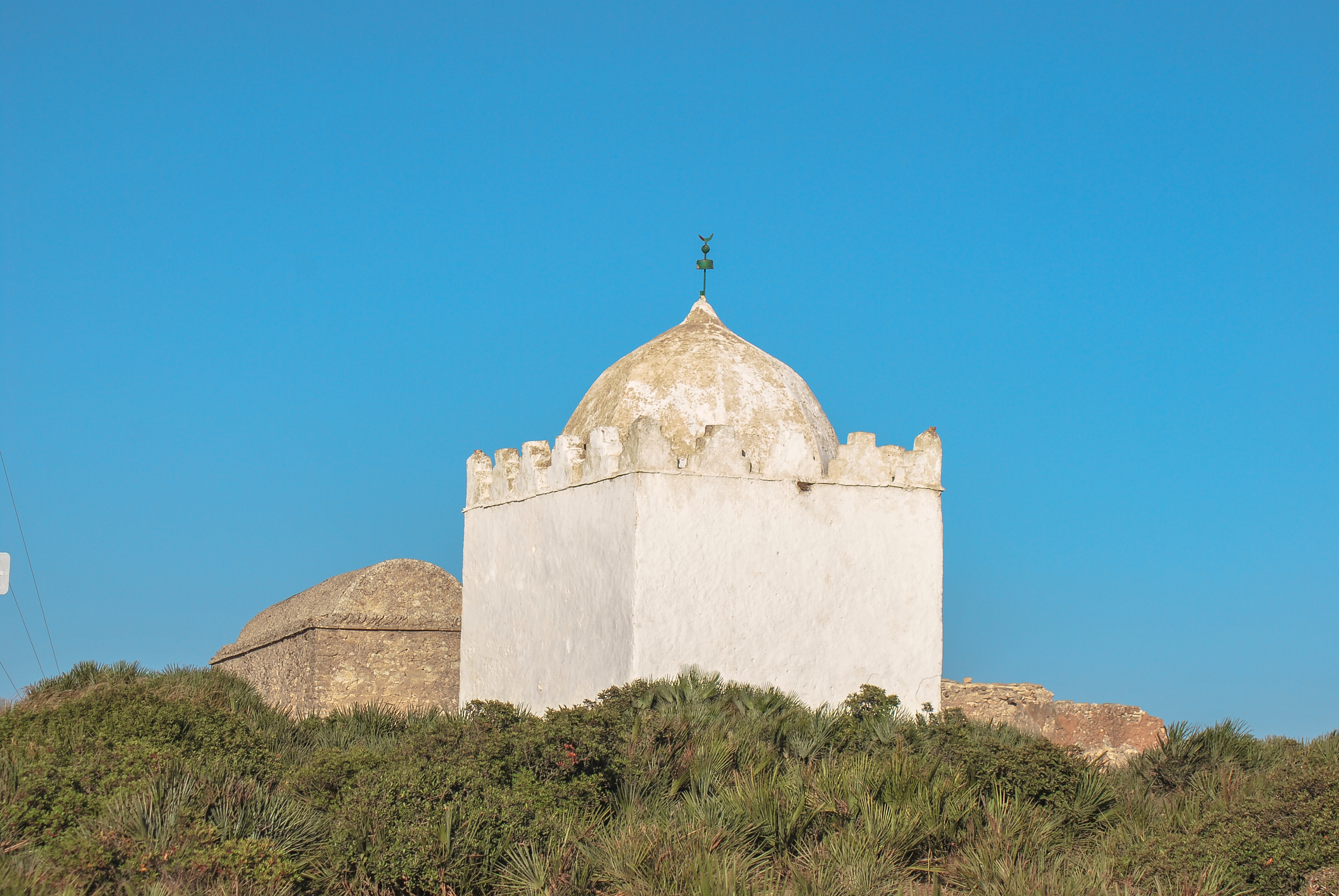
- Shrine of Sidi Ali Sayeh overlooking the atlantic sea at the foot of Jbel Lahdid.
- Country: Morocco
- Region: Marrakesh-Safi
- Province: Essaouira Province
- Founding Era: c. 7th Century (Pre-Conquest)
- Structure: Sufi Tribal Confederation
- Identity: Masmuda Berbers
- Spiritual capital based in Aquermoud.

Regraga (Arabic: ركراكة, romanized: Ragrāga; ⵔⴳⵔⴰⴳⴰ) is a historic Masmuda Berber tribal confederation and religious brotherhood (Tariqa) located in the Chiadma region of Morocco. Historically recognized as the "First Believers" of the Maghreb, the Regraga are famous for their annual 40-day pilgrimage, the Daour, which attracts millions of visitors and serves as a major socio-economic engine for the Essaouira Province.

Unlike typical Sufi orders founded by a single sheikh, the Regraga derive their authority from a collective group of ancestors known as the "Seven Saints" (Sebâatou Rijal), who are said to have converted to Islam directly from the Prophet Muhammad before the Arab conquest of North Africa.

== History and Origins ==
=== The Masmuda Connection ===
The Regraga are ethnically rooted in the Masmuda confederation, the sedentary Amazigh inhabitants of the High Atlas and Atlantic plains. They historically occupied the strategic interface between the Jbel Lahdid mountains and the ocean, acting as a buffer zone between the northern Arabized tribes and the Haha tribes of the south.

=== Christian and Arian Pre-History ===
Oral traditions and hagiographic texts suggest that prior to Islam, the Regraga were followers of a monotheistic faith, likely a local variation of Christianity or Arianism.

- The Apostles: Local legends often refer to the ancestors as Apostles (Hawariyyun), linking them spiritually to the lineage of Jesus (Sidna Aïssa) and John the Baptist (Sidi Yahya).
- The Roman Era: The region of Chiadma contains vestiges of Late Roman influence, and the Regraga's pre-Islamic status as a "holy tribe" likely granted them autonomy from Roman tax collectors.

=== The Legend of the Seven Saints ===
The foundational myth states that seven Berber wise men traveled from Morocco to Mecca during the lifetime of the Prophet Muhammad to verify his prophethood.

- The Naming: When they met the Prophet, he could not understand their Berber language, describing it as rajrajah (a rattle or commotion). The Prophet's daughter, Fatima az-Zahra, reportedly said, "They are speaking Regraga." The name stuck.
- The Mission: They were initiated into Islam and sent back to the Maghreb as the first "Companions" (Sahaba), tasked with spreading the faith long before the arrival of the Umayyad general Uqba ibn Nafi.

== The Seven Saints (Genealogy) ==
The spiritual authority of the confederation is held by seven specific lineages. The canonical list of the saints, including their patronymics (Bin meaning "Son of"), is as follows:

Name	Role/Attribute	Shrine Location
Sidi Ouasmen	Political leadership, Group sovereign, Symbol of resistance.	Jbel Lahdid
Sidi Boubaker Achmas	Ritual organization, Opening of the "Daour" season, Symbol of doctrinal transition.	Aquermoud
Sidi Salah bin Boubaker Achmas	Spiritual inheritance, Righteousness of progeny, Primary education.	Blad Houira
Sidi Abdallah Adnas	Defense of orthodoxy, Fighting heresy, Scholarly outpost (Ribat).	South of Oued Tensift
Sidi Issa Boukhabia	Guardian of water resources, Agricultural blessing (Baraka), Hospitality.	Banks of Oued Tensift
Sidi Said bin Yabqa	Miracles of healing and speed, Patron of travelers and the exhausted.	Tamazart (Tal'at al-Dimma)
Sidi Yaala bin Watel	Scholarly and military foundation, Link between coastal and inland tribes.	Ribat Shaker (Youssoufia Province)

== Geography: Jbel Lahdid ==
The spiritual heart of the Regraga is **Jbel Lahdid** (جبل حديد; "The Iron Mountain"), a limestone massif rising approximately 725 meters above sea level.

- Topography: The mountain dominates the northern horizon of Essaouira. The summit offers a strategic 360-degree panorama:
  - West: The vast expanse of the Atlantic Ocean and the Canary currents.
  - South/East: The outcome of the Tensift River and the distant peaks of the High Atlas.
- Ecology: The slopes are covered in a unique ecosystem of **Argan** trees, Thuja (Tetraclinis), and wild olive trees.
- Sacred Landscape: The mountain is not just a geographical feature but a "pole" (Qutb) of sanctity. It contains numerous caves used for spiritual retreats (Khalwa) and holds the shrines of the most ancient Regraga ancestors.

== Sufism and The Daour ==
The Regraga represent a solid hub of popular Sufism in Morocco. Their practices emphasize movement, community, and the tangible transmission of blessing (Barakah), rather than solitary asceticism.

=== The 40-Day Pilgrimage (The Round) ===
The Daour is a massive circular pilgrimage that begins annually at the Spring Equinox (around March 20-21). It lasts for roughly 39 to 40 days.

- The Route: The procession moves clockwise through the territory of the Chiadma, visiting 44 distinct shrines (Zaouias).
- The Tent (Lakhayma): A sacred red tent, carried on a camel, leads the procession. It represents the mobile mosque and the presence of the saints. When the tent stops, the market opens.
- **Hubs of Activity:**
  - Aquermoud: The spiritual capital where the procession is organized.
  - Had Dra: The location of a massive souq (market) where the religious procession meets economic trade. It is one of the largest traditional markets in southern Morocco.
