= Takate =

Takate تكاط ⵜⴰⴽⴰⵟ
- Rural commune
- Rural landscape in the Essaouira Province
- Interactive map of Takate
- Coordinates: 31°41′N 9°32′W
- Country: Morocco
- Region: Marrakech-Safi
- Province: Essaouira Province
- Tribal territory: Chiadma

Government
  - Type: Local council

Population (2014)
  - Total: 10,968
- Time zone: UTC+0 (WET)
  - Summer (DST): UTC+1 (WEST)
- Postal code: 44123 (Main area)

Takate (Arabic: تكاط; Tachelhit: ⵜⴰⴽⴰⵟ) is a rural commune in the Essaouira Province of the Marrakech-Safi region of Morocco. At the time of the 2014 census, the commune had a total population of 10,968 people living in 2,122 households.

== Etymology ==
The name Takate (sometimes transliterated as Takkad) is derived from the Berber (Tachelhit) word for "hearth" or "fire." In the regional context, it signifies a central point of settlement or a communal gathering place. While other locations in Morocco share the name (notably in Chtouka Aït Baha), the Takate of Essaouira is historically linked to the northern agricultural plains of the province.

== History ==
Takate is located within the historic territory of the Chiadma tribes. Unlike the Berber-speaking Haha tribes to the south, the Chiadma are an Arabized group known for their agricultural heritage and their devotion to the "Regraga" religious brotherhood.

During the French protectorate, the area was vital for grain and oil production. In the modern era, the commune has become a center for the development of sustainable Argan oil production, supported by the Moroccan government's Initiative for Human Development (INDH).

== Geography ==
The commune is situated approximately 25 kilometers inland from the Atlantic coast.

- Land Type: The terrain is dominated by semi-arid hills and calcareous plains.
- Flora: It lies within the Arganeraie Biosphere Reserve, a UNESCO-protected area. The landscape is characterized by ancient Argan trees, which are essential to the local ecosystem and economy.

== Economy and Infrastructure ==
The local economy is predominantly agricultural, centered on:

- Argan Oil: Several women's cooperatives operate in the commune, producing both culinary and cosmetic oil for export.
- Trade: There are no large-scale supermarkets; instead, commerce is conducted through traditional "Hanouts" (local grocery stores) and weekly open-air souqs.
- Transport: The commune is served by the P2216 provincial road, which connects it to the main regional hubs of Essaouira and Safi.

== Education and Services ==
Takate houses several primary educational facilities and a communal health center. Under the "Rural Roads" and "National Electricity" programs, most douars (hamlets) within the commune have been connected to the national grid and water supply over the last decade.

== Culture ==
The area is a key station in the annual Daour of the Regraga, a 40-day spring pilgrimage. This event is a major cultural and mythological festival involving thousands of pilgrims who travel through the rural communes of the Essaouira province to visit local shrines.

== See also ==
- Essaouira
- Chiadma
- Marrakech-Safi
