= Chiadma =

Moroccan tribe

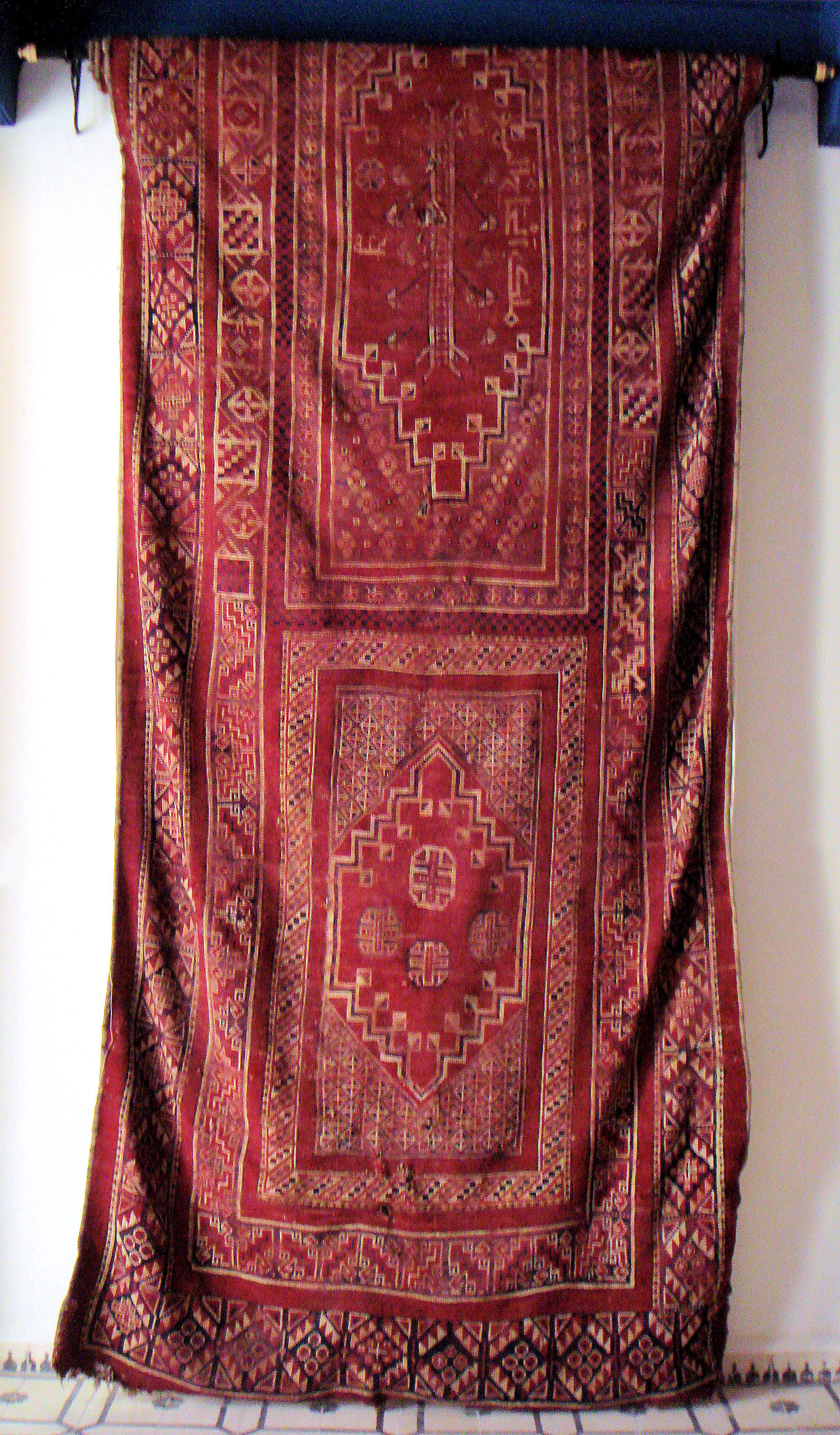
Chiadma carpet c. 18th century

The Chiadma region (Arabic: الشياظمة, romanized: al-Shyāḍma) is situated on the Atlantic coast of Morocco between Souira Guedima and Essaouira.

== Etymology ==
The name Chiadma is of Arabic origin. It comes from the word shayḏ̣am (شيظم) or shayḏ̣amī (شيظميّ) with the plural shayāḏ̣ima (شياظمة) which literally means "tall, big, corpulent, great, burly, young" and can be applied to people and animals like horses and camels. Ultimately, the name derives from the root √sh-ḏ̣-m In the colloquial dialect, it lost the diphthong /ay/ and the phoneme /ḏ̣/ [ظ] became /ḍ/ [ض] resulting in the modern name. The name of the tribe became the toponym of the region. Historically, the region was known as Regraga before the arrival of Arab tribes in the 12th century in reference to a tribe that later became incorporated into the Chiadma tribe.

== Tribal origin ==
The members of the Chiadma claim an Arab origin distinguishing themselves from the Haha who speak Shilha and who the Chiadma call shlūḥ. According to 20th century Moroccan historian Muḥammad ibn Aḥmad al-Kānūnī al-ʿAbdī, they are a mix of multiple Arab tribes like Mudar and al-Harith with Maqil among them. Some fractions of the tribe also have Berber roots like Regraga and Heskala.

The first references to the Chiadma in historical sources began in the Saadi era. Some of the authors that mention the Chiadma from this period include Leo Africanus, Luis del Mármol Carvajal and Damião de Góis.

The 16th-century Spanish chronicler Luis del Mármol Carvajal recorded the Chiadma as "beréberes Cobeyles" (Berber tribes) who lived in douars (mobile tent-villages) like Arabs. He writes :

Mármol's account of tribal tributes (Folio 46)

The tributes that the peaceful Moors paid at that time to the Captain General of Safi in the name of the King of Portugal were these:

Those of Abda, who are principal Arabs of Duquela, paid one thousand camel-loads each year, half in wheat and half in barley, counting two loads of barley as one of wheat. A camel-load is twenty fanegas of barley, or twelve of wheat; and besides this, they paid six good horses and four gyrfalcons.

Those of Garbia Icexa, who likewise are principal Arabs of that province, paid the same amount.

Those of Vled Ambran Litali, who are also powerful and rich Arabs, paid the same amount.

Those of Vled Ambran Discani, who are also of that tribe, paid the same amount.

Vled Xedma (Chiadma), who are Berber Cobeyles (tribes) who move in douars (mobile tent-villages) like Arabs, and are very powerful, paid the same amount.

Those of Vled Motaa, who are also Cobeyles and move in douars, paid the same amount.

The inhabitants of the city of Almedina of Doukkala, who are African Berbers, paid the same amount.

— Luis del Mármol Carvajal

Describing the 1510 siege of Safi, he records the tribal makeup of the league that laid siege to the city. He writes :

Mármol's account of the 1510 siege of Safi (Folio 45)

The Christians having taken possession of the city of Safi in the manner we have described, King Don Manuel appointed Nuño Fernández de Ataíde as alcayde and Captain General of it, with a sufficient number of infantry and cavalry, and many weapons, artillery, and ammunition of war. He immediately began to raid the land and made many incursions, where he captured many Moors and brought back a great number of livestock. With this, he came to be so feared in Barbary that the Cobeylas and Arabs who lived five and six leagues around the city saw fit to pay tribute to the King of Portugal and be his vassals.

In this manner they remained for some days until, being induced by the alfaquis, who told them that under no circumstances should they pay tribute to a Christian king, an enemy of their law, they made a league with the other neighboring Moors, and determined to rise up and lay siege to the city.

The principal members of this league were the Vled Ambram, Vled Iacob, and Vled Bu Azis, Arabs from the land of Azemmour, and with them the Vled Zubeit, those of Garbia, and others; and all the Cobeylas of Berbers who lived between the cities of Azemmour and Almedina, all the way to the river of Guz which falls to the west of Safi, who numbered more than five thousand cavalry and one hundred thousand infantry.

Having then gathered all these people, they arrived before the city on the thirteenth of December in the year 1510. The Cobeylas took up positions from the gate they call 'of the Gafos' to the castle, and with them part of the Arabs of the Vled Zubeyt. On the other side of the castle toward the sea, those of the Vled Ambran positioned themselves with the rest of the Vled Zubeyt and some of the Berbers of the Vled Xedma. In this manner, they surrounded the entire city from one sea to the other with many bastions and trenches that they made everywhere; and with some pieces of iron and bronze artillery, they began to shoot at the wall.

— Luis del Mármol Carvajal

Researcher Dr. Felipe B. Francisco argued that Historians from the 16th century seem to confirm the Arab origin of the Chiadma because they used to distinguish between the Haha and the Arab tribes who used to live in their territory, and the Chiadma were among them, based on these passages :

Elcherit [Al-Ḥāriṯ] dwell upon the Heli plains in the company of the Saidima [Chiadma] and collect tribute from the people of Hea [Haha]. They are vile and poor people.

— Leo Africanus

The ninth is called Vled el Querid [Al-Ḥāriṯ] and they dwell upon the Helin plains in the province of the Heha [Haha], which is located in the Kingdom of Morocco, in the company of Vled Saydima [Chiadma]. Although they were used to collect tribute from the Berber of that province, they were a vile and poorly armed people.

— Luis del Mármol Carvajal

French orientalist Édouard Michaux-Bellaire argued that the Chiadma of Doukkala (east of Azemmour) were Arabized Berbers due to their usage of words borrowed from Berber languages like sārūt < tāsārūt ‘key’; mūka <tāmūkt ‘owl’; mūš < āmshīsh ‘cat’. This argument, however, is not convincing since these are common borrowings found in all Moroccan Arabic dialects, less common words such as tāġūlālt ‘little snail’; tārānīmt ‘reed’; and tāfōtna ‘Turkish bath’ could also be explained with contact with the Chtouka. Contemporary Moroccan authors affirmed their Arab origin, the first to claim this was Al-Kānūnī (1932) followed by Ar-Regrāgī (1935).

== Territory ==
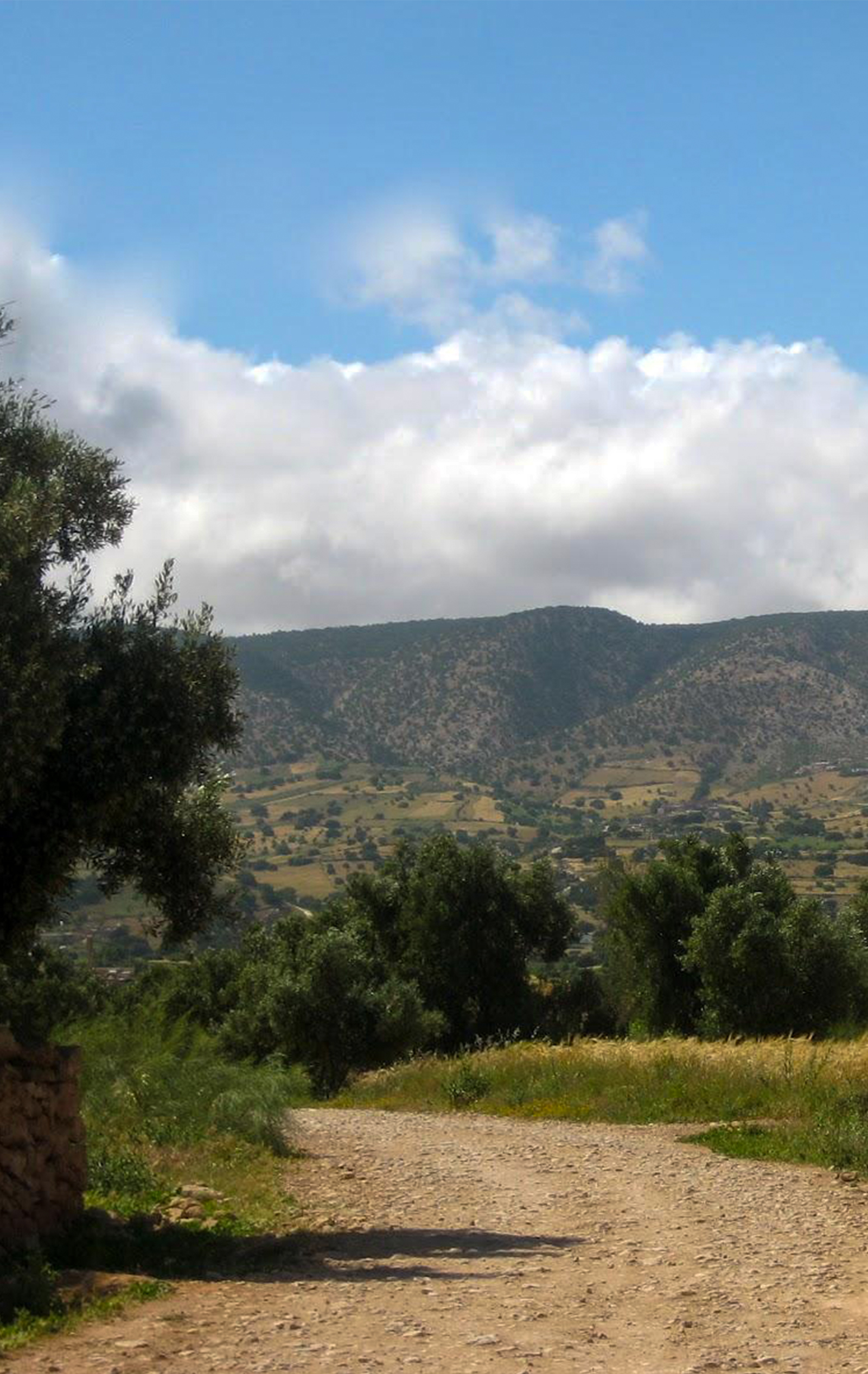
Chiadma region

The Chiadma territory is divided into two regions. The western portion lies between the sacred mountain of Regraga, Djebel Hadid, and the Atlantic Ocean coastal plain of the Sahel. This area is known for its mariners, and its farmers raise garden crops, providing the local market with vegetables, fruits and fish. Olive oil, grain and livestock are produced in the eastern Kabla region.

== Language ==
The linguist Felipe Benjamin Francisco, based on data made up of four hours of speech, concluded that the speech of the Chiadma does not show relevant contact with the Shilha language despite their centuries long relationship with the Haha. The dialect that Fransisco investigated shared many features with the Hilalian dialect spoken in the Atlantic strip, ʕṛūbi. Francisco records an excerpt of a woman originating from the Chiadma territory specifically Aquermoud.

1. kŭnna ka-nžīw l-ʕṛūbĭyya u-ḥna ṣġāṛ, māzāl ma kāyn-š ḍ-ḍu, kānu ka-ydīru š-šmăʕ, la bougie, d’accord?
2. kānu ka-ydīru f-wŭṣṭ ḍ-ḍāṛ bāš ka-yḍŭwwu u-ma kān-š hād l-ḅūḷa bḥāl hādi ma-kān-š,
3. āh, f-ǝd-dāxǝl dyāl ḍ-ḍāṛ ma-kān-š ḍ-ḍu, kān š-šmăʕ. [question]
4. lā! kŭnna ka-nxŭržu bḥāl hākka, ka-ybqāw ilăʕbu, ḥna ṣ-ṣġīwṛīn u-kān ġīṛ ḍ-ḍu dyāl
l-qāmāṛ bḥāl hākka,
5. k-ibqāw ilăʕbu, k-ibqāw ilăʕbu, dīma hna f-ǝl-līl w-āna kătt ka-nxāf, āna ma ka-nbġī-š nǝtḥăṛṛăk,
6. dīma ka-ndīr hākka u-ka-nǝbqa f-blāṣti bəzzāf w-ūma ka-yžru 29 w-ilăʕbu. [...]

1. We used to come to the countryside when we were kids, there was no light (electricity) yet, they used to put on candles, la bougie, d’accord?
2. They used to put it in the middle of the house in order to illuminate and there was no lamp like this one
there wasn’t,
3. that’s it, inside the house there was no light, there was the candle. [F.B.F.: There was no electricity?]
4. No! We used to go out like this, they kept playing, us the children, and there was the moonlight only, like this:
5. they kept playing and playing, always here in the evening. I used to be afraid, so I preferred not to move,
6. I always did this way and stayed firmly at my place and they kept running and playing […]

Alongside Darija several rural communes within the Chiadma region have notable Tachelhit-speaking populations, as of the 2024 census the numbers stood at : Meskala (42.8%), Ait Said (35.1%), Ounagha (19.2%), and Mouarid (14.5%). in 2014 the numbers were : Meskala (48.8%), Ait Said (46%), Ounagha (30.9%), and Mouarid (34.4%).

== Traditions ==
=== Regraga ===
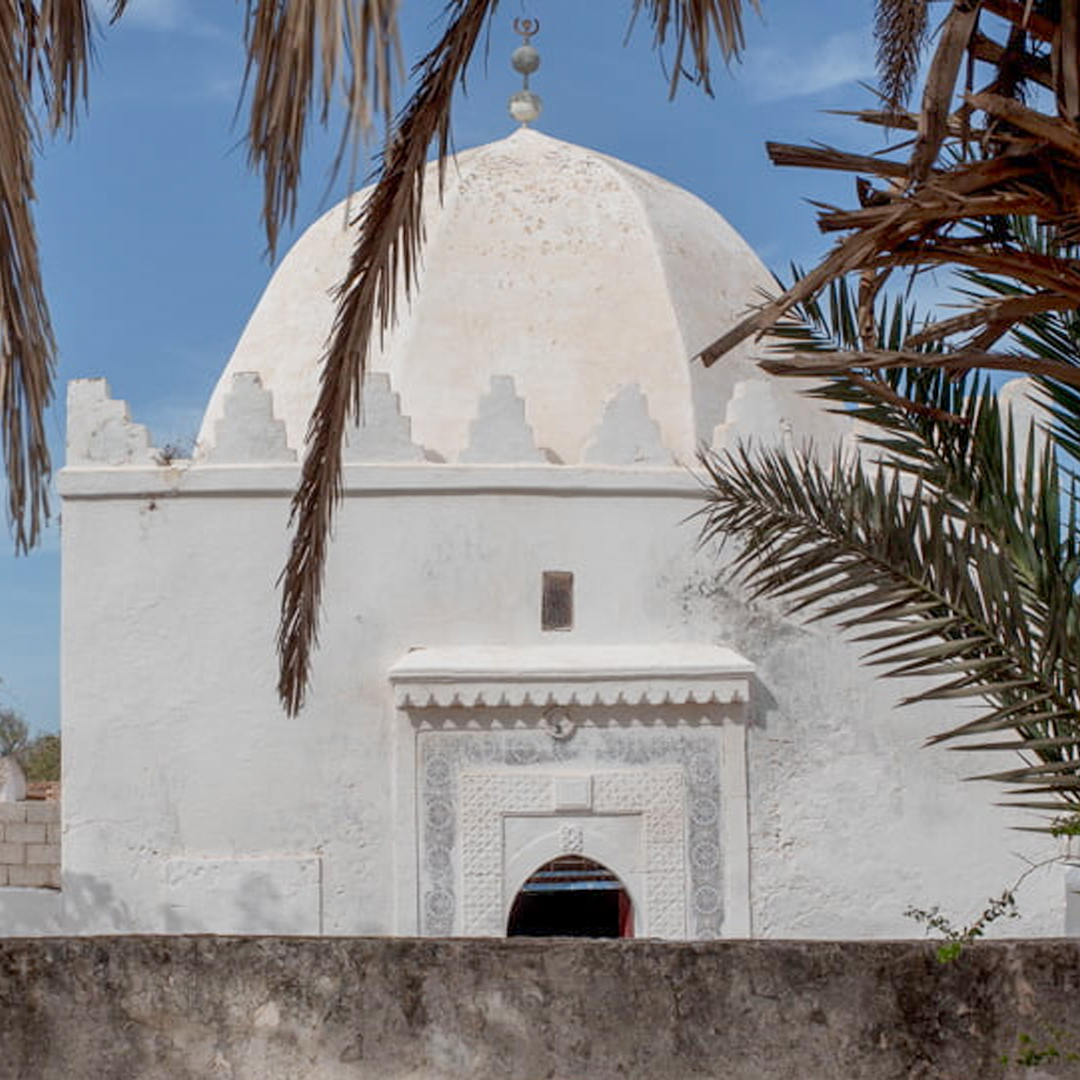
Zawiya of the Regraga

The Chiadma annually celebrate a 40-day pilgrimage, the Regraga, in spring. During these weeks, pilgrims visit a series of local shrines from the mouth of the Tensift river south of Safi to the northern outskirts of the High Atlas Mountains, and including the city of Essaouira itself. They are led by two groups on a round trip stopping at every shrine on the way. One group must dress at every shrine a holy tent made of fan palm fibres and dyed with henna, the other group arrives in a procession with a muqaddim (religious leader) riding a white horse.

=== Sidi M'Hamed Ou Marzouq ===
Every year the Sidi M'Hamed Ou Marzouq commune hosts a Moussem for the local saint Sidi Said Ouhcine, known as "Sabou' al-Eid", the festival serves an important cultural and economic role in commune, featuring Tbourida displays (with participants from Chiadma, Abda, Ahmar and Chichaoua Province) and traditional Halqa street performances, as well as markets and events for children.

=== Laâroussa ===
During droughts in the countryside around Essaouira, it is traditional to carry into the fields a white puppet decorated with white flower blossoms, called the Laâroussa Chta (لعروسة شتى ) in Arabic: Laâroussa meaning "the bride on her wedding day", and Chta meaning "rain".

== Notable people ==
- Muhammad Zarqtuni, Moroccan nationalist and resistance leader
- Miloud Chaabi, businessman & billionaire
