= Had Dra =

Had Dra أحد الدرى
- Rural commune and town
- Interactive map of Had Dra
- Coordinates: 31°34′45.7″N 9°32′16.1″W
- Country: Morocco
- Region: Marrakesh-Safi
- Province: Essaouira Province

Population (2024)
  - Total: 9,412
- Time zone: UTC+0 (WET)
  - Summer (DST): UTC+1 (WEST)
- Postal code: 44003

Had Dra (أحد الدرى; Tifinagh: ⵃⴰⴷ ⴷⵔⴰ) is a small town and rural commune in the Essaouira Province of the Marrakesh-Safi region of Morocco. Located approximately 30 kilometers northeast of Essaouira, it serves as a major commercial hub for the region's rural population, primarily through its historic weekly market.

== Geography ==
Had Dra is situated on the arid plains of the Essaouira hinterland. The landscape features rolling hills and rocky plateaus dominated by Argan forests. The name is derived from the Tamazight word adra, referring to the wild fig trees historically found in the area.

The commune acts as a vital link between the coastal regions and the interior, bordering several other rural municipalities within the Essaouira Province.

== History ==
Historically, the area was a territory of the Chiadma and Haha tribes. It has served for centuries as a "neutral" meeting point for local tribes to conduct trade. This legacy continues today through the town's massive Sunday market, which remains one of the most culturally significant gathering points in Central Morocco.

== Demographics ==
According to the **2024 General Population and Housing Census**, the population of Had Dra has grown to **9,412** residents, up from 8,984 in 2004. The number of households has increased to **2,284**, reflecting a national trend toward smaller, nuclear family structures. The population is largely Amazigh (Chiadma), and while Darija is the primary language of daily life, Tachelhit is rarely spoken in the surrounding rural douars.

== Economy ==
The local economy is driven by a mix of agriculture and traditional commerce:

- Sunday Market (Souk el Had): This is the primary economic driver. It is one of Morocco’s largest weekly markets, known specifically for its livestock trade, including camels and cattle.
- Agriculture: The region specializes in Argan oil production, olives, and cereal crops. Livestock farming (goats and sheep) remains a staple of the rural economy.
- Tourism & Viticulture: The presence of local vineyards, such as Le Domaine du Val d’Argan, has introduced a specialized agricultural tourism niche to the area.

== Local Landmarks ==
- Ain el Hajar: A nearby natural spring and oasis that supports lush vegetation in an otherwise arid environment.
- The souk Market: A unique cultural spectacle within the weekly souk where traditional livestock negotiation practices are still maintained.
