= Sidi Boulaalam =

- Rural commune and town
- Location of Sidi Boulaalam within Morocco
- Coordinates: 31°40′39″N 9°16′21″W
- Country: Morocco
- Region: Marrakesh-Safi
- Province: Essaouira
- Elevation: 453 m (1,486 ft)

Population (2014)
  - Total: 8,142
- Time zone: UTC+0 (GMT)

Sidi Boulaalam (Arabic: سيدي بولعلام) is a small town and rural commune in Essaouira Province, Marrakesh-Safi, Morocco. It is about 145 kilometres (90 mi) southwest of Casablanca, north of Route 207 (the Essaouira-Marrakesh road), along Route 2202 between Sidi Aissa Regragui to the northwest and Route 2200 to Tafetachte.

At the time of the 2014 census, the commune had a total population of 8,142 people living in 1,561 households. This was up from the 2004 census of 7,880 people in 1,310 households.

The climate in Sidi Boulaalam is semi-arid, with cooler winters than the coast, freezing occurring in the winter, but it is warmer than the coast in summer. The Köppen-Geiger climate classification is BSk. The average total annual rainfall is only 327 millimetres (12.9 in), with most of it occurring in the winter, and almost no precipitation in July and August.

Fifteen people were killed and many more injured there during a crowd crush for food in November 2017.
