= Sidi H'Mad Ou M'Barek =

- Rural commune and town
- Interactive map of Sidi H'Mad Ou M'Barek
- Country: Morocco
- Region: Marrakech-Tensift-Al Haouz
- Province: Essaouira Province

Population (2004)
  - Total: 6,183
- Time zone: UTC+0 (GMT)

Sidi H'Mad Ou M'Barek is a small town and rural commune in Essaouira Province of the Marrakech-Tensift-Al Haouz region of Morocco. At the time of the 2004 census, the commune had a population of 6183 people living in 1146 households.
