= Tahelouante =

- Rural commune and town
- Interactive map of Tahelouante
- Coordinates: 31°12′05″N 9°18′19″W
- Country: Morocco
- Region: Marrakech-Tensift-Al Haouz
- Province: Essaouira Province

Population (2004)
  - Total: 4,552
- Time zone: UTC+0 (GMT)

Tahelouante is a small town and rural commune in Essaouira Province of the Marrakech-Tensift-Al Haouz region of Morocco. At the time of the 2004 census, the commune had a total population of 4552 people living in 778 households.
