= Sidi Laaroussi =

Sidi Laaroussi سيدي لعروسي
- Rural commune and town
- Location within Morocco
- Country: Morocco
- Region: Marrakech-Tensift-Al Haouz
- Province: Essaouira Province
- Elevation: 157 m (515 ft)

Population (2004)
  - Total: 13,202
- Time zone: UTC+0 (GMT)

Sidi Laaroussi is a small town and rural commune in Essaouira Province of the Marrakech-Tensift-Al Haouz region of Morocco. At the time of the 2004 census, the commune had a total population of 13,202 people living in 2078 households.

The average annual temperature is about 74 °F, with the hottest month being August, versus the coldest month, January. Annually, it rains about 14 inches, most of it occurring during November, and the least of it from June.
