= Essaouira Province =

Essaouira Province إقليم الصويرة ⵜⴰⵙⴳⴰ ⵏ ⵜⵚⵚⵓⵔⵜ
- Province
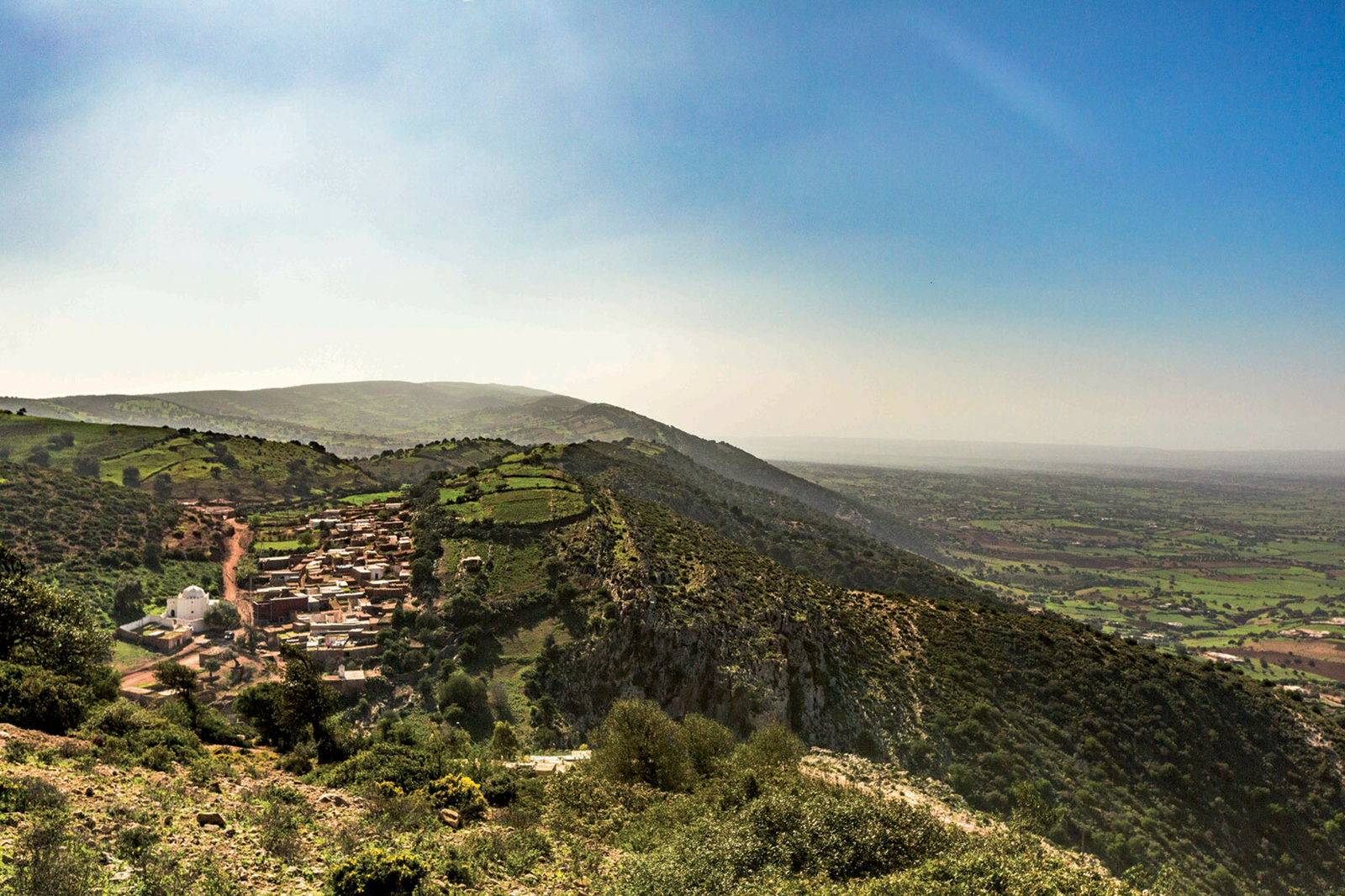

- Flag
- Interactive map of Essaouira Province
- Coordinates: 31°31′N 9°46′W
- Country: Morocco
- Region: Marrakesh-Safi
- Capital: Essaouira

Population (2024)
  - Total: 425,449
- Time zone: UTC+0 (GMT)

Essaouira (Arabic: الصويرة, Standard Moroccan Tamazight: ⵜⴰⵚⵚⵓⵔⵜ) is a province in the Moroccan region of Marrakesh-Safi. Its population in 2024 was 425,449.

The seat and namesake of the province is the city of Essaouira, the province is inhabited by the Haha tribes south of the city and Chiadma tribes north of it.

The province is one of the main habitats for the Argan tree.

== Subdivisions ==
Communes of Essaouira Province

The province is divided administratively into the following:

=== Municipalities ===
Name	Geographic code	Households (2024)	Population (2024)
Ait Daoud	211.01.01.	974	3653
El Hanchane	211.01.03.	1360	5319
Essaouira	211.01.05.	24719	82962
Talmest	211.01.07.	1322	4638
Tamanar	211.01.09.	2934	11617

=== Rural communes ===
Name	Geographic code	Households (2024)	Population (2024)	Notes
Adaghas	211.07.01.	432	1656	
Aglif	211.07.03.	1712	6499	
Aguerd	211.05.05.	1453	5370	
Ait Aissi Ihahane	211.05.07.	768	2563	
Ait Said	211.09.01.	1557	6027	
Aquermoud	211.03.03.	3994	15981	
Assais	211.07.09.	1207	4442	
Bizdad	211.07.11.	1742	7077	
Bouzemmour	211.07.13.	1015	3940	
Ezzaouite	211.07.15.	1470	5818	
Had Dra	211.03.05.	2432	9435	
Ida Ou Aazza	211.05.17.	1792	7635	
Ida Ou Guelloul	211.05.19.	1311	5086	
Ida Ou Kazzou	211.05.21.	951	3511	
Imgrade	211.05.23.	1243	4817	
Imi N'Tlit	211.05.25.	1666	7179	
Kechoula	211.09.07.	1389	5934	
Korimate	211.09.09.	2316	9526	
Lagdadra	211.09.11.	1701	6699	
Lahsinate	211.09.13.	1262	4932	
Mejji	211.09.15.	1497	6479	
Meskala	211.09.17.	1065	4378	
M'Khalif	211.03.25.	1301	5062	
Mouarid	211.09.19.	1263	5320	
Moulay Bouzarqtoune	211.03.21.	1422	5608	
M'Ramer	211.09.27.	1557	6488	
Mzilate	211.09.23.	853	3573	
Oulad M'Rabet	211.09.29.	936	3951	
Ounagha	211.03.31.	3618	13310	Urban centre: Ounagha (1,699 inhabitants; 496 households)
Sidi Abdeljalil	211.03.33.	1685	6056	
Sidi Ahmed Essayeh	211.05.27.	1330	5233	
Sidi Aissa Regragui	211.09.35.	1800	7567	
Sidi Ali El Korati	211.03.37.	1557	6099	
Sidi Boulaalam	211.09.39.	1801	7681	
Sidi El Jazouli	211.05.29.	1447	5554	
Sidi Ghaneme	211.07.31.	943	4161	
Sidi Hmad Ou Hamed	211.05.35.	985	3548	
Sidi H'Mad Ou M'Barek	211.05.33.	1294	4726	
Sidi Ishaq	211.03.41.	2434	10055	
Sidi Kaouki	211.05.37.	1482	4877	
Sidi Laaroussi	211.03.43.	2512	10604	
Sidi M'Hamed Ou Marzouq	211.09.45.	963	4306	
Smimou	211.05.39.	2229	8883	Urban centre: Smimou (4,033 inhabitants; 991 households)
Tafedna	211.05.41.	1265	4999	
Tafetachte	211.09.47.	1850	7342	Urban centre: Tafetachte (1,546 inhabitants; 443 households)
Tahelouante	211.07.43.	757	2910	
Takate	211.03.49.	2545	9993	
Takoucht	211.07.45.	919	3209	
Targante	211.05.47.	1542	6392	
Tidzi	211.05.49.	984	3770	
Timizguida Ouftas	211.05.51.	1233	4952	
Zaouiat Ben Hmida	211.03.51.	1811	7317	
