= Takoucht =

- Rural commune and town
- Location within Morocco
- Coordinates: 31.1875°N 9.450556°W
- Country: Morocco
- Region: Marrakech-Tensift-Al Haouz
- Province: Essaouira Province

Population (2004)
  - Total: 5,135
- Time zone: UTC+0 (GMT)

Takoucht is a small town and rural commune in Essaouira Province of the Marrakech-Tensift-Al Haouz region of Morocco. At the time of the 2004 census, the commune had a total population of 5,135 people living in 924 households.
