= Sidi Hmad Ou Hamed =

- Rural commune and town
- Interactive map of Sidi Hmad Ou Hamed
- Country: Morocco
- Region: Marrakech-Tensift-Al Haouz
- Province: Essaouira Province

Population (2004)
  - Total: 4,301
- Time zone: UTC+0 (GMT)

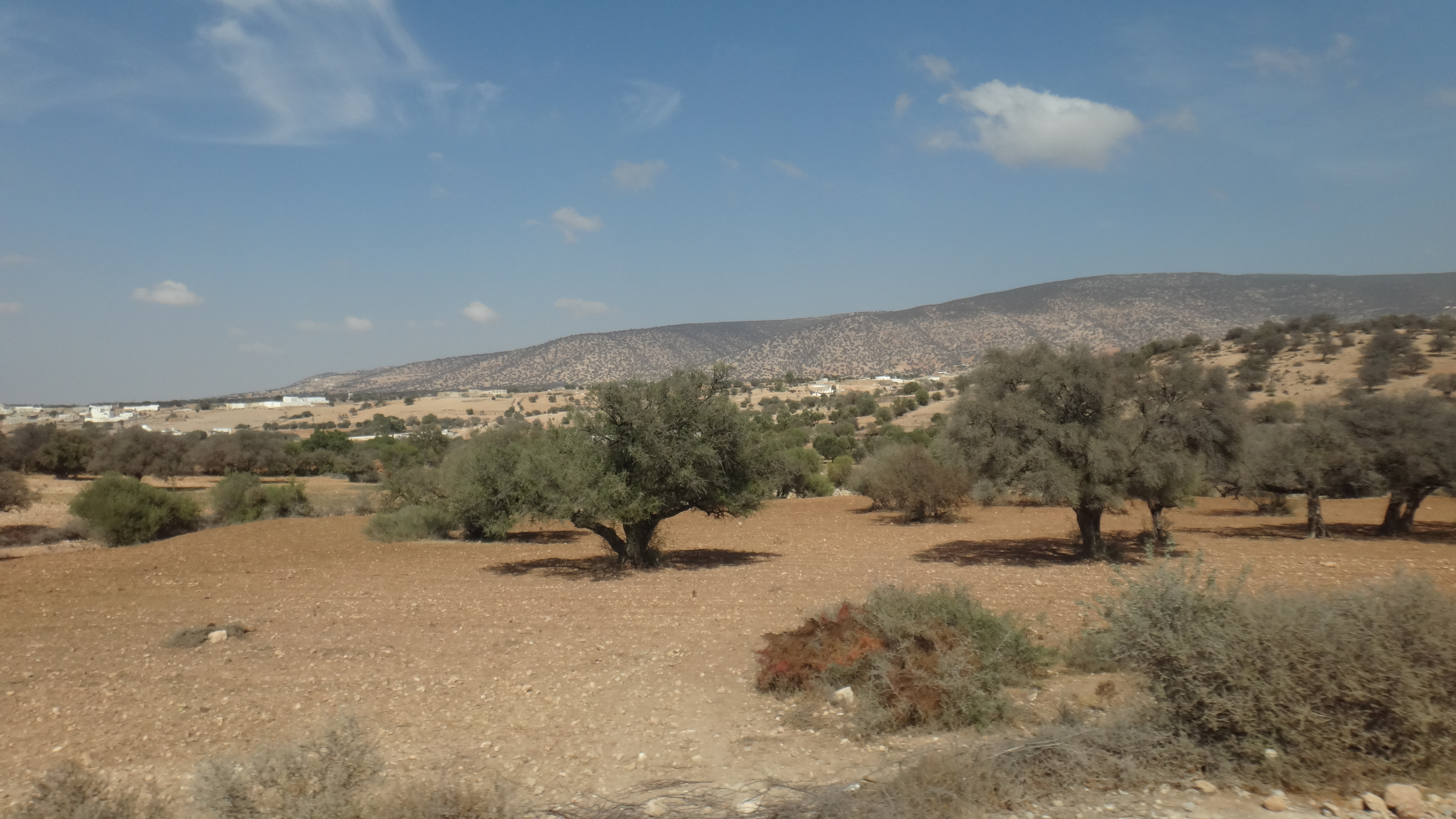

Sidi Hmad Ou Hamed is a small town and rural commune in Essaouira Province of the Marrakech-Tensift-Al Haouz region of Morocco. At the time of the 2004 census, the commune had a total population of 4301 people living in 854 households.
