= Timizguida Ouftas =

Timizguida Ouftas ⵜⵉⵎⵣⴳⵉⴷⴰ ⵓⴼⵜⴰⵙ تمزكدة-أوفتاس
- Rural commune and town
- Location within Morocco
- Coordinates: 30.991°N 9.799°W
- Country: Morocco
- Region: Marrakech-Tensift-Al Haouz
- Province: Essaouira Province

Population (2004)
  - Total: 5,218
- Time zone: UTC+0 (GMT)

Timizguida Ouftas is a small town and rural commune in Essaouira Province of the Marrakech-Tensift-Al Haouz region of Morocco. At the time of the 2004 census, the commune had a total population of 5218 people living in 887 households.
