= Sidi Abdeljalil =

- Rural commune and town
- Location within Morocco
- Coordinates: 31.832778°N 9.3325°W
- Country: Morocco
- Region: Marrakech-Tensift-Al Haouz
- Province: Essaouira Province

Population (2004)
  - Total: 6,963
- Time zone: UTC+0 (GMT)

Sidi Abdeljalil is a small town and rural commune in Essaouira Province of the Marrakech-Tensift-Al Haouz region of Morocco. At the time of the 2004 census, the commune had a total population of 6,963 people living in 1,293 households.
