= Mrabet =

Mrabet or M'rabet (Arabic: المرابط) is a North-African surname. Notable people with the surname include:

- Driss El Mrabet (born 1967), Moroccan football manager and former player
- Fadéla M'rabet (1935–2025), Algerian writer, teacher and feminist
- Haitham Mrabet (born 1980), Tunisian football midfielder
- Marouane M'rabet (born 1985), Tunisian volleyball player
- Mohamed Mrabet (born 1936), Moroccan author
- Mohamed Mrabet (canoeist) (born 1990), Tunisian sprint canoeist
- Oussama Mrabet (born 1993), French football player of Tunisian descent
- Taki Mrabet (born 1989), Tunisian swimmer
- Yasmin Mrabet (born 1999), Spanish-born Moroccan footballer

== See also ==
- Oulad M'Rabet, a town in Morocco
