= Ezzaouite =

- Rural commune and town
- Location within Morocco
- Coordinates: 31.339167°N 9.437222°W
- Country: Morocco
- Region: Marrakech-Tensift-Al Haouz
- Province: Essaouira Province

Population (2004)
  - Total: 6,557
- Time zone: UTC+0 (GMT)

Ezzaouite is a small town and rural commune in Essaouira Province of the Marrakech-Tensift-Al Haouz region of Morocco. At the time of the 2004 census, the commune had a total population of 6,557 people living in 1,081 households.
