= Sidi Ghaneme =

Sidi Ghaneme سيدي غانم
- Rural commune and town
- Interactive map of Sidi Ghaneme
- Coordinates: 31°17′12″N 9°26′49″W
- Country: Morocco
- Region: Marrakech-Tensift-Al Haouz
- Province: Essaouira Province

Population (2004)
  - Total: 5,102
- Time zone: UTC+0 (GMT)

Sidi Ghaneme is a small town and rural commune in Essaouira Province of the Marrakech-Tensift-Al Haouz region of Morocco. At the time of the 2004 census, the commune had a total population of 5102 people living in 872 households.
