= Mejji =

Coordinates: 31°33′N 9°21′W

- Rural commune and town
- Interactive map of Mejji
- Country: Morocco
- Region: Marrakech-Tensift-Al Haouz
- Province: Essaouira Province

Population (2004)
  - Total: 7,029
- Time zone: UTC+0 (GMT)

Mejji is a small town and rural commune in Essaouira Province of the Marrakech-Tensift-Al Haouz region of Morocco. At the 2004 census, the commune's total population was 7,029 people living in 1,229 households.
