= Bouzemmour =

- Rural commune and town
- Location within Morocco
- Coordinates: 31.006111°N 9.404167°W
- Country: Morocco
- Region: Marrakech-Tensift-Al Haouz
- Province: Essaouira Province

Population (2004)
  - Total: 6,627
- Time zone: UTC+0 (GMT)

Bouzemmour is a small town and rural commune in Essaouira Province of the Marrakech-Tensift-Al Haouz region of Morocco. At the time of the 2004 census, the commune had a total population of 6,627 people living in 1,185 households.
