= Targante =

- Rural commune and town
- Location within Morocco
- Coordinates: 30°49′N 9°04′W
- Country: Morocco
- Region: Marrakech-Tensift-Al Haouz
- Province: Essaouira Province

Population (2004)
  - Total: 7,870
- Time zone: UTC+0 (GMT)

Targante is a small town and rural commune in Essaouira Province of the Marrakech-Tensift-Al Haouz region of Morocco. At the time of the 2004 census, the commune had a total population of 7,870 people living in 1,340 households.
