= Ait Aissi Ihahane =

- Rural commune and town
- Location within Morocco Location within Africa
- Coordinates: 30°54′53″N 9°15′40″W
- Country: Morocco
- Region: Marrakech-Tensift-Al Haouz
- Province: Essaouira Province

Population (2004)
  - Total: 5,437
- Time zone: UTC+0 (GMT)

Ait Aissi Ihahane is a small town and rural commune in Essaouira Province of the Marrakech-Tensift-Al Haouz region of Morocco. At the time of the 2004 census, the commune had a total population of 5437 people living in 928 households.
