= Lahsinate =

- Rural commune and town
- Interactive map of Lahsinate
- Country: Morocco
- Region: Marrakech-Tensift-Al Haouz
- Province: Essaouira Province

Population (2004)
  - Total: 5,324
- Time zone: UTC+0 (GMT)

Lahsinate is a small town and rural commune in Essaouira Province of the Marrakech-Tensift-Al Haouz region of Morocco. At the time of the 2004 census, the commune had a total population of 5324 people living in 1025 households.
