= Sidi Ali El Korati =

Sidi Ali El Korati سيدي علي الكراتي
- Rural commune and town
- Interactive map of Sidi Ali El Korati
- Country: Morocco
- Region: Marrakech-Tensift-Al Haouz
- Province: Essaouira Province

Population (2004)
  - Total: 6,623
- Time zone: UTC+0 (GMT)

Sidi Ali El Korati is a small town and rural commune in Essaouira Province of the Marrakech-Tensift-Al Haouz region of Morocco. At the time of the 2004 census, the commune had a total population of 6623 people living in 1320 households.
