= Sidi Ahmed Essayeh =

Sidi Ahmed Essayeh سيدي أحمد السايح
- Rural commune and town
- Interactive map of Sidi Ahmed Essayeh
- Country: Morocco
- Region: Marrakech-Tensift-Al Haouz
- Province: Essaouira Province

Population (2004)
  - Total: 6,044
- Time zone: UTC+0 (GMT)

Sidi Ahmed Essayeh is a small town and rural commune in Essaouira Province of the Marrakech-Tensift-Al Haouz region of Morocco. At the time of the 2004 census, the commune had a total population of 6044 people living in 1110 households.
