= Tafedna =

- Rural commune and town
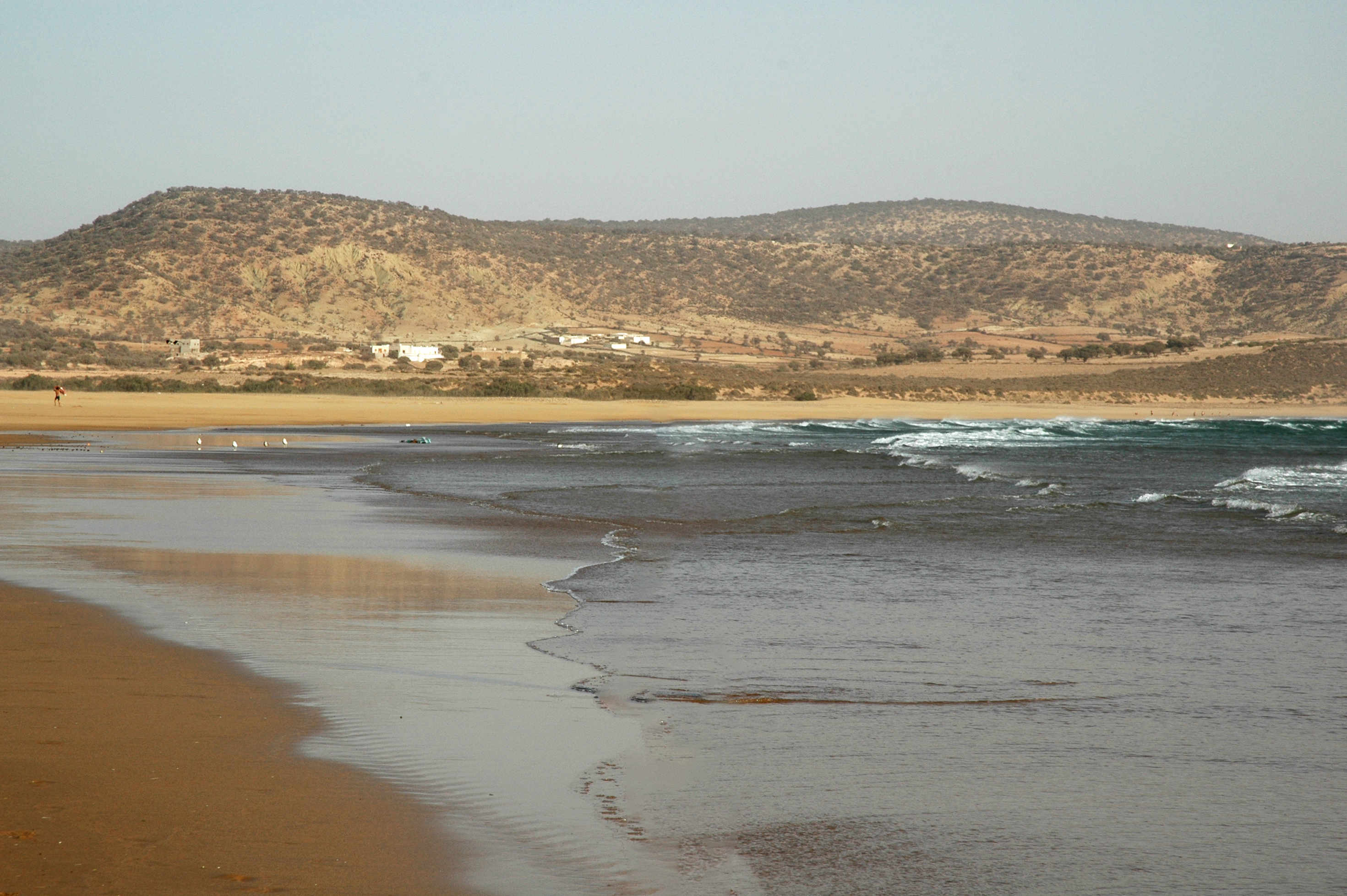
- Tafedna beach, Morocco (2008)

- Location within Morocco
- Coordinates: 31.095833°N 9.820833°W
- Country: Morocco
- Region: Marrakech-Tensift-Al Haouz
- Province: Essaouira Province

Population (2004)
  - Total: 5,234
- Time zone: UTC+0 (GMT)

Tafedna is a small town and rural commune in Essaouira Province of the Marrakech-Tensift-Al Haouz region of Morocco. At the time of the 2004 census, the commune had a total population of 5,234 people living in 889 households.
