= Sidi El Jazouli =

Sidi El Jazouli سيدي الجزولي
- Rural commune and town
- Location within Morocco
- Coordinates: 31.295833°N 9.5625°W
- Country: Morocco
- Region: Marrakech-Tensift-Al Haouz
- Province: Essaouira Province

Population (2004)
  - Total: 7,360
- Time zone: UTC+0 (GMT)

Sidi El Jazouli is a small town and rural commune in Essaouira Province of the Marrakech-Tensift-Al Haouz region of Morocco. At the time of the 2004 census, the commune had a total population of 7,360 people living in 1,304 households.
