= M'Khalif =

- Rural commune and town
- Interactive map of M'Khalif
- Coordinates: 31°53′04″N 9°15′39″W
- Country: Morocco
- Region: Marrakech-Tensift-Al Haouz
- Province: Essaouira Province

Population (2004)
  - Total: 5,463
- Time zone: UTC+0 (GMT)

M'Khalif is a small town and rural commune in Essaouira Province of the Marrakech-Tensift-Al Haouz region of Morocco. At the time of the 2004 census, the commune had a total population of 5463 people living in 919 households.
