= Zaouiat Ben Hmida =

Zaouiat Ben Hmida زاوية بن احميدة
- Rural commune and town
- Location within Morocco
- Country: Morocco
- Region: Marrakech-Tensift-Al Haouz
- Province: Essaouira Province

Population (2004)
  - Total: 6,432
- Time zone: UTC+0 (GMT)

Zaouiat Ben Hmida is a small town and rural commune in Essaouira Province of the Marrakech-Tensift-Al Haouz region of Morocco. At the time of the 2004 census, the commune had a total population of 6432 people living in 1161 households.
