= Talmest =

Town and commune in Essaouira Province, Morocco

Talmest تالمست ⵜⴰⵍⵎⵙⵜ
- Town and rural commune
- Interactive map of Talmest
- Country: Morocco
- Region: Marrakesh-Safi
- Province: Essaouira Province

Population (2014)
  - Total: 4,328
- Time zone: UTC+0 (GMT)

Talmest (تالمست, ⵜⴰⵍⵎⵙⵜ) is a small town and rural commune in Essaouira Province of the Marrakesh-Safi region of Morocco. According to the 2014 census, the commune had a total population of 4,328 people.

== Geography ==
Talmest is situated in the western part of Morocco, located approximately 60 kilometers northeast of the coastal city of Essaouira. It lies along the N1 national road, which connects the region to Safi to the north. The terrain is characterized by the arid and semi-arid landscapes typical of the transition between the Atlantic coast and the interior plains of the Marrakesh-Safi region.

== History ==
The administrative status of Talmest was defined following the regional reorganization of Morocco. Historically, the area has served as a local center for trade and transit for the surrounding agricultural hinterland. Following the 2015 regional reform, it became part of the Marrakesh-Safi region, having previously been part of the Marrakesh-Tensift-El Haouz region.

== Demographics ==
At the time of the 2004 census, the commune had a population of 4,133 people living in 880 households. By the 2014 census, this figure had increased to 4,328.

The population is primarily of Amazigh and Arab descent. The most widely spoken languages in the commune are Moroccan Arabic (Darija).

== Economy ==
The economy of Talmest is largely based on agriculture and commerce. The surrounding rural areas focus on the cultivation of hardy crops and the production of Argan oil, which is a primary export of the Essaouira Province. The town serves as a "souk" or market center for nearby villages, providing a hub for the exchange of livestock and agricultural goods.

== Infrastructure ==
=== Transportation ===
The town is bisected by the N1 highway, a major north-south arterial route in Morocco. This provides Talmest with direct road links to Safi, Essaouira, and Agadir.

=== Education and Health ===
Talmest contains basic educational facilities, including primary and secondary schools serving the local population and surrounding rural districts. Primary healthcare services are provided through a local health center (Centre de Santé).

== Administration ==
Talmest is the administrative center of the Rural Commune of Talmest. It falls under the jurisdiction of the Caïdat of Talmest, within the Cercle of Talmest, in the Province of Essaouira. Local governance is managed by a communal council responsible for public services and local infrastructure development.
