= M'Ramer =

- Rural commune and town
- Interactive map of M'Ramer
- Coordinates: 31°39′35″N 9°09′49″W
- Country: Morocco
- Region: Marrakech-Tensift-Al Haouz
- Province: Essaouira Province

Population (2004)
  - Total: 7,782
- Time zone: UTC+0 (GMT)

M'Ramer is a small town and rural commune in Essaouira Province of the Marrakech-Tensift-Al Haouz region of Morocco. At the time of the 2004 census, the commune had a total population of 7782 people living in 1281 households.
