= Assais =

- Rural commune and town
- Location within Morocco
- Coordinates: 30.913056°N 9.243889°W
- Country: Morocco
- Region: Marrakesh-Tensift-El Haouz
- Province: Essaouira Province

Population (2004)
  - Total: 7,603
- Time zone: UTC+0 (GMT)

Assais is a small town and rural commune in Essaouira Province of the Marrakesh-Tensift-El Haouz region of Morocco. At the time of the 2004 census, the commune had a total population of 7,603 people living in 1,321 households.
