= Imi N'Tlit =

- Rural commune and town
- Location within Morocco
- Coordinates: 31.23485°N 9.5885°W
- Country: Morocco
- Region: Marrakech-Tensift-Al Haouz
- Province: Essaouira Province

Population (2004)
  - Total: 8,215
- Time zone: UTC+0 (GMT)

Imi N'Tlit is a small town and rural commune in Essaouira Province of the Marrakech-Tensift-Al Haouz region of Morocco. At the time of the 2004 census, the commune had a total population of 8,215 people living in 1,406 households.
