= Ida Ou Guelloul =

- Rural commune and town
- Location within Morocco
- Coordinates: 30.9525°N 9.699167°W
- Country: Morocco
- Region: Marrakech-Tensift-Al Haouz
- Province: Essaouira Province

Population (2004)
  - Total: 6,650
- Time zone: UTC+0 (GMT)

Ida Ou Guelloul is a small town and rural commune in Essaouira Province of the Marrakech-Tensift-Al Haouz region of Morocco. In 2004, the commune had a total population of 6,650 people living in 1,053 households.
