= Korimate =

- Rural commune and town
- Location within Morocco
- Coordinates: 31°27′N 9°19′W
- Country: Morocco
- Region: Marrakech-Tensift-Al Haouz
- Province: Essaouira Province

Population (2004)
  - Total: 10,842
- Time zone: UTC+0 (GMT)

Korimate is a small town and rural commune in Essaouira Province of the Marrakech-Tensift-Al Haouz region of Morocco. At the time of the 2004 census, the commune had a total population of 10,842 people living in 1,912 households.
