= Sidi Ishaq =

- Rural commune and town
- Interactive map of Sidi Ishaq
- Country: Morocco
- Region: Marrakech-Tensift-Al Haouz
- Province: Essaouira Province

Population (2004)
  - Total: 9,553
- Time zone: UTC+0 (GMT)

Sidi Ishaq is a small town and rural commune in Essaouira Province of the Marrakech-Tensift-Al Haouz region of Morocco. At the time of the 2004 census, the commune had a total population of 9553 people living in 1588 households.
