= Sidi Kaouki =

- Rural commune and town
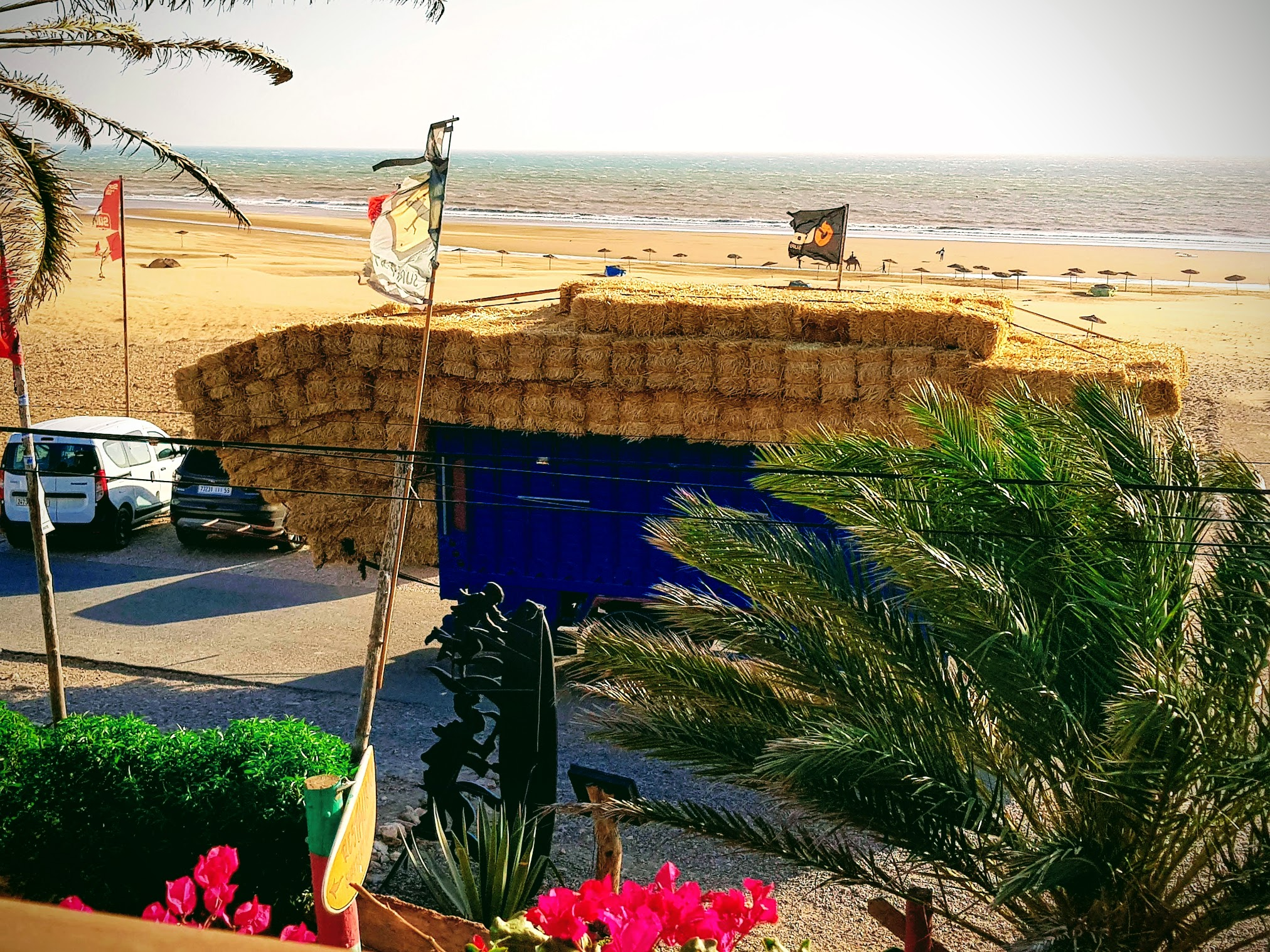
- Transport of straw on a road along the beach

- Location within Morocco
- Coordinates: 31°21′20″N 9°47′50″W
- Country: Morocco
- Region: Marrakesh-Safi
- Province: Essaouira Province

Population (2004)
  - Total: 4,335
- Time zone: UTC+0 (GMT)

Sidi Kaouki is a small town located 25 km south of Essaouira. It is a rural commune in Essaouira Province of the Marrakech-Safi region of Morocco. At the time of the 2004 census, the commune had a total population of 4335 people living in 902 households.

Sidi Kaouki is becoming a popular destination for wind-surfing in Morocco. There a number of surf sports including beach breaks and reef breaks that produce punchy peaks and favourable waves. It is also a suitable spot for kite surfing as the wind is stronger than some other nearby spots including Essaouira.

== Surfing ==
Sidi Kaouki is an exposed beach break which has quite reliable surf and work anytime of the year. The wintertime sees the swell pick up, and this is the peak season for surfing around Sidi Kaouki.

The beaches tends to receive a mix of ground and wind swells, with offshore winds blowing from the east/south-east. The ideal swell direction is from the north-east and the beach breaks offer both lefts and rights.

There are several surfing spots in the area, including Sidi Kaouki Plage, Maribou, La Grotte, La Couronne, Secret Spot, L’Qued, Imsouane, and Taghinsa.

== Kite surfing ==
Sidi Kaouki is a spot well known within the growing kitesurfing community. The location is blessed with strong and stable winds and the large open sandy beach makes for a great spot to launch and land. Sidi Kaouki is great for freestyle, but the clean and long rolling waves make this a great place especially for the ambitious wavekiters.

Some of the most popular kitesurfing spots around Sidi Kaouki and along this coast are La Grotte, Moulay, Imsouane, Essaouira Bay, and the "2nd Beach" at Ord Omar.

== Other watersports ==
This has been a location for windsurfing for many years due to the consistent, strong winds combined with medium-sized swell at the main beach (Sidi Kaouki Plage).

Stand Up Paddleboarding has also become a common sport in Sidi Kaouki when then wind is low. There is often a good possibility for SUP rides to catch waves.

== Nearby ==
=== Cap Sim ===
The nearest village, this is the place to pass through on the way to La Grotte and La Couronne surf spots, and there is a carpark for surfers to leave their cars. There are also cafes and restaurants.

=== Waterfalls ===
A common day trip from Sidi Kaouki is to visit the waterfalls south of Sidi Kaouki. Approximately 3 hours walk on foot it is possible to hire camels, horses, and local guides to show you this spot.

=== Berber Villages ===
Sidi Kaouki is surrounded by many small Berber villages, some connected by unsealed roads and others along the paved coastal road to the south.
