= Ait Daoud =

- Town
- Location in Morocco
- Coordinates: 31.0805°N 9.3513°W
- Country: Morocco
- Region: Marrakesh-Safi
- Province: Essaouira
- Elevation: 351 m (1,152 ft)

Population (2004)
  - Total: 2,497
- Time zone: UTC+0 (GMT)

Ait Daoud is a town in Essaouira Province, Marrakesh-Safi, Morocco. According to the 2004 census it has a population of 2,497.
