= Adaghas =

- Rural commune and town
- Location within Morocco
- Coordinates: 31°14′N 9°03′W
- Country: Morocco
- Region: Marrakesh-Safi
- Province: Essaouira

Population (2004)
  - Total: 3,321
- Time zone: UTC+0 (GMT)

Adaghas is a small town and rural commune in Essaouira Province of the Marrakesh-Safi region of Morocco. At the time of the 2024 census, the commune had a total population of 1,656 people living in 434 households.
