= El Hanchane =

El Hanchane Tednest
- Town
- Interactive map of El Hanchane
- Coordinates: 31.5292°N 9.4359°W
- Country: Morocco
- Region: Marrakesh-Safi
- Province: Essaouira
- Elevation: 389 m (1,276 ft)

Population (2004)
  - Total: 4,698
- Time zone: UTC+0 (GMT)

El Hanchane is a town in Essaouira Province, Marrakesh-Safi, Morocco. According to the 2004 census it had a population of 4,698.

The area was historically known as Tednest.
