= International Day of Argania =

Annual observance

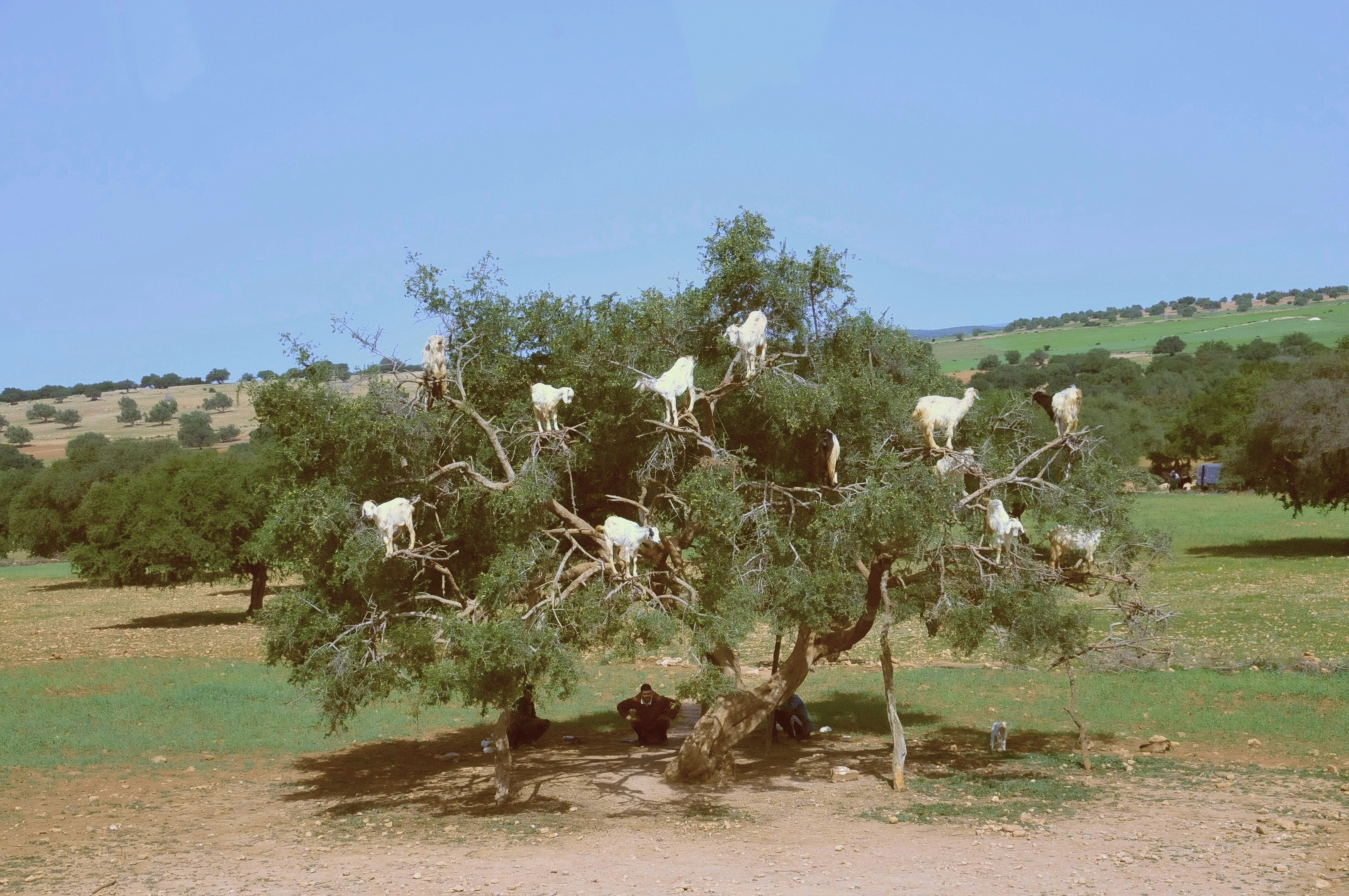
Goats on an argan tree in the Marrakech region

International Day of Argania holds on every May 10 celebrate and promote the heritage of the Argania tree.

== Background ==
The Argania tree holds is significant in Moroccan culture and heritage. Morocco is the main international exporter of Argan-based products which is used to produce popular ingredient in cosmetics, skincare, and hair care products.

In 1988, the United Nations Educational Scientific and Cultural Organization designated the production area for the Arganeraie Biosphere Reserve. The argan tree was a subject of the UNESCO Representative List of the Intangible Cultural Heritage of Humanity in 2014.

On March 3, 2021, the United Nations General Assembly declared May 10 the International Day of Argania. The resolution was adoped by 113 United Nations member states by consensus.
