= Sidi Aissa Regragui =

Sidi Aissa Regragui سيدي عيسى الركراكي
- Rural commune and town
- Interactive map of Sidi Aissa Regragui
- Country: Morocco
- Region: Marrakech-Tensift-Al Haouz
- Province: Essaouira Province

Population (2004)
  - Total: 7,635
- Time zone: UTC+0 (GMT)

Sidi Aissa Regragui is a small town and rural commune in Essaouira Province of the Marrakech-Tensift-Al Haouz region of Morocco. At the time of the 2004 census, the commune had a total population of 7,635 people living in 1,303 households.
