= Aguerd =

- Rural commune and town
- Location within Morocco
- Coordinates: 31°25′29″N 9°38′09″W
- Country: Morocco
- Region: Marrakesh-Safi
- Province: Essaouira

Population (2004)
  - Total: 4,917
- Time zone: UTC+0 (GMT)

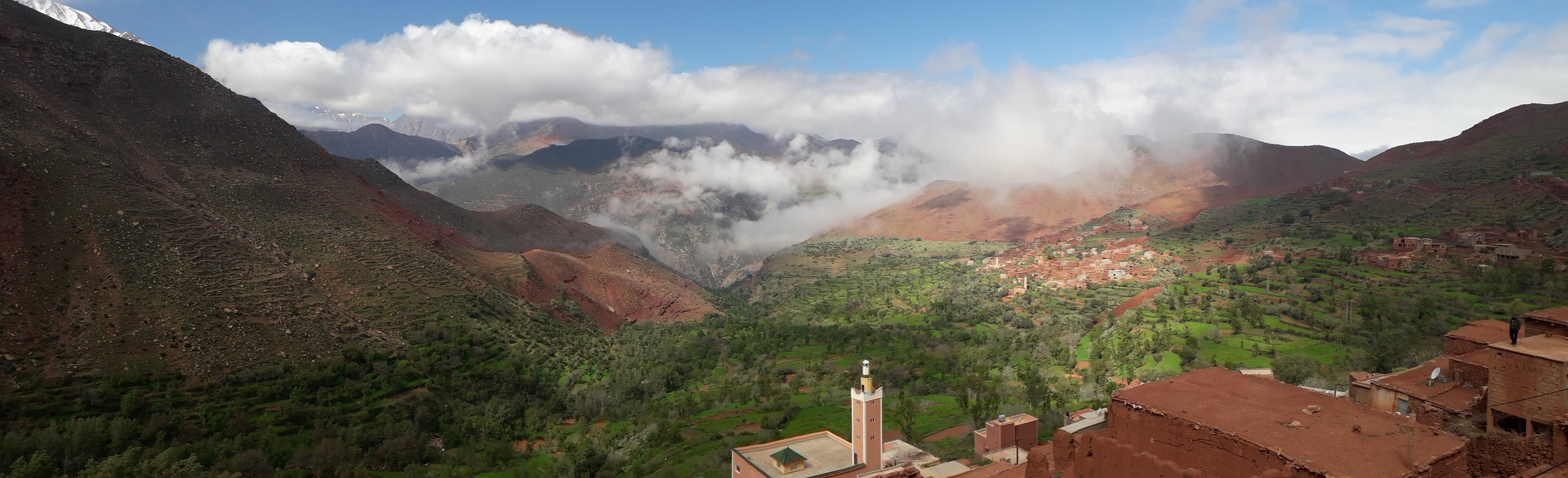
View of the surrounding landscape

Aguerd is a small town and rural commune in Essaouira Province of the Marrakesh-Safi region of Morocco. At the time of the 2004 census, the commune had a total population of 4,917 people living in 990 households.

Temperatures range from around 20 °C to 47 °C, however will often halve or more during the night; rain is extremely rare, however occasionally occurs throughout October to February.
