= Aglif =

- Rural commune and town
- Location within Morocco
- Coordinates: 31°06′42″N 9°22′44″W
- Country: Morocco
- Region: Marrakesh-Safi
- Province: Essaouira

Population (2004)
  - Total: 8,934
- Time zone: UTC+0 (GMT)

Aglif is a small town and rural commune in Essaouira Province of the Marrakesh-Safi region of Morocco. At the time of the 2004 census, the commune had a total population of 8934 people living in 1647 households.
