= Ida Ou Kazzou =

- Rural commune and town
- Interactive map of Ida Ou Kazzou
- Coordinates: 30.910833°N 9.601944°W
- Country: Morocco
- Region: Marrakech-Safi
- Province: Essaouira Province

Population (2004)
  - Total: 6,432
- Time zone: UTC+0 (GMT)

Highlighted: Essaouira province, Morocco.

Ida Ou Kazzou is a small town and rural commune in Essaouira Province of the Marrakech-Safi region of Morocco. At the time of the 2004 census, the commune had a total population of 6,432 living in 1,067 households.
