= Masmuda =

Berber tribal confederation

- Berber confederation
- Ethnicity: Berber
- Location: Maghreb with later migration to Iberian Peninsula
- Religion: Islam (predominantly)

The Masmuda (Arabic: المصمودة, romanized: Maṣmūda, Berber: ⵉⵎⵙⵎⵓⴷⵏ) were a Berber tribal confederation, one of the largest in the Maghreb, along with the Zenata and the Sanhaja. Historical Arabic sources locate them within the Maghreb, primarily in territories that fall within the borders of present-day Morocco, with additional communities noted in what is now Algeria.

Today, the Masmuda confederacy largely corresponds to the speakers of the Tashelhit language. The Masmuda are related to the Schleuh people and are also considered to be one of the ancestors of the Schleuhs.

== History ==
=== Establishment ===
Al-Istakhri (10th century) gives only a broad ethnogeographic classification, placing the Masmuda in the Maghreb. Later authors provide more detailed information, notably al-Bakri (11th century), al-Idrisi (12th century), and Ibn Idhari (13th–14th centuries). Based on these writers, the main Masmuda settlement areas in the Maghreb can be summarized as a series of zones located predominantly in present-day Morocco, with references to Masmuda presence in Buna (modern Annaba), Tlemcen, and Tihert in present-day Algeria.

They subsequently crossed into the Islamic Iberian Peninsula, establishing settlements across regions that correspond to modern-day Spain and Portugal.

The Masmuda settled large parts of Morocco, and were largely sedentary and practiced agriculture. The residence of the Masmuda aristocracy was Aghmat in the High Atlas mountains. From the 10th century, the Berber tribes of the Sanhaja and Zanata groups invaded the lands of the Masmuda, followed from the 12th century onwards by Arab Bedouins (see Banu Hilal).

Ibn Tumart united the Masmuda tribes at the beginning of the 12th century and founded the Almohad movement, which subsequently unified the whole of the Maghreb and Andalusia. After the downfall of the Almohads, however, the particularism of the Masmuda peoples prevailed once more, as a result of which they lost their political significance.

By the 16th century, due to the occupation of many of their former lands by the Banu Hilal and the Banu Ma'qil, the Masmuda were mostly restricted to the more mountainous regions of their former domains.

== Subtribes ==
Before the arrival of the Banu Hilal in the late 12th century, the Masmuda were divided largely into three groups: the Ghumara in the north, the Barghawata in the central part of Morocco, and the Masmuda proper in the south.

The anonymous author of the Kitāb Mafāk̲h̲ir al-Barbar (roughly translates as "The Book of the Glories of the Berbers"), a work compiled in 1312 lists the sub-tribes of the Masmuda as: Haha, Regraga, Warika (Ourika), Hazmira, Gadmiwa, Henfisa, Hezerga, Doukkala, Hintata, Maghous, and Tehlawa.

In the north, the Masmuda were generally part of the Ghumara, along with two smaller tribes mentioned by the 11th-century writer al-Bakri: the Aṣṣada, settled between Ksar el-Kebir and Ouazzane, and another tribe settled near Ceuta.

In the south, they were divided widely into two groups: the Masmuda of the plains (north of the Atlas Mountains) and the Masmuda of the mountains. In the plains, the main groups were the Dukkala, the Banu Magir, the Hazmira, the Ragraga, and the Haḥa. The Masmuda of the mountains occupied the High Atlas and the Anti-Atlas mountain regions. In the High Atlas mountains, from east to west, the main groups were: the Glawa, the Haylana (or Aylana), the Warika (or Ourika), the Hazraja, the Aṣṣadan (including the Maṣfiwa, the Maghous, and the Dughagha or Banu Daghugh tribes), the Hintata (including the Ghayghaya tribe), the people of Tinmal, the Ṣawda (or Zawda), the Gadmiwa, and the Ganfīsa (including the Saksawa or Saksiwa), Banu Wawazgit (tifnoute). In the Anti-Atlas and Sous regions, the Masmuda tribes included: the Saktana and the Hargha. Other tribes are mentioned by the 12th-century writer al-Idrisi, but their names are difficult to decipher in existing manuscripts.

According to Ibn Khaldun, the Haskura, or Hasakira group—originally of Sanhaja descent and later settled in the Atlas Mountains—were frequently linked with the Masmuda because of their support for the Almohad cause. Their main tribes were the Zamrawa, the Mughrana, the Garnana, the Ghujdama, the Faṭwaka, the Maṣṭawa, the Hultana, and the Hantifa.

== See also ==
- Banu Dānis (Masmuda clan in al-Andalus)
- Hintata
