= Moulay Bouzarqtoune =

Moulay Bouzerktoun
- Rural commune and town
- Interactive map of Moulay Bouzerktoun
- Coordinates: 31°39′N 9°41′W
- Country: Morocco
- Region: Marrakech-Safi
- Province: Essaouira Province

Population (2004)
  - Total: 5,969
- Time zone: UTC+0 (GMT)

Moulay Bouzerktoun is a small town and rural commune in Essaouira Province of the Marrakech-Safi region of Morocco. At the time of the 2004 census, the commune had a total population of 5,969 people living in 1,069 households.

== Waves and wind ==
From spring to fall the waves are said to be exceptional. Many surfers Consider the Moulay waves to be ideal. Moulay Bouzarqtoune has a Northeast trade-wind named 'Charki', which blows throughout the year. It increases speed from mid-March until mid-September, reaching force 7 at times. The wind is less consistent in the Winter.

Services offered in Moulay Bouzarqtoune include windsurfing lessons and equipment rental.
