= Smimou =

Smimou سميمو ⵙⵎⵉⵎⵓ
- Town
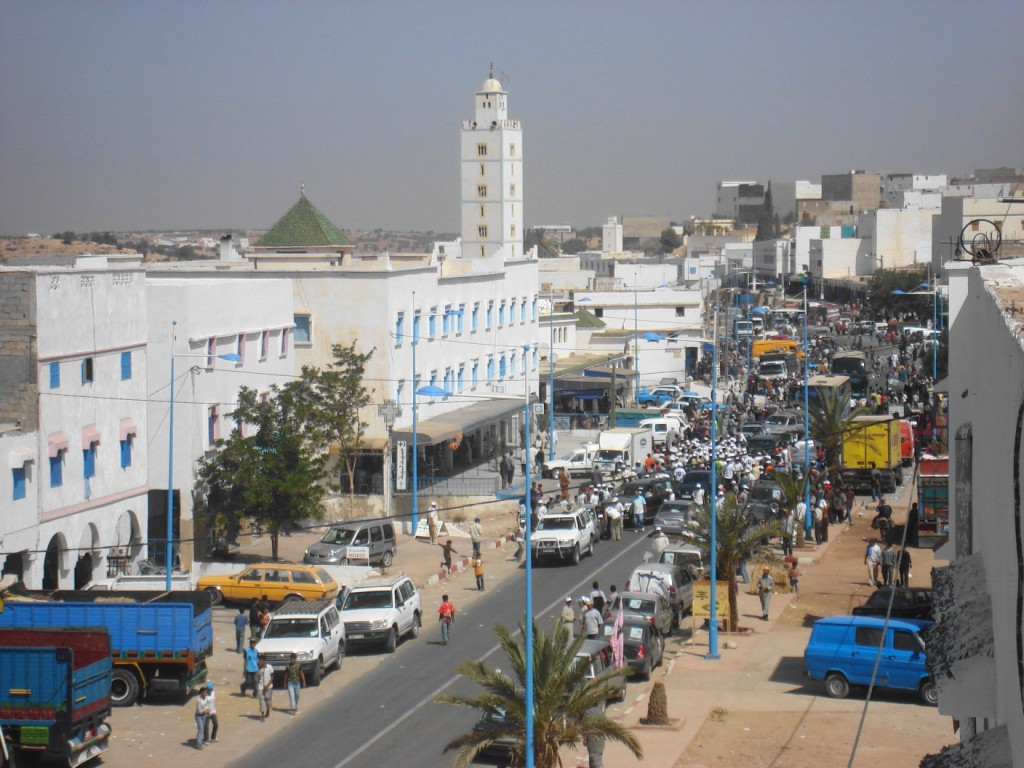
- Interactive map of Smimou
- Country: Morocco
- Region: Marrakesh-Safi
- Province: Essaouira

Population (2004)
  - Total: 2,675
- Time zone: UTC+0 (GMT)

Smimou is a town in Essaouira Province, Marrakesh-Safi, Morocco. According to the 2004 census it has a population of 2,675.
