= Aquermoud =

Aquermoud اقرمود ⴰⵇⵔⵎⵓⴷ
- Rural commune and town
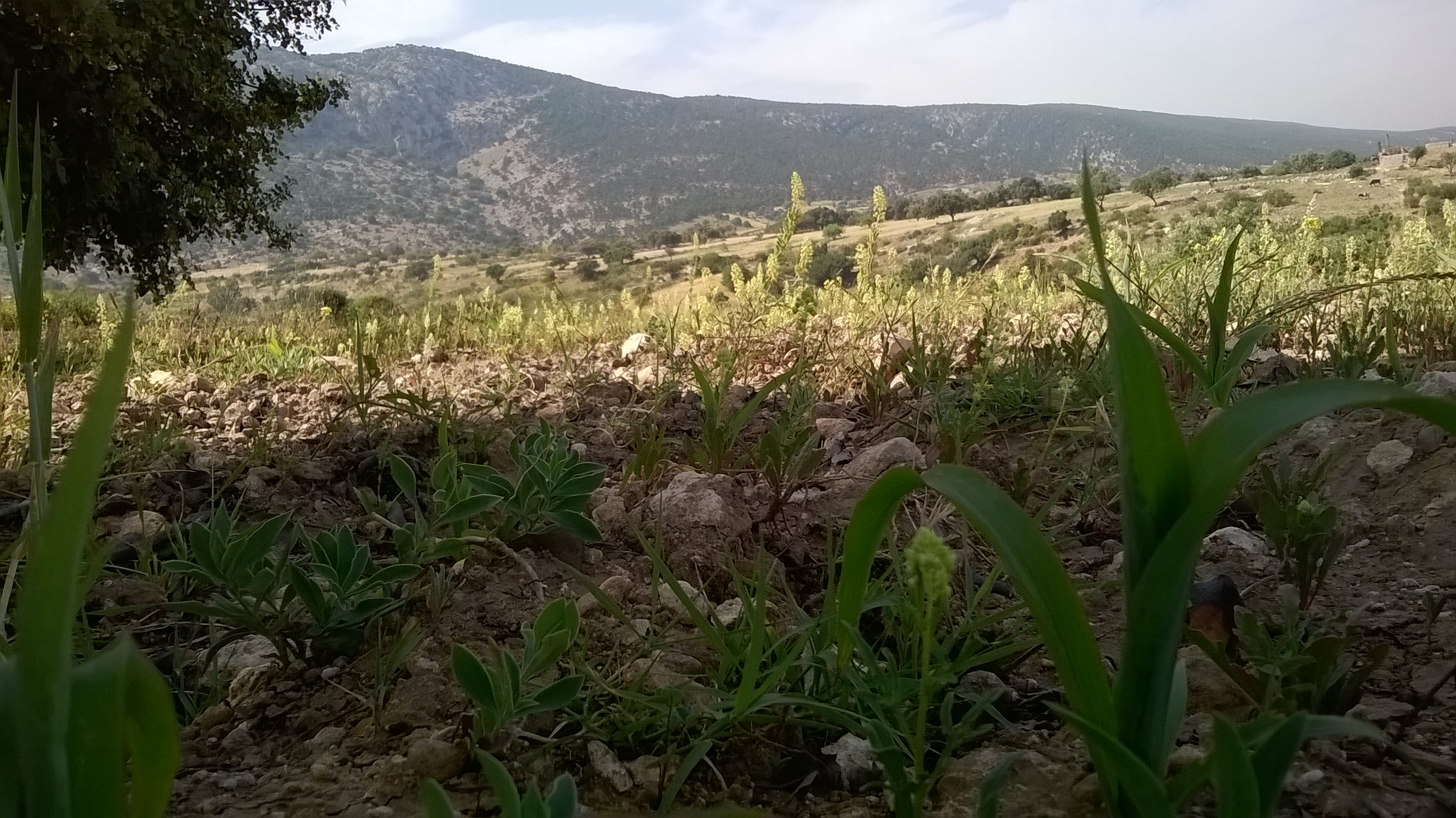
- Interactive map of Aquermoud
- Coordinates: 31°45′51″N 9°32′04″W
- Country: Morocco
- Region: Marrakesh-Tensift-El Haouz
- Province: Essaouira Province

Population (2004)
  - Total: 15,037
- Time zone: UTC+0 (GMT)

Aquermoud is a small town and rural commune in Essaouira Province of the Marrakesh-Tensift-El Haouz region of Morocco. At the time of the 2004 census, the commune had a total population of 15,037 people living in 2,738 households.
