= Sidi M'Hamed Ou Marzouq =

Sidi M'Hamed Ou Marzouq سيدي امحمد اومرزوق
- Rural commune and town
- Interactive map of Sidi M'Hamed Ou Marzouq
- Coordinates: 31°45′53″N 9°00′49″W
- Country: Morocco
- Region: Marrakech-Safi
- Province: Essaouira Province

Population (2004)
  - Total: 6,088
- Time zone: UTC+0 (GMT)

Sidi M'Hamed Ou Marzouq is a small town and rural commune in Essaouira Province of the Marrakech-Safi region of Morocco. At the time of the 2004 census, the commune had a total population of 6,088 people living in 882 households.
