= Tafetachte =

- Town
- Location in Morocco
- Country: Morocco
- Region: Marrakesh-Safi
- Province: Essaouira

Population (2004)
  - Total: 1,174
- Time zone: UTC+0 (GMT)

Tafetachte is a town in Essaouira Province, Marrakesh-Safi, Morocco. According to the 2004 census it has a population of 1,174.
