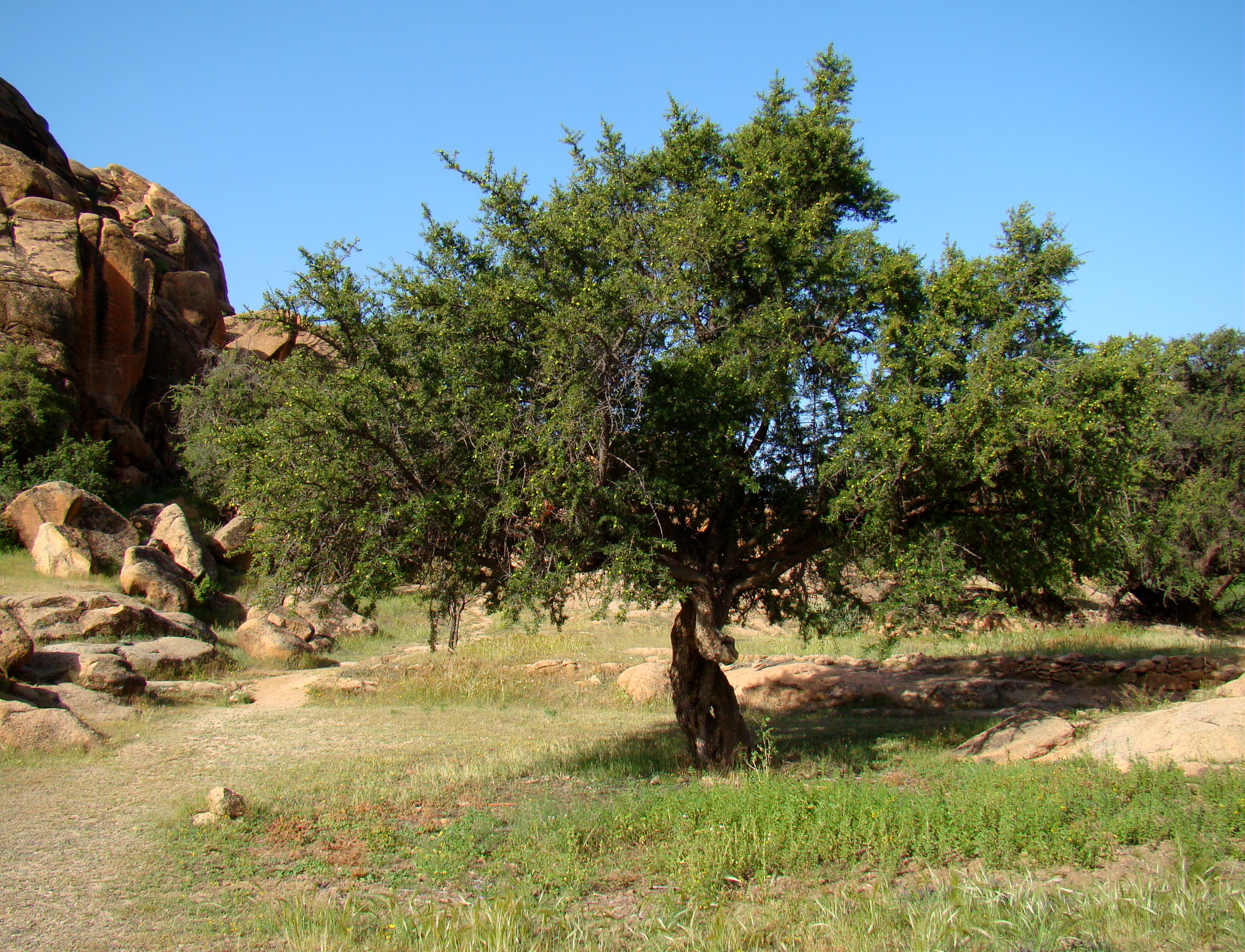
- Near Tafraout, Morocco

Conservation status
- Vulnerable (IUCN 3.1)

Scientific classification
- Kingdom: Plantae
- Clade: Tracheophytes
- Clade: Angiosperms
- Clade: Eudicots
- Clade: Asterids
- Order: Ericales
- Family: Sapotaceae
- Subfamily: Sapotoideae
- Genus: Sideroxylon
- Species: S. spinosum

Binomial name
- Sideroxylon spinosum L. (1753)
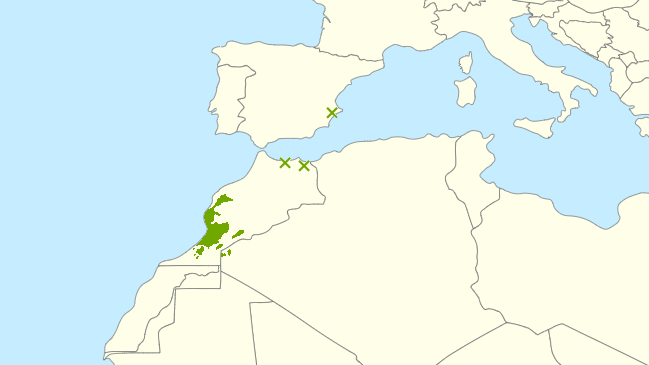
- Native range of A. spinosa

Synonyms
- Argania sideroxylon Roem. & Schult (1819), nom. superfl.; Argania spinosa (L.) Skeels (1911); Argania spinosa var. apiculata Maire (1929); Argania spinosa var. mutica Maire (1929); Elaeodendron argan Retz. (1791); Rhamnus sicula L. (1768); Sideroxylon argan (Retz.) Baill. (1890); Verlangia argan (Retz.) Neck. ex Raf. (1838)

= Sideroxylon spinosum =

Genus of trees

Sideroxylon spinosum, known as argan (Tashelhit: ⴰⵔⴳⴰⵏ, romanized: argan), synonym Argania spinosa, is a species of flowering plant. It is a tree native to the calcareous semi-desert Sous, Chiadma and Haha regions of Morocco, as well as some parts of Tindouf Province in southwestern Algeria, and also to Mauritania and Western Sahara.

Argan trees grow to 8–10 m (26–33 ft) high and live up to approximately 200 years. They are thorny, with gnarled trunks and wide spreading crown. The crown has a circumference of up to 70 m (230 ft) and the branches may lean towards the ground.

== Name ==
The former scientific name Argania was derived from argan, the name of the tree in Shilha, the Berber language which is spoken by the majority of the people living in the areas where the tree is endemic. Shilha Berber has a rich vocabulary for the various parts of the fruit, its stages of ripeness, and its harvesting and processing. The oil is called argan oil. In medieval Arabic pharmacological sources, the tree is known as harjān, a distortion of the Berber word argan.

== Description ==
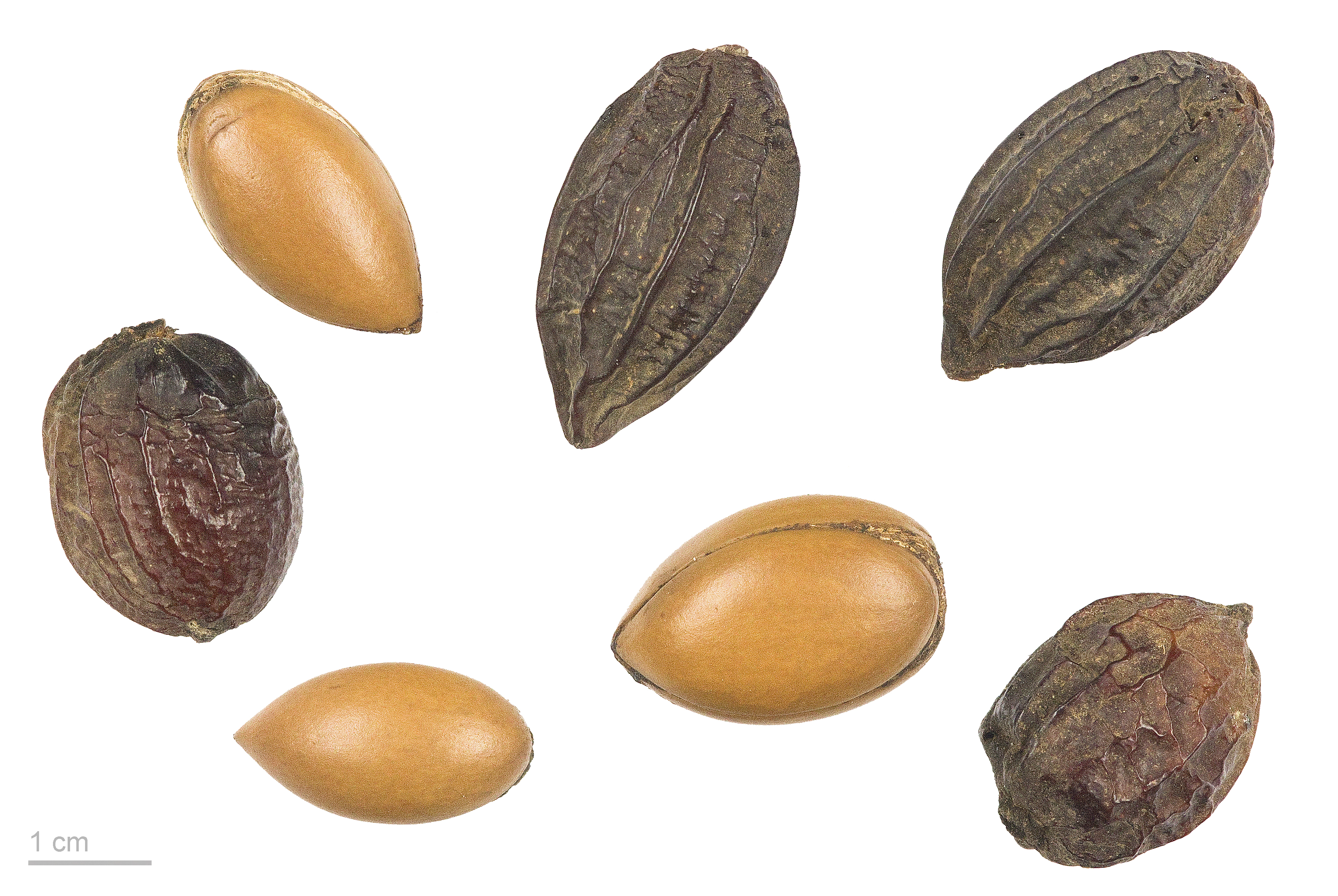
fruit and seeds

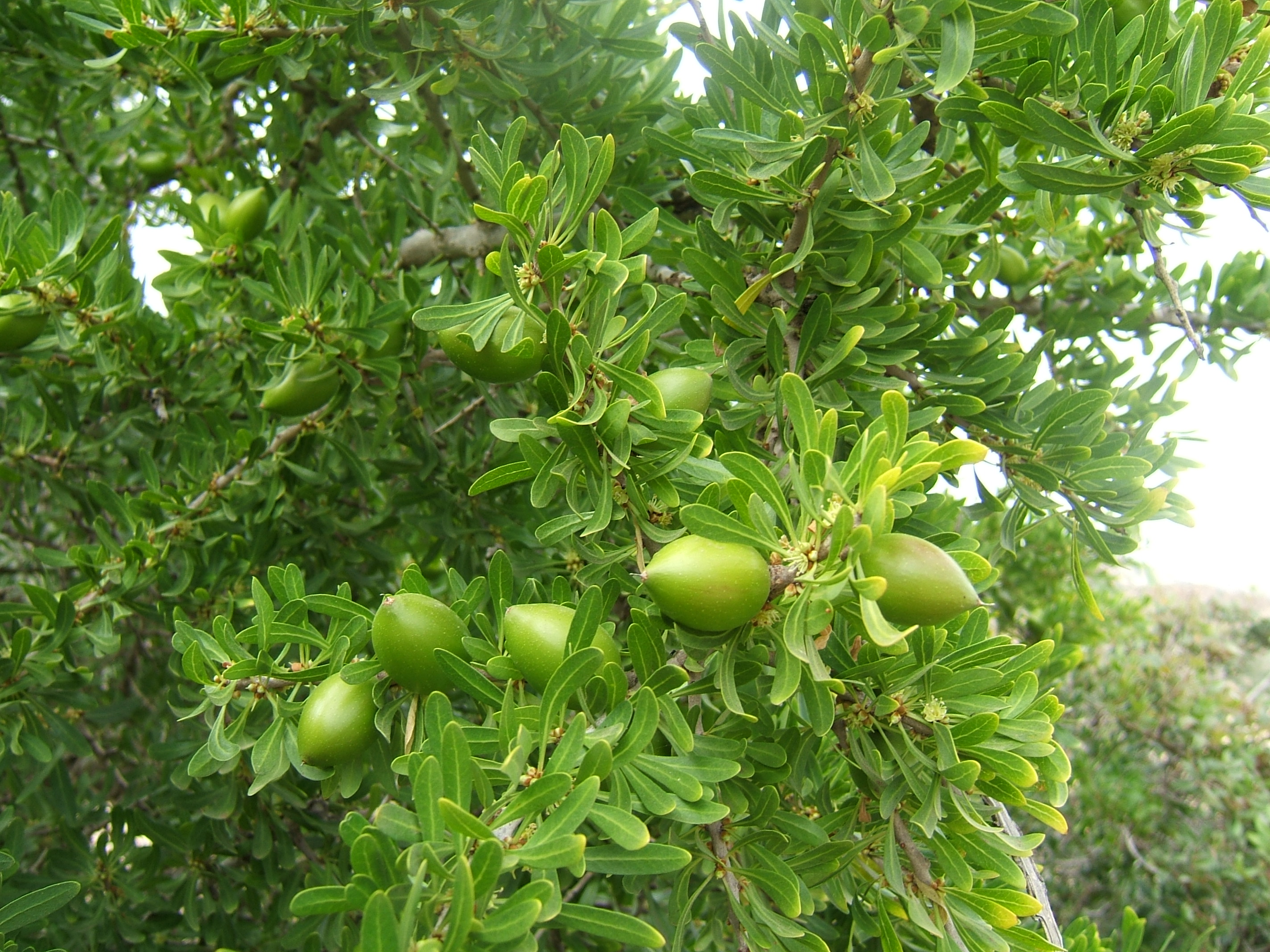
Foliage, flowers and immature fruit

The leaves are small, 2–4 cm (3/4–1 5/8 in) long, and oval with a rounded apex. The flowers are small, with five pale yellow-green petals; flowering in April. The fruit is 2–4 cm long and 1.5–3 cm (5/8–1 1/8 in) broad, with a thick, bitter peel surrounding a sweet-smelling but unpleasantly flavoured layer of pulpy pericarp. This surrounds the very hard nut, which contains one (occasionally two or three) small, oil-rich seeds. The fruit takes over a year to mature, ripening in June to July of the following year.

== Ecology ==
There are many types of Argan habitats, with varying degrees of aridity based on latitude and distance from the Atlantic Ocean :

- Haha region: In the coastal territory where the High Atlas mountains reach the Atlantic, argan trees grow along prominent headlands and seaside cliffs, including Cape Sim, Cape Tafelney, and Cape Ghir. In these areas, they grow alongside companion species like wild Olive (Olea europaea) and Lentisc (Pistacia lentiscus).
- South of Agadir: South of Agadir, oceanic influences shape the argan woodlands. The pre-steppe environments are characterized by a high concentration of various spurges (including Euphorbia beaumierana, E. echinus, and E. regis-jubae, as well as Salsola longifolia and S. vermiculata).
- Inland arid zone: Further inland across the Souss Valley and the Anti-Atlas range, the landscape transitions to a more xerophytic community. Here, the argan is found near Acacia gummifera with an understorey dominated by species such as Ziziphus lotus, Withania adpressa, Launaea arborescens, Senecio anteuphorbium, and Genista ferox.
- Transition borders: Along the fringes of its distribution, the argan integrates with alternative forest communities. It mixes with Barbary arborvitae (Tetraclinis articulata) and Phoenician juniper (Juniperus phoenicea) across the Haha, Chiadma, and Abda regions. On the western slopes of the High Atlas, it overlaps with Holm Oak (Quercus ilex) and Juniper (Juniperus oxycedrus), while shifting toward Acacia species as the habitat nears pre-desert territory.

== Cultivation ==
The argan tree used to grow throughout North Africa, but today it only grows in southwestern Morocco. Argan is perfectly adapted to the region's harsh environment, with the ability to survive extreme heat (over 50 °C), drought and poor soil. Although numbers are dwindling, argan is the second most abundant tree in Moroccan forests, with over twenty million trees living in the region and playing a vital role in the food chain and environment. The tree's roots grow deep into the ground in search of water, which helps bind soil and prevents erosion. Much of the region has resisted the advance of the Sahara desert due to the argan tree, and it therefore plays an irreplaceable part in the ecological balance of the region.

In Morocco, arganeraie forests now only cover some 8,280 km^{2} (3,200 sq mi) and are designated as a UNESCO biosphere reserve. Their area has shrunk by about half during the last 100 years, due to charcoal making, grazing, increasingly intensive cultivation and the expansion of urban and rural settlements. Livestock numbers have increased substantially, with signs of overgrazing and over browsing in the argan forest. Browsing directly harms the existing, mature argan trees as goats will climb high into the branches of an argan tree to reach its fruit. Overgrazing can cause soil erosion, affects the microclimate of the forest by reducing ground cover and surface humidity and increasing temperature, and impedes the long term regeneration of the forest.

The best hope for the conservation of the trees may lie in the recent development of a thriving export market for argan oil as a high-value product. However, the wealth brought by argan oil export has also created threats to argan trees in the form of increased goat population. Locals use the newfound wealth to buy more goats and the goats stunt the growth of the argan trees by climbing up and eating their leaves and fruit. It is reported that the display of the tree climbing goats is staged or faked in areas popular with tourists, as the goats only very infrequently climb the trees without human intervention.

Argan is also cultivated in the Arabah and Negev regions of Israel.

== Uses ==
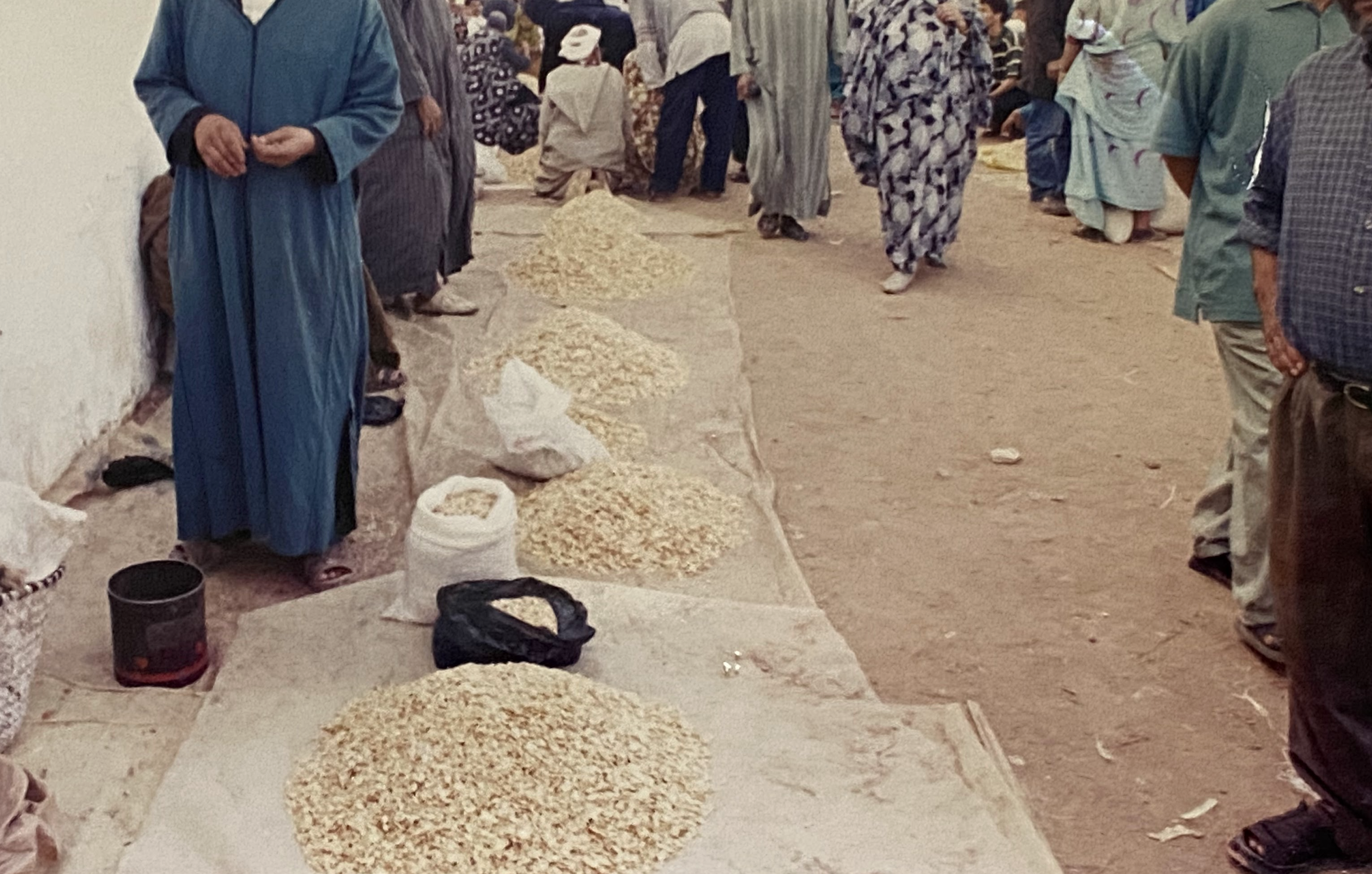
Souk selling argan seeds in Inezgane, Morocco

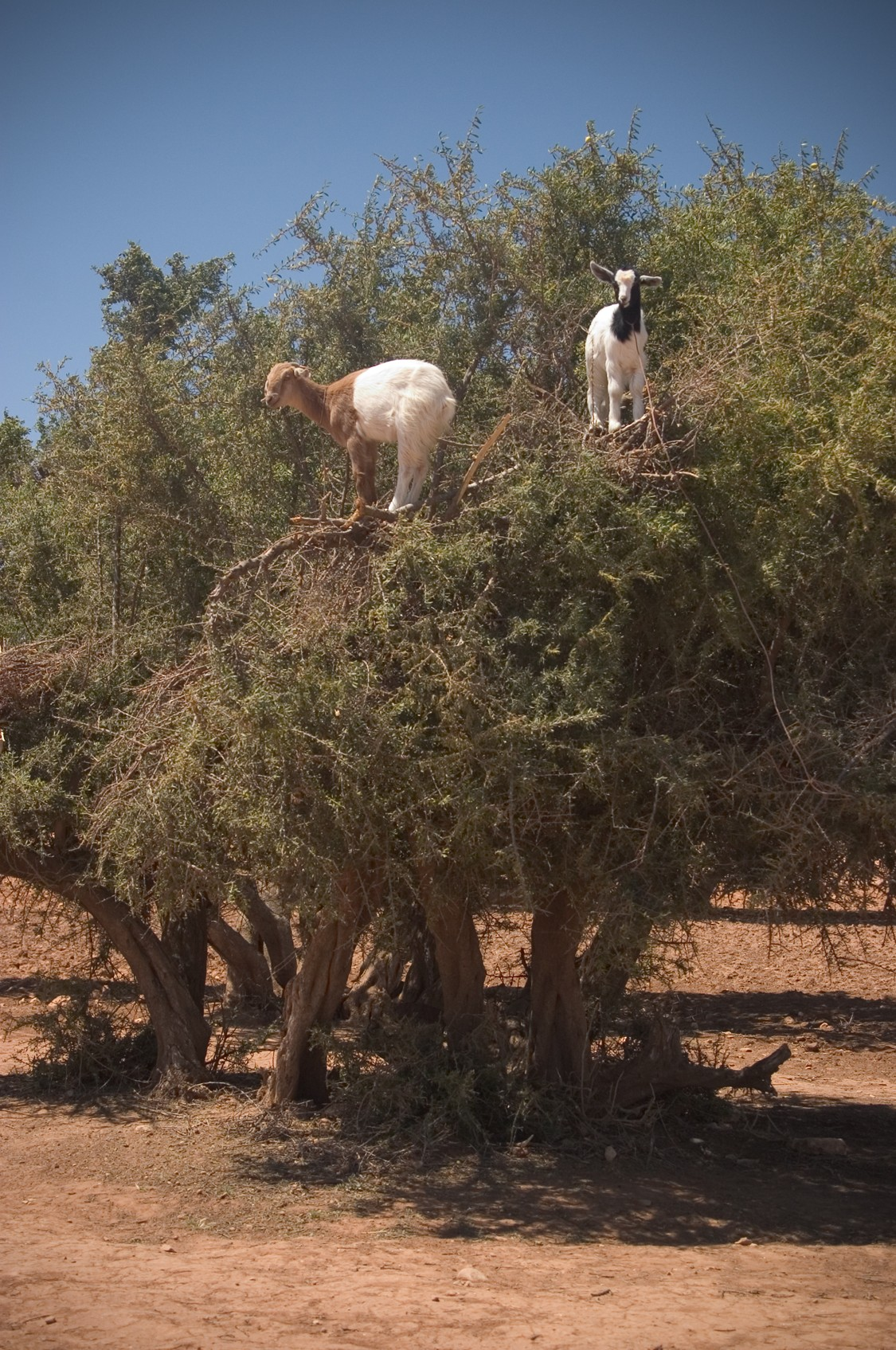
Goats climbing an argan tree in Morocco

The argan tree has played a role in the cultures of the Berber people living there for hundreds of years. Argan is a multi-purpose tree and each part of it is usable as a food or economic resource. The fruit can be eaten, oil can be extracted from the nuts and the tree's wood can be used for fuel. The tree has therefore played a vital socio-economic role in local culture, and currently provides a significant source of food and income for around three million people, over two million of whom live in rural areas.

In some parts of Morocco, argan takes the place of the olive as a source of forage, oil, timber, and fuel in Berber society.

=== Fruit ===
Argan fruit falls in July, when they are black and dry. Until this happens, goats are kept out of the argan woodlands by wardens. Rights to collect the fruit are controlled by law and village traditions. The "nuts" are gathered after fruit consumption and spat out by ruminating goats. Seeds being spat out by the goats constitutes one mechanism of seed dispersal.

=== Argan oil ===
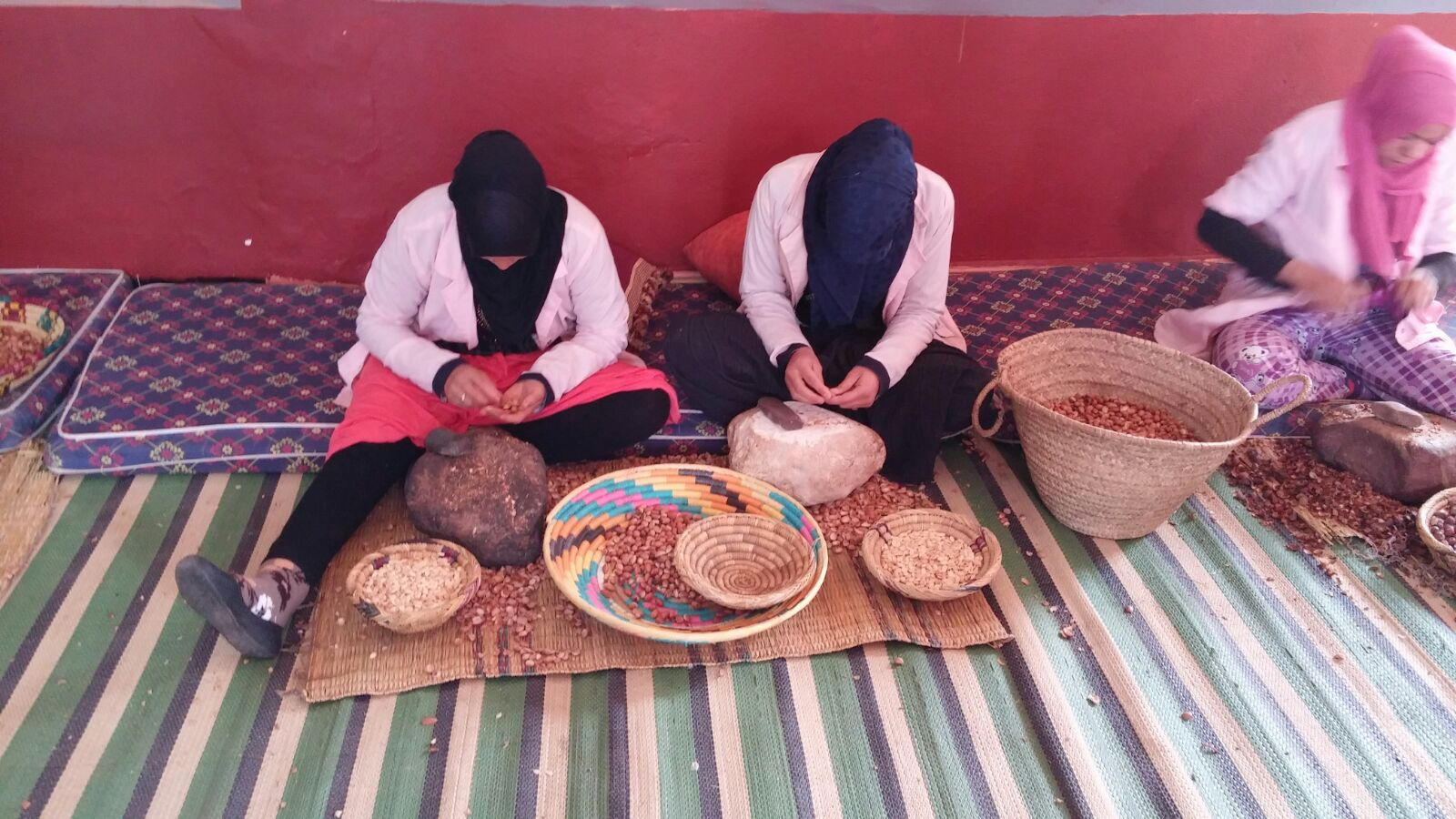
The production of the oil is done by hand

Argan oil is produced by several women's co-operatives in the southwestern parts of Morocco. The most labour-intensive part of oil-extraction is removal of the soft pulp (used to feed animals) and the cracking by hand, between two stones, of the hard nut. In the edible variety the seeds are then removed and gently roasted, This roasting accounts for part of the oil's distinctive, nutty flavour, while in the cosmetic variety the seeds are processed without applying heat. The traditional technique for oil extraction is to grind the roasted seeds to paste, with a little water, in a stone rotary quern. The paste is then squeezed by hand to extract the oil. The extracted paste is still oil-rich and is used as animal feed. Oil produced this way can be stored and used for three to six months, and can be produced as needed from kernels, which can keep for 20 years unopened. Dry-pressing is becoming increasingly important for oil produced for sale, as this method allows for faster extraction, and the oil produced can be used for 12–18 months after extraction.

The oil contains 80% unsaturated fatty acids, is rich in essential fatty acids, and is more resistant to oxidation than olive oil. Argan oil is used for dipping bread, on couscous and salads, and for other similar uses. A dip for bread known as amlou is made from argan oil, almonds, and peanuts, sometimes sweetened by honey or sugar. The unroasted oil is traditionally used as a treatment for skin diseases, and has become favoured by European cosmetics manufacturers.

Argan oil is sold in Morocco as a luxury item. Sales of the product have grown since being marketed by the cosmetics industry in the US and Europe in the early 21st century. Its price is notable compared to other oils.

Argan oil contains:

- 46% Oleic acid
- 32% Linoleic acid
- 12% Palmitic acid
- 6% Stearic acid

=== Animal feed ===
Argan trees are a major source of forage for sheep, goats, camels and cattle. The fruit and leaves are readily consumed by livestock. The press cake resulting from oil extraction can also be sun dried and fed to ruminants. Bees can nest in argan trees, making them sites for wild honey harvesting.

== International recognition ==
=== Geographical indication ===
The unique geographical properties of the region led to an application with the European Union to protect Argane (argan in French) by the Moroccan government. The application for Argane to become a Protected Geographical Indication was made in October 2011 with the European Commission.

=== Intangible Cultural Heritage ===
Argan, practices and know-how concerning the argan tree
- UNESCO Intangible Cultural Heritage
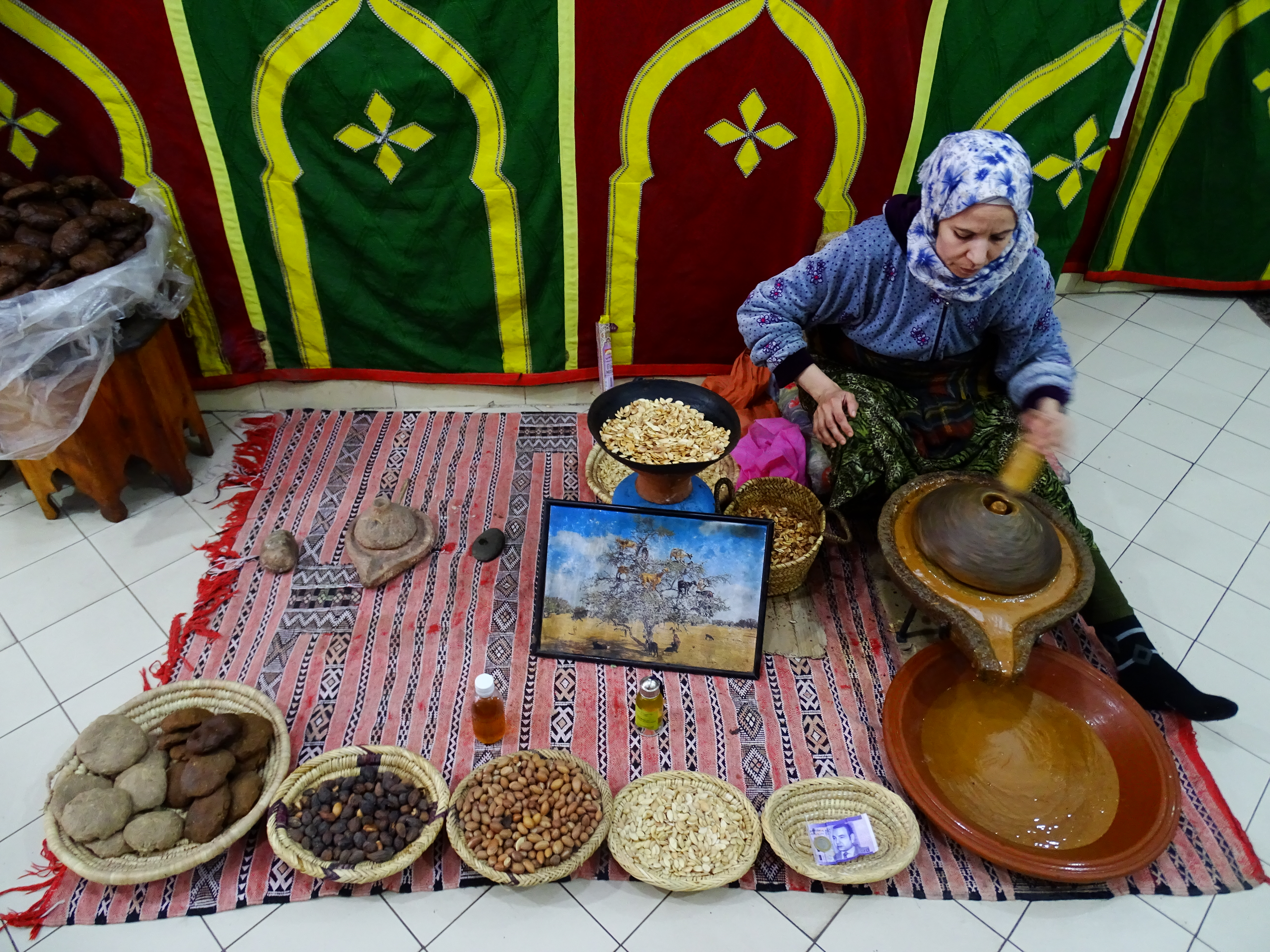
- Argan paste making
- Country: Morocco
- Reference: 00955
- Region: Arab States

Inscription history
- Inscription: 2014 (14th session)
- List: Representative

In 2014, the United Nations Educational, Scientific and Cultural Organization (UNESCO), inscribed "Argan, practices and know-how concerning the argan tree" on the Representative List of the Intangible Cultural Heritage of Humanity, upon Moroccan request, for the protection and safeguarding of traditions, knowledge, practices, and crafts related to the argan tree.

=== United Nations International Day ===
On 3 March 2021, the United Nations General Assembly adopted a resolution to proclaim 10 May the International Day of Argania, an observance to be celebrated annually. Amongst the motivations for this proclamation were the importance of Argania to sustainable development in areas where it is endemic. The UN resolution was submitted by Morocco, and was co-sponsored by 113 member states of the United Nations before being adopted by consensus.
