= Haha (tribe) =

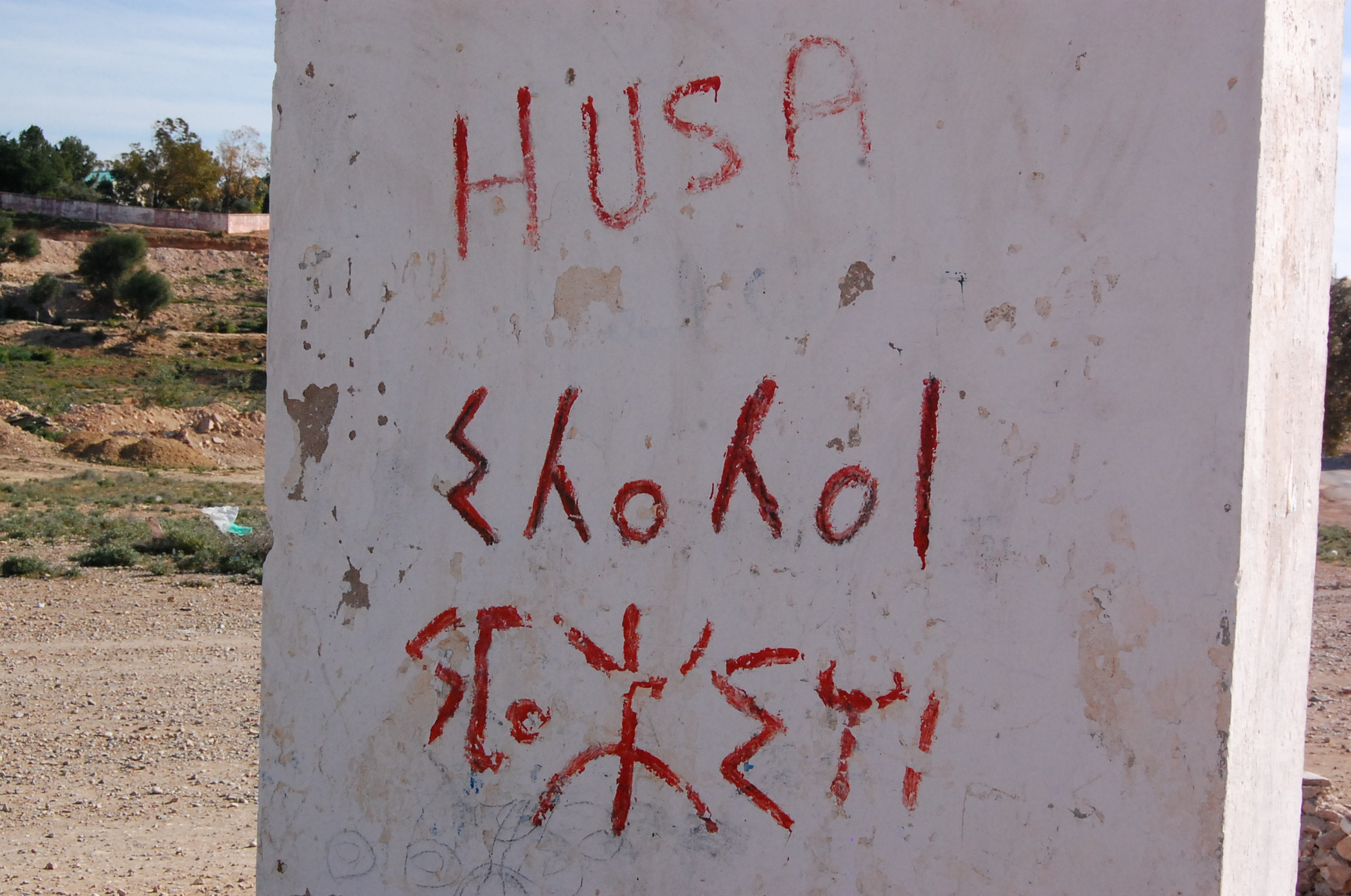
Writing in Tifinagh saying "the people of Haha are Berbers" (Tachelhit: ⵉⵃⴰⵃⴰⵏ ⵉⵎⴰⵣⵉⵖⵏ, romanized: iḥaḥan imaziɣn)

The Haha or Iḥaḥan (in Shilha) (Arabic: حاحا, romanized: Ḥāḥā) is a Moroccan confederation of Masmouda Berber tribes in the Western High Atlas in Morocco. They identify themselves as a tribal confederacy of the Chleuh people, and speak the Shilha language. Their region stretches along from the city of Essaouira south to the Souss Valley, mainly on the Atlantic coast.

== History ==
Haha Confederation Ihihiyen
- 1600s–1912
- Status: Tribal Confederation
- Capital: Tamanar
- Religion: Islam
- History
  - Formation of Masmuda alliance: 1600s
  - Integration into French Protectorate: 1912
Succeeded by
French protectorate in Morocco
- Today part of: Morocco

Despite being Islamized, the Haha lack Arab blood. They were possibly Islamized by Uqba ibn Nafi. The confederation first appeared in history as a supporter of the Almoravids in the 11th century and later the Almohads. Ibn Khaldun described the Haha as proud and courageous and other authors like Leo Africanus and Marmol also spoke about the Haha and their territory.

Writing about the province of Haha, Leo Africanus says:

Haha is a harsh land, with many high, craggy mountains, forests and valleys, and narrow streams. It is well populated and full of goats and donkeys, but fewer sheep, cattle and horses; little fruit grows there, not because the land is poor. They grow little wheat but large amounts of barley and millet, along with honey, which they eat without knowing to keep the wax too. There are many thorny trees that produce fruit somewhat like Spanish olives, which they call argan in their language, and from which they make a stinking, foul oil, used for food and fuel.

In the 1939 census, they had a population of 84,000 people and had 20 Jews among them.

== Tribal composition ==
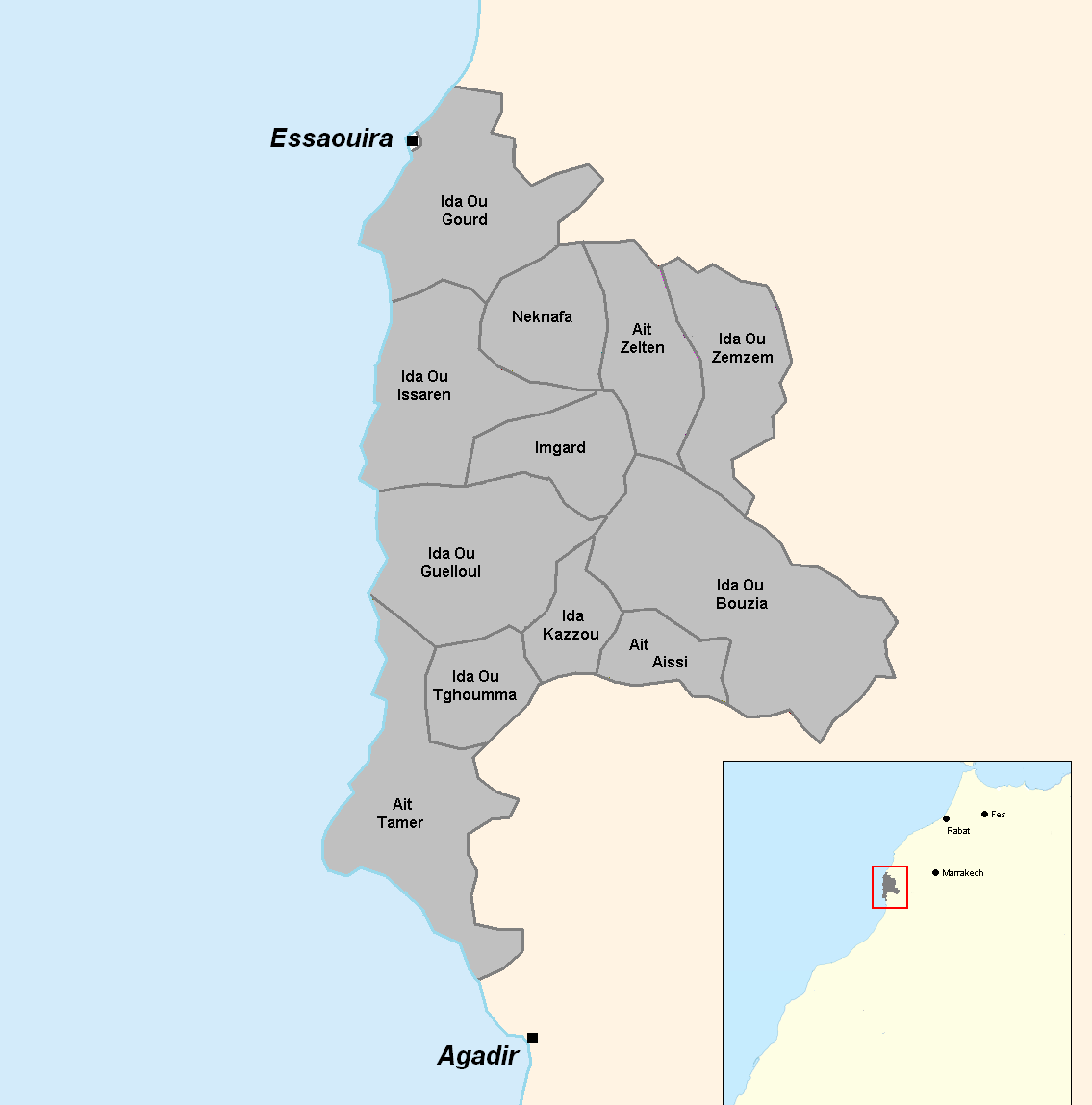
Map representing the 12 Haha tribes and their territory.

The Haha are made up of the following tribes:

- Ida Ou Gourd
- Ida Ou Issaren
- Ida Ou Guelloul
- Aït Amer
- Ineknafen
- Imgrad
- Ida Ou Kazzou
- Ida Ou Tghemma
- Aït Zelten
- Ida Ou Zemzem
- Ida Ou Bouzia
- Aït ʿIssi

== Notable figures ==
- Saïd Taghmaoui
- Nayef Aguerd

== See also ==
- Masmuda
- Shilha people
- Aït Atta
- Ait Yafelman
