= Marrakesh-Tensift-El Haouz =

Marrakesh-Tensift-El Haouz مراكش تانسيفت الحوز
- Region
- Location in Morocco
- Coordinates: 31°37′N 8°0′W
- Country: Morocco
- Capital: Marrakesh

Area
  - Total: 31,160 km^{2} (12,030 sq mi)

Population (2014 census)
  - Total: 3,576,673
  - Density: 114.8/km^{2} (297.3/sq mi)
- Time zone: UTC+0 (WET)
  - Summer (DST): UTC+1 (WEST)

Marrakesh–Tensift–El Haouz (Arabic: مراكش تانسيفت الحوز) was formerly one of the 16 regions of Morocco from 1997 to 2015. It was situated in central Morocco. It covered an area of 31,160 km² and had a population of 3,576,673 (2014 census). The capital is Marrakesh. In 2015, the region annexed Safi and Youssoufia Provinces (both formerly from the Doukkala-Abda Region) to become the Region of Marrakesh-Safi.

== Administrative divisions ==
The former region comprised the following provinces and prefectures :

- The prefecture of Marrakesh–Medina (now part of the Prefecture of Marrakesh)
- The prefecture of Marrakesh–Menara (now part of the Prefecture of Marrakesh)
- The prefecture of Sidi Youssef Ben Ali (now part of the Prefecture of Marrakesh)
- Al Haouz Province
- Chichaoua Province
- El Kelâat Es-Sraghna Province
- Essaouira Province
- Rehamna Province

== History ==
This region contains some of the richest ancient history in North Africa. Notably the Phoenician settlement of Mogador, originally excavated by André Jodin is along the coast at modern day Essaouira.

== Bibliography ==
- C.Michael Hogan, Mogador: promontory fort, The Megalithic Portal, ed. Andy Burnham, Nov. 2, 2007
- Jean-François Troin and Mohamed Berriane (2002) Maroc: régions, pays, territoires, Published by Maisonneuve & Larose, 502 pages ISBN 2-7068-1630-9, ISBN 978-2-7068-1630-7
