= List of monuments in Marrakesh =

This is a list of monuments that are classified by the Moroccan ministry of culture around Marrakesh.

== Monuments and sites in Marrakesh ==
Image		Name	Location	Coordinates	Identifier
	Upload Photo	Koutoubia Mosque	Marrakesh	31°37'26.846"N, 7°59'36.748"W	pc_architecture/idpcm:08903F
	Upload Photo	Bab Aghmat	Marrakesh	31°37'25.914"N, 7°58'28.409"W	pc_architecture/sanae:390026
	Upload Photo	El Badi Palace	Marrakesh	31°37'5.99"N, 7°59'8.99"W	pc_architecture/sanae:320001
	Upload Photo	Majorelle Garden	Marrakesh	31°38'29"N, 8°0'10"W	pc_architecture/sanae:180017
	Upload Photo	Ibn Salah Mosque	Marrakesh	31°37'48"N, 7°58'48"W	pc_architecture/idpcm:BD7F09
	Upload Photo	Menara gardens	Marrakesh	31°37'0.131"N, 8°1'27.253"W	pc_architecture/sanae:180002
	Upload Photo	Saadian Tombs	Marrakesh Prefecture	31°37'2"N, 7°59'19"W	pc_architecture/sanae:490001
	Upload Photo	Bahia Palace	Marrakesh	31°37'17.73"N, 7°58'56.03"W	pc_architecture/sanae:320002
	Upload Photo	Jemaa el-Fnaa	Marrakesh	31°37'33.496"N, 7°59'20.753"W	pc_immateriel/igpcm:160C8E
	Upload Photo	Arsat Moulay Abdessalam Garden	Marrakesh	31°37'48"N, 8°0'0"W	pc_architecture/sanae:180066
	Upload Photo	La Mamounia	Marrakesh	31°37'15"N, 7°59'50"W	pc_architecture/sanae:340018
	Upload Photo	Dar Si Said Museum	Marrakesh	31°37'24"N, 7°59'1"W	pc_architecture/sanae:320124
	Upload Photo	Agdal Gardens	Marrakesh	31°36'22"N, 7°58'47"W	pc_architecture/sanae:180018
	Upload Photo	Bab Agnaou	Marrakesh	31°37'3.4"N, 7°59'26.4"W	pc_architecture/sanae:390028
	Upload Photo	Bab Ksiba	Marrakesh	31°36'43.92"N, 7°59'21.48"W	pc_architecture/sanae:390127
	Upload Photo	Bab er-Robb	Marrakesh	31°37'1.92"N, 7°59'26.16"W	pc_architecture/sanae:390021
	Upload Photo	Al-Mansour Mosque	Marrakesh	31°37'3.644"N, 7°59'20.213"W	pc_architecture/idpcm:2DFE9C
	Upload Photo	Ibn Yusuf Mosque	Marrakesh	31°37'54.93"N, 7°59'13.78"W	pc_architecture/idpcm:BFF816
	Upload Photo	Douirat Fasisat	Marrakesh		pc_architecture/sanae:320131
	Upload Photo	Sultan garden	Marrakesh		pc_architecture/sanae:180022
	Upload Photo	Arsat Ed-Djaj garden	Marrakesh		pc_architecture/sanae:180020
	Upload Photo	Dar el Beida Palace hospital	Marrakesh	31°36'13.414"N, 7°58'53.303"W	pc_architecture/sanae:320130
	Upload Photo	Enclosure of Agdal (Marrakech)	Marrakesh	31°35'35.520"N, 7°59'48.451"W	pc_architecture/sanae:410034
	Upload Photo	Bab Ahmer	Marrakesh	31°36'52.985"N, 7°58'35.184"W	pc_architecture/idpcm:BCDF3
	Upload Photo	Bab Dukkala	Marrakesh	31°38'2.749"N, 7°59'56.166"W	pc_architecture/sanae:390022
	Upload Photo	Bab Debbagh	Marrakesh	31°38'2.915"N, 7°58'44.548"W	pc_architecture/sanae:390024
	Upload Photo	Bab El Khemis (Marrakech)	Marrakesh	31°38'29.072"N, 7°59'7.487"W	pc_architecture/sanae:390023
	Upload Photo	Bab Laarissa	Marrakesh	31°37'46.729"N, 7°59'58.870"W	pc_architecture/idpcm:CB5EB
	Upload Photo	Bassin Dar El Hana	Marrakesh	31°35'35.135"N, 7°58'37.247"W	pc_architecture/sanae:040002
	Upload Photo	Bassin El Gharsiya	Marrakesh	31°35'38.598"N, 7°58'20.395"W	pc_architecture/sanae:040004
	Upload Photo	Menara Bassin	Marrakesh	31°36'48"N, 8°1'18"W	pc_architecture/sanae:040003
	Upload Photo	Bab Doukkala Fountain	Marrakesh	31°38'2.782"N, 7°59'56.155"W	pc_architecture/sanae:120002
	Upload Photo	Shrob ou shouf fountain	Marrakesh	31°38'0.794"N, 7°59'15.673"W	pc_architecture/sanae:120003
	Upload Photo	Mouassine Fountain	Marrakesh	31°37'47.986"N, 7°59'21.412"W	pc_architecture/sanae:120001
	Upload Photo	Mamounia garden	Marrakesh	31°37'11.370"N, 7°59'48.224"W	pc_architecture/sanae:180019
	Upload Photo	Koutoubia Gardens	Marrakesh	31°37'23.473"N, 7°59'41.777"W	pc_architecture/sanae:180071
	Upload Photo	Ben Salah Medersa	Marrakesh		pc_architecture/sanae:270020
	Upload Photo	Sidi Youssef Ben Ali mausoleum	Marrakesh		pc_architecture/idpcm:252694
	Upload Photo	Bab Aylan	Marrakesh	31°37'47.824"N, 7°58'24.589"W	pc_architecture/sanae:390025
	Upload Photo	Bab Doukkala Grand Mosque	Marrakesh	31°37'54.113"N, 7°59'45.301"W	pc_architecture/idpcm:0CA6C
	Upload Photo	Medina of Marrakesh	Marrakesh	31°37'53.0"N, 7°59'12.1"W	pc_architecture/sanae:280004
	Upload Photo	Agadir Anzili	Amizmiz		pc_architecture/sanae:010050
	Upload Photo	Palmeraie	Marrakesh	31°41'10.04755"N, 7°57'44.20361"W	pc_architecture/sanae:330001
	Upload Photo	Tahannaout	Al Haouz Province	31°21'5.04"N, 7°57'2.99"W	pc_architecture/sanae:520004
	Upload Photo	Timichi	Oukaimden	31°11'36.938"N, 7°46'7.345"W	pc_architecture/sanae:520005
	Upload Photo	Agdal of Marrakesh	Marrakesh	31°35'21.57252"N, 7°59'50.30426"W	pc_architecture/sanae:020001
	Upload Photo	Asni	Marrakesh	31°14'31.844"N, 7°59'8.351"W	pc_architecture/sanae:520006
	Upload Photo	The Great Mosque of Tinmel	Tinmel	30°59'5.464"N, 8°13'42.010"W	pc_architecture/sanae:290007
	Upload Photo	Tinmel (old town)	Tinmel	30°59'4.783"N, 8°13'41.257"W	pc_architecture/sanae:410051
	Upload Photo	Kechla Aoukechtin	Asni	31°14'35.484"N, 7°58'53.022"W	pc_architecture/sanae:190071
	Upload Photo	Ourika River	Ourika	31°24'N, 7°47'W	
	Upload Photo	Oued N'fis old bridge	Amizmiz	31°34'49.638"N, 8°11'56.490"W	pc_architecture/sanae:380002
	Upload Photo	Ruins of Aoukechtim Kechla	Tinmel	30°58'56.554"N, 8°13'50.444"W	pc_architecture/sanae:070006
	Upload Photo	Taohdirt	Tahannaout	31°21'11.812"N, 7°56'58.675"W	pc_architecture/sanae:460003
