= Atlas Mountains =

North African mountain range

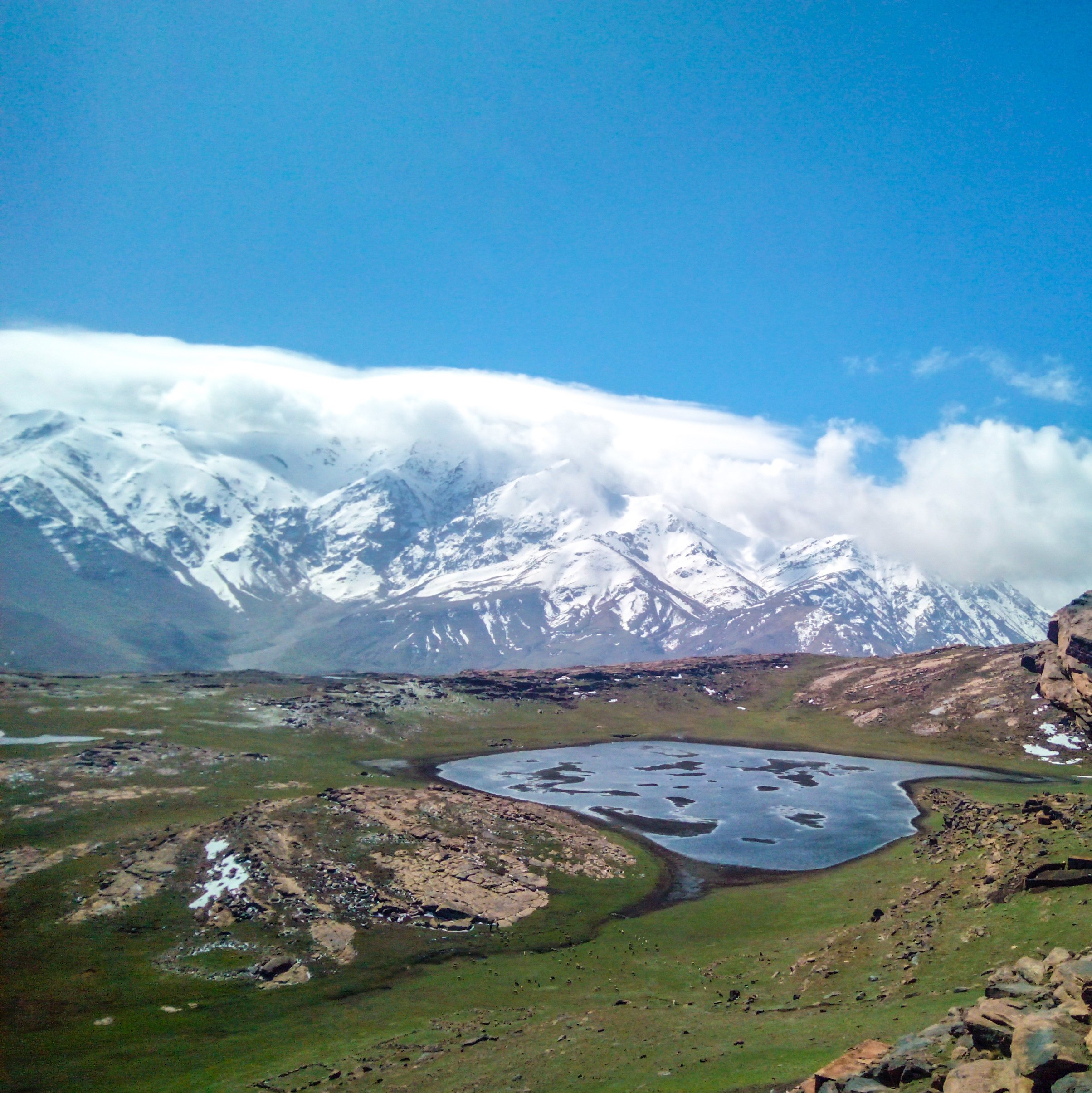
- Jebel Yagour, Morocco

Highest point
- Peak: Toubkal, Morocco
- Elevation: 4,167 m (13,671 ft)
- Listing: Mountain ranges
- Coordinates: 31°03′35″N 7°54′54″W

Dimensions
- Length: 2,500 km (1,600 mi)

Geography
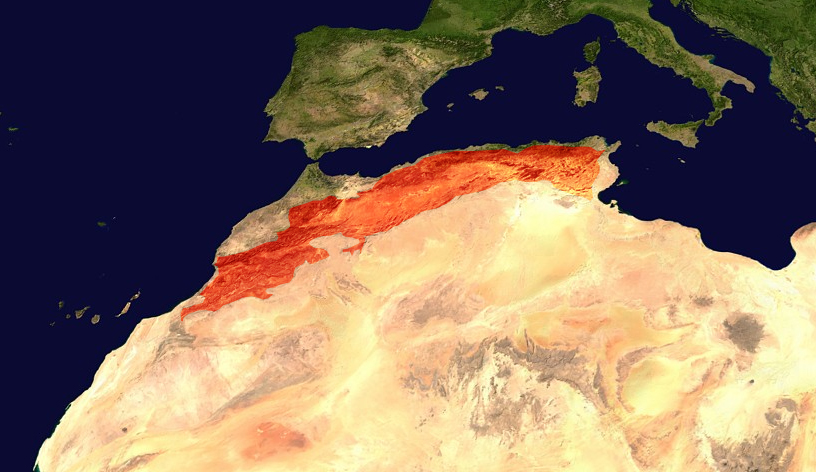
- The location of the Atlas Mountains (red) across North Africa
- Countries: Morocco; Algeria; Tunisia
- Region: Maghreb

Geology
- Rock age: Precambrian

The Atlas Mountains (Note: Berber languages: ⵉⴷⵓⵔⴰⵔ ⵏ ⵡⴰⵟⵍⴰⵚ, romanized: idurar en waṭlaṣ) are a mountain range in the Maghreb in North Africa. They separate the Sahara from the Mediterranean Sea and the Atlantic Ocean; the mountain range stretches around 2,500 km (1,600 mi) through Morocco, Algeria and Tunisia. The mountains are associated with the Titan Atlas. The range's highest peak is Toubkal, in central Morocco, with an elevation of 4,167 metres (13,671 ft). The Atlas Mountains are primarily inhabited by Berber populations.

The terms for 'mountain' are Adrar and adras in some Berber languages, and these terms are believed to be cognates of the toponym Atlas. The Atlas Mountains are home to a number of animals and plants which are mostly found within Africa but some of which can be found in Europe. Many of these species are endangered and a few are already extinct. The weather is generally cool but summers are sunny, and the average temperature there is 25 °C.

== Geology ==
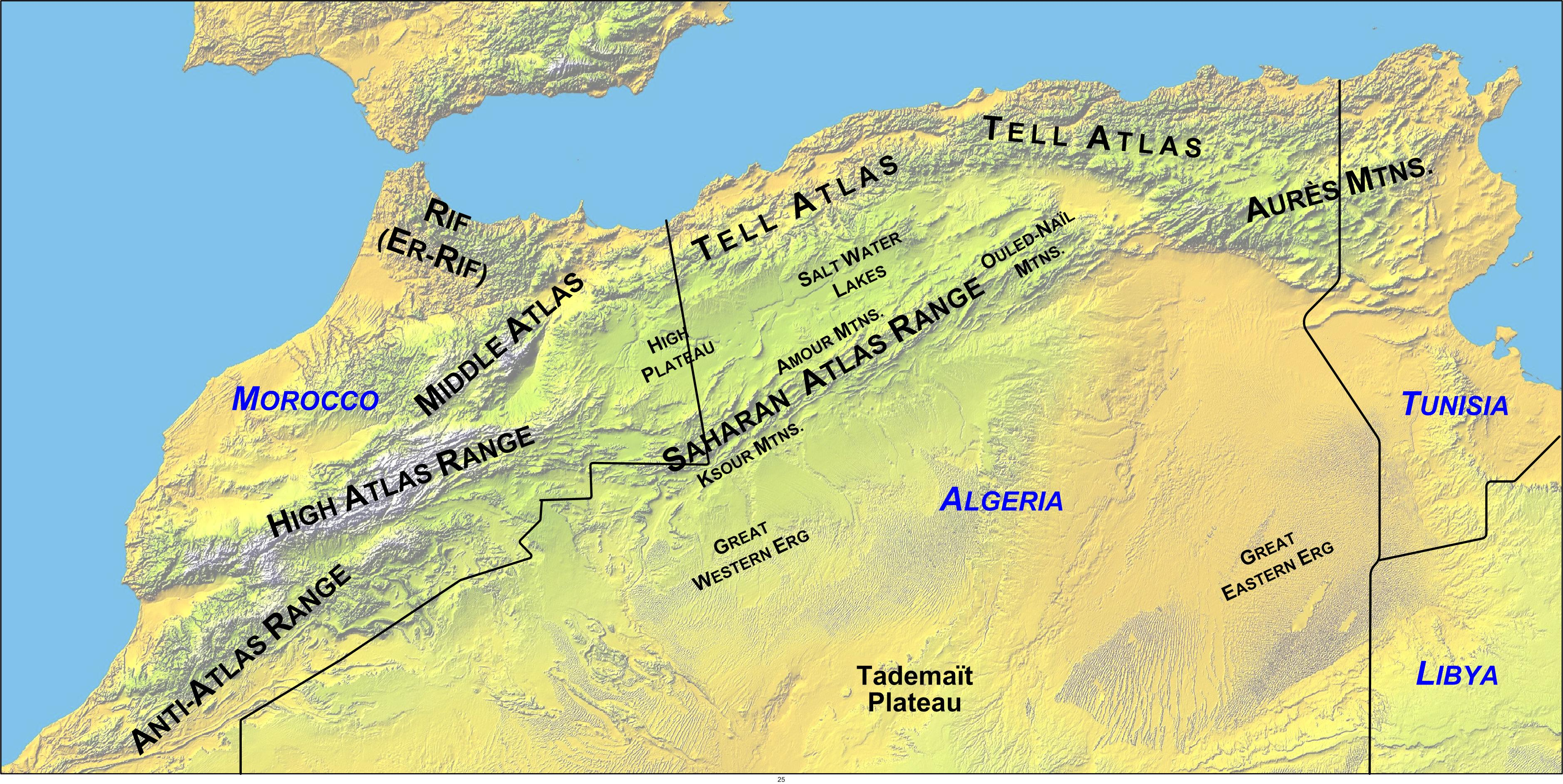
A map showing the location of the Atlas Mountains across North Africa

The basement rock of most of Africa was formed during the Precambrian supereon and is much older than the Atlas Mountains lying on the continent. The Atlas was formed during three subsequent phases of Earth's geology.

The first tectonic deformation phase involves only the Anti-Atlas, which was formed in the Paleozoic Era (~300 million years ago) as the result of continental collisions. North America, Europe and Africa were connected millions of years ago.

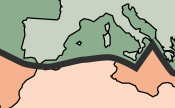
The tectonic boundary

The Anti-Atlas Mountains are believed to have originally been formed as part of the Alleghenian orogeny. These mountains were formed when Africa and America collided and were once a chain rivaling today's Himalayas. Today, the remains of this chain can be seen in the Fall Line region in the Eastern United States. Some remnants can also be found in the later formed Appalachians in North America.

A second phase took place during the Mesozoic Era (before ~66 My). It consisted of a widespread extension of the Earth's crust that rifted and separated the continents mentioned above. This extension was responsible for the formation of many thick intracontinental sedimentary basins including the present Atlas. Most of the rocks forming the surface of the present High Atlas were deposited under the ocean at that time.

In the Paleogene and Neogene Periods (~66 million to ~1.8 million years ago), the mountain chains that today constitute the Atlas were uplifted, as the land masses of Europe and Africa collided at the southern end of the Iberian Peninsula. Such convergent tectonic boundaries occur where two plates slide towards each other forming a subduction zone (if one plate moves underneath the other), and/or a continental collision (when the two plates contain continental crust). In the case of the Africa-Europe collision, it is clear that tectonic convergence is partially responsible for the formation of the High Atlas, as well as for the closure of the Strait of Gibraltar and the formation of the Alps and the Pyrenees.

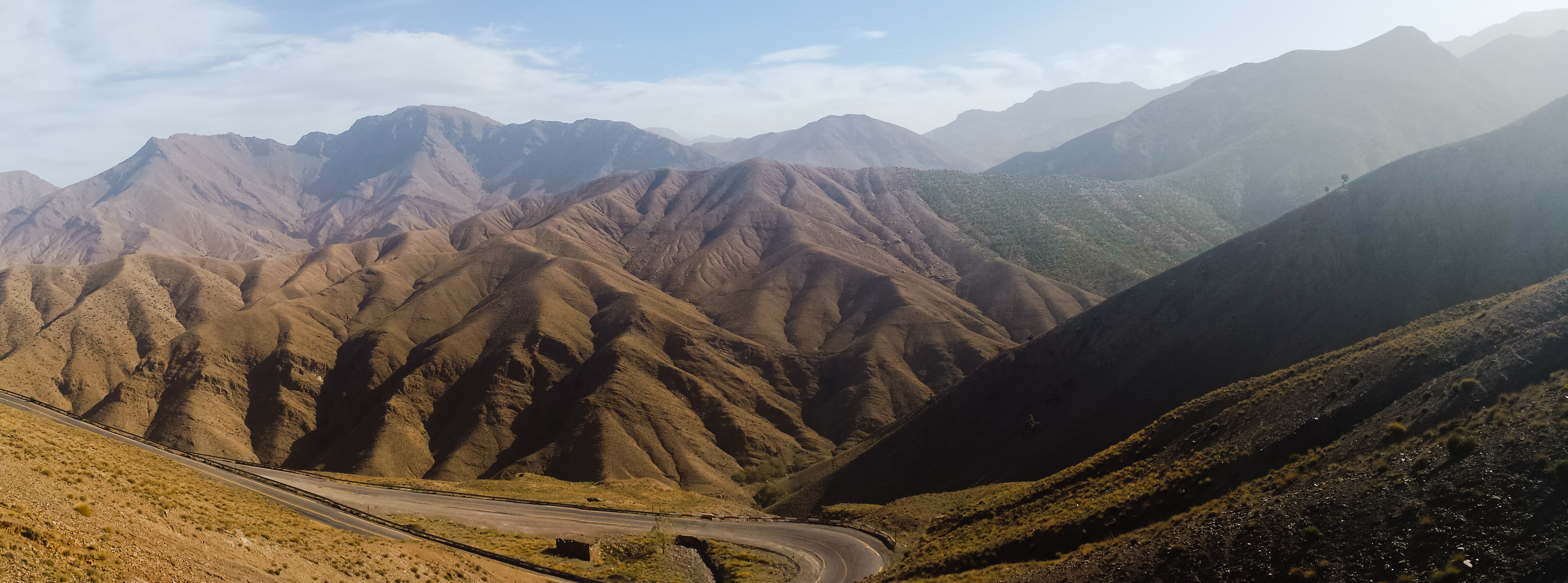
View of the mountains

However, there is a lack of evidence for the nature of the subduction in the Atlas region, or for the thickening of the Earth's crust generally associated with continental collisions. One of the most striking features of the Atlas to geologists is the relatively small amount of crustal thickening and tectonic shortening despite the important altitude of the mountain range. Recent studies suggest that deep processes rooted in the Earth's mantle may have contributed to the uplift of the High and Middle Atlas.

=== Natural resources ===
The Atlas are rich in natural resources. There are deposits of iron ore, lead ore, copper, silver, mercury, rock salt, phosphate, marble, anthracite coal and natural gas among other resources.

== Subranges ==
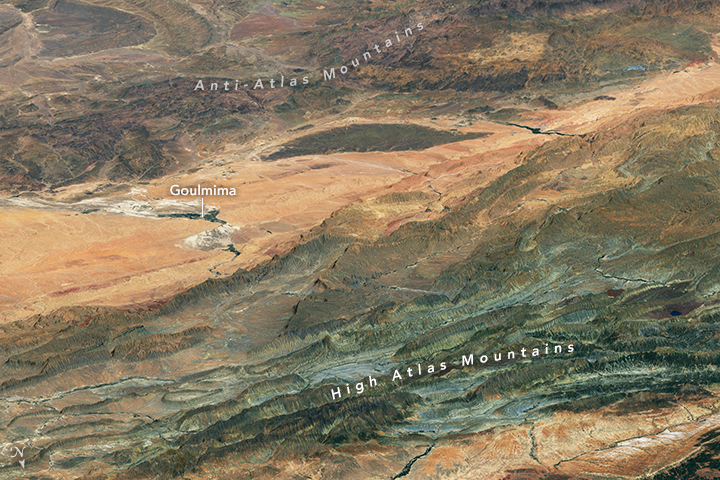
Satellite photograph of the High Atlas and Anti-Atlas Mountains (Saghro). North is at the bottom; the city of Goulmima can be seen at center left.

The range can be divided into four general regions:

- Anti-Atlas, High Atlas and Middle Atlas (Morocco)
- Tell Atlas (Morocco, Algeria, Tunisia)
- Aurès Mountains (Algeria, Tunisia)
- Saharan Atlas (Algeria)

=== Anti-Atlas ===
The Anti-Atlas extends from the Atlantic Ocean in the southwest of Morocco toward the northeast to the heights of Ouarzazate and further east to the city of Tafilalt (altogether a distance of approximately 500 kilometres or 300 miles). In the south it borders the Sahara. The easternmost point of the anti-Atlas is the Saghro range and its northern boundary is flanked by sections of the High Atlas range. It includes the Djebel Siroua, a massif of volcanic origin with the highest summit of the range at 3,304 m. The Jebel Bani is a much lower range running along the southern side of the Anti Atlas.

=== High Atlas ===
High Atlas, Morocco

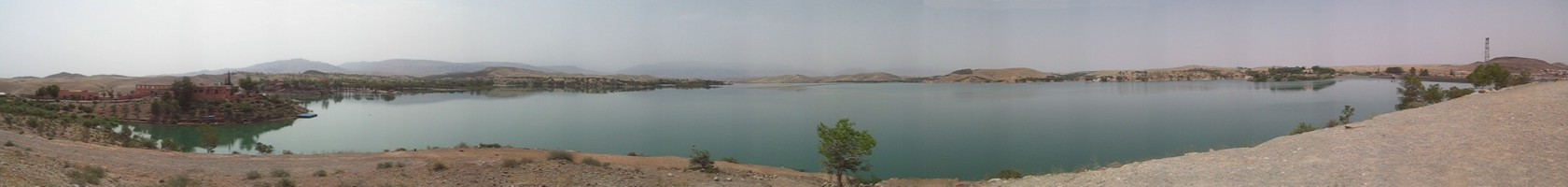
A panoramic picture of the artificial lake of Lalla Takerkoust near Barrage Cavagnac, with the hydroelectric dam (far right)

A panoramic view of typical Berber village in the High Atlas

The High Atlas in central Morocco rises in the west at the Atlantic coast and stretches in an eastern direction to the Moroccan-Algerian border.

It has several peaks over 4,000 m (13,000 ft), including the highest summit in North Africa, Toubkal (4,167 m or 13,671 ft), and further east Ighil m'Goun (4,071 m or 13,356 ft), the second major summit of the range. At the Atlantic and to the southwest, the range drops abruptly and makes a transition to the coast and the Anti-Atlas range. To the north, in the direction of Marrakesh, the range descends less abruptly. On the heights of Ouarzazate the massif is cut through by the Draa Valley which opens southward.

It is mainly inhabited by Berber people, who live in small villages and cultivate the high plateaus and valleys. one such population is Near Barrage Cavagnac where there is a hydroelectric dam that has created the artificial lake Lalla Takerkoust. The lake serves also as a source for fish for the local fishermen.

The largest villages and towns of the area are Ait Ourir, Ourika, Ghmate, Tighedouine, Ouarzazate, Tinghir, Boumalne Dades, Kalaat M'Gouna, Azilal, Demnate and Imintanoute.

The Western High Atlas mountains drop abruptly into the Atlantic Ocean, meeting the sea along the rugged coastline of the Ihahan tribal territory, and creating a small peninsula at the village of Tamri north of Agadir.

The Eastern High Atlas is a drier plateau region in central-eastern Morocco that stretches from Midelt Province towards the Algerian border and the Saharan transition zone at Figuig Province. In the rainy season, water and ice buildup from the Eastern high atlas flows either north into the Moulouya River, or south feeding into the Ziz, Ghris and Guir rivers, which irrigate the Tafilalt and Bechar regions.

=== Middle Atlas ===
White covers the Middle Atlas Mountains in northern Morocco

The Middle Atlas is completely in Morocco and is the northernmost of its three main Atlas ranges. The range lies north of the High Atlas, separated by the Moulouya and Oum Er-Rbia rivers, and south of the Rif mountains, separated by the Sebou River. To the west are the main coastal plains of Morocco with many of the major cities and, to the east, the high barren plateau that lies between the Saharan and Tell Atlas. The high point of the range is the jbel Bou Naceur (3340 m). The Middle Atlas experiences more rain than the ranges to the south, making it an important water catchment for the coastal plains and important for biodiversity. It is home to the majority of the world's population of Barbary macaque.

=== Saharan Atlas ===
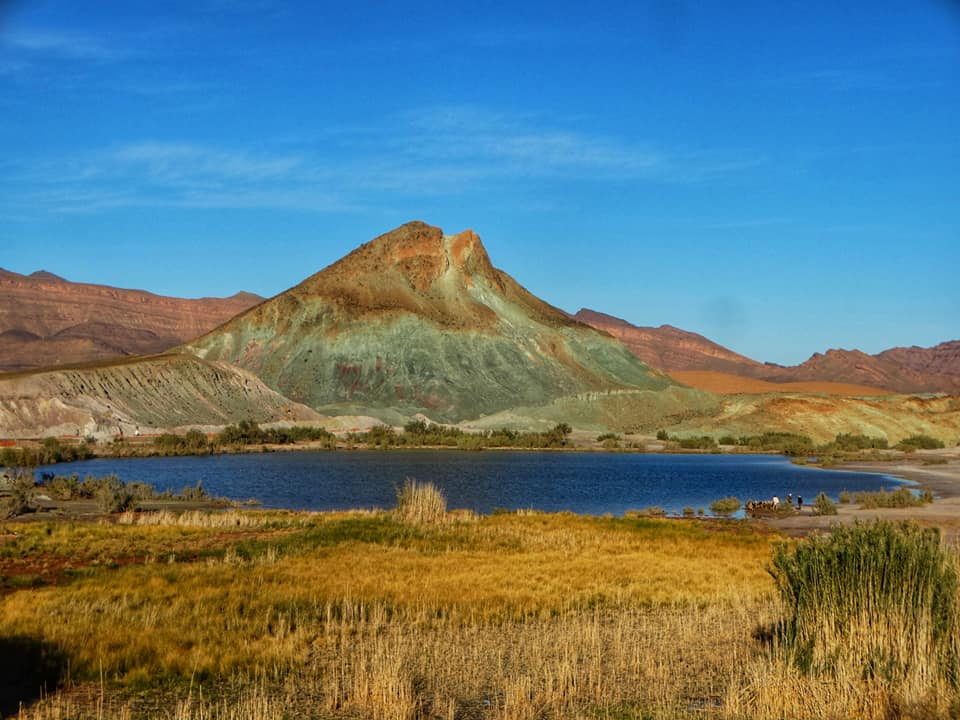
Mineral sources at Amour Range in Naâma Province

The Saharan Atlas of Algeria runs east of the High Atlas, crossing Algeria from the Moroccan border and into Tunisia. The Aures Mountains are often presented as being the easternmost part of the Saharan Atlas. Though not as high as the High Atlas, they reach similar altitudes as the Tell Atlas range that runs to the north of them and closer to the coast. The highest peak in the range, outside of the Aures Mountains, is the 2,236 m (7,336 ft) high Djebel Aissa. They mark the northern edge of the Sahara Desert. The mountains see some rainfall and are better suited to agriculture than the plateau region to the north. Today, most of the population of the region are Berbers (Imazighen).

=== Tell Atlas ===
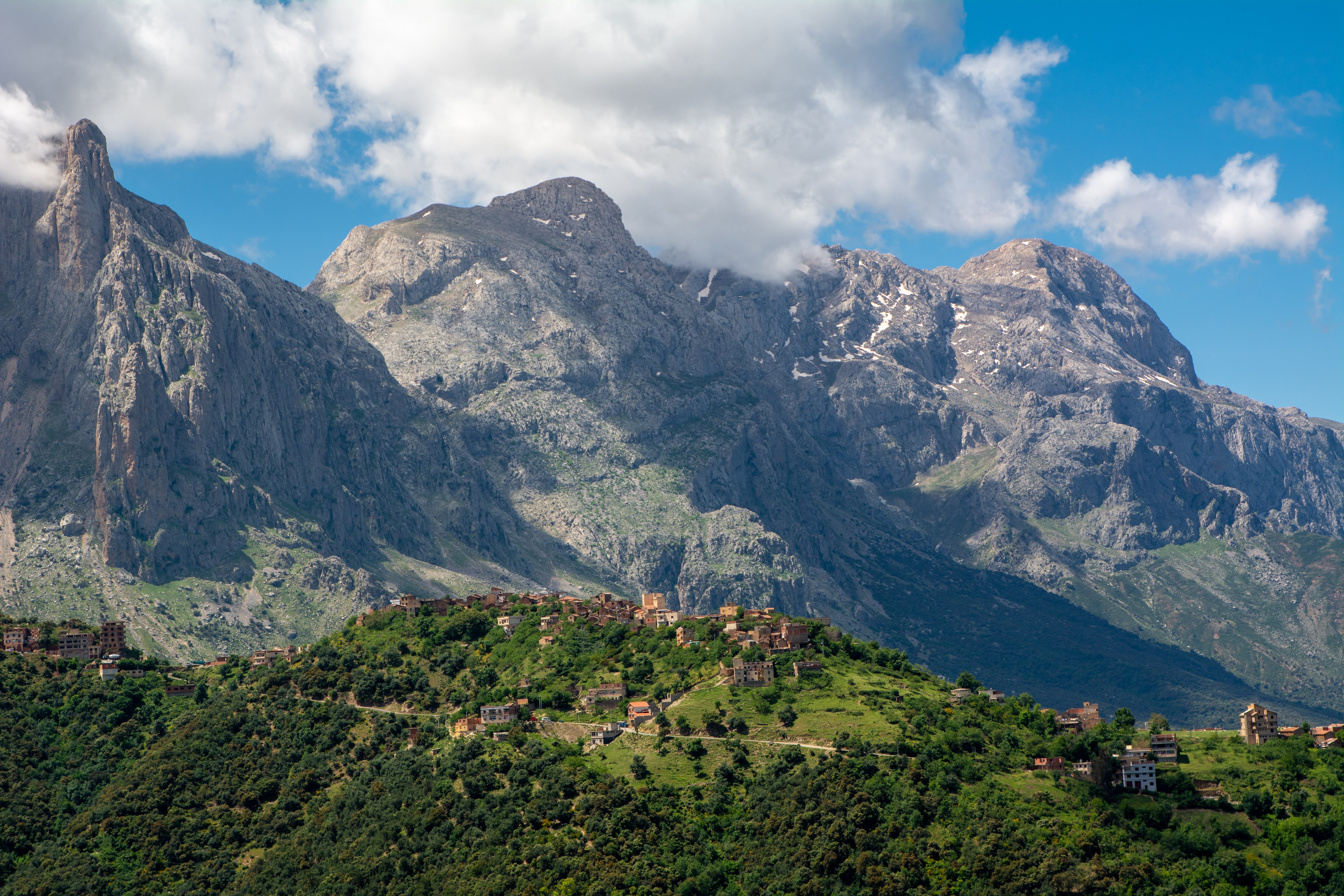
Northern slopes of Djebel Akouker (2,184 m or 7,165 ft) in the Djurdjura range (Tell Atlas, Algeria)

The Tell Atlas is a mountain chain over 1,500 kilometres (900 mi) in length, belonging to the Atlas mountain ranges and stretching from Eastern Morocco to Tunisia, and through Algeria. It parallels the Mediterranean coast and joins with the Saharan Atlas in Eastern Algeria and Tunisia. The highest summit of the Tell Atlas is the 2,308 m (7,572 ft) Lalla Khadidja in the Djurdjura range of Kabylia. The western end of the Tell Atlas merges with the Middle Atlas range in Morocco.

The area immediately to the south of the Tell Atlas is the high plateau of the Hautes Plaines, with lakes in the wet season and salt flats in the dry. The eastern half of the Tell Atlas has the most humid climate of North Africa, with annual precipitation reaching well above 1,000 mm (39 in), and sometimes over 1,500 mm (59 in) like in the Collo Peninsula or near Ain Draham. An important amount of snow falls on the summits in winter.

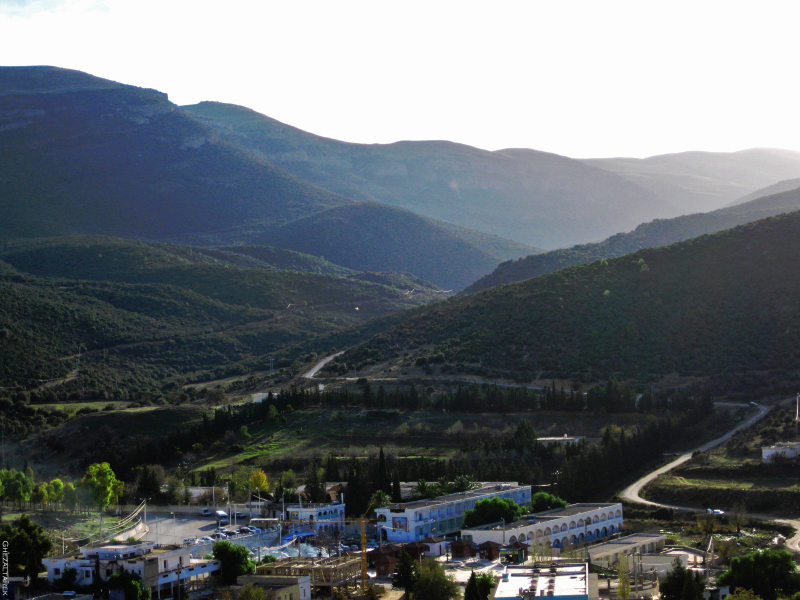
Aures Mountains

=== Aurès ===
The Aurès Mountains are the easternmost portion of the Atlas mountain range. It covers parts of Algeria and Tunisia. The Aurès natural region is named after the range.

== Flora and fauna ==
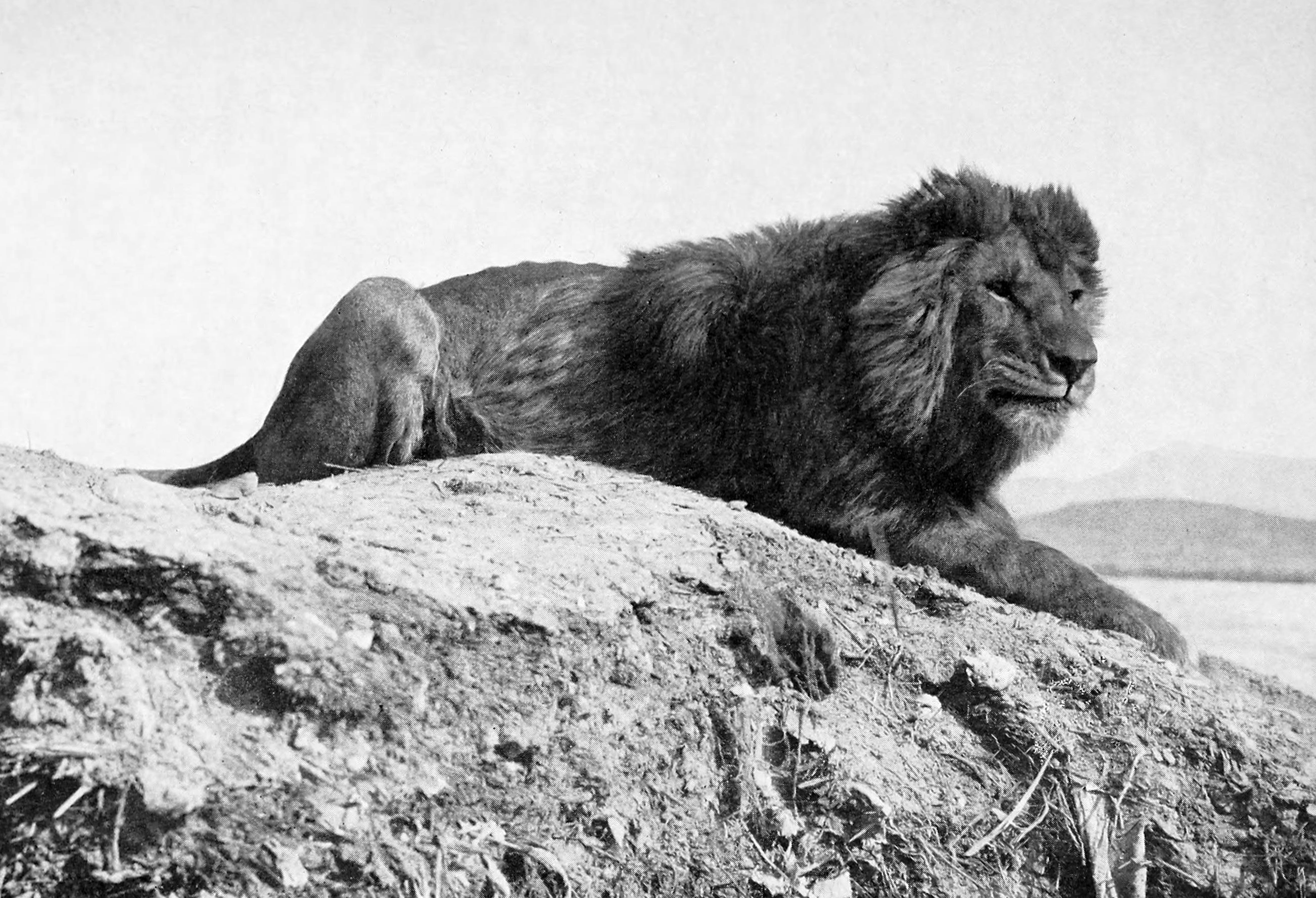
A male Barbary lion photographed in Algeria by Alfred Edward Pease in 1893.

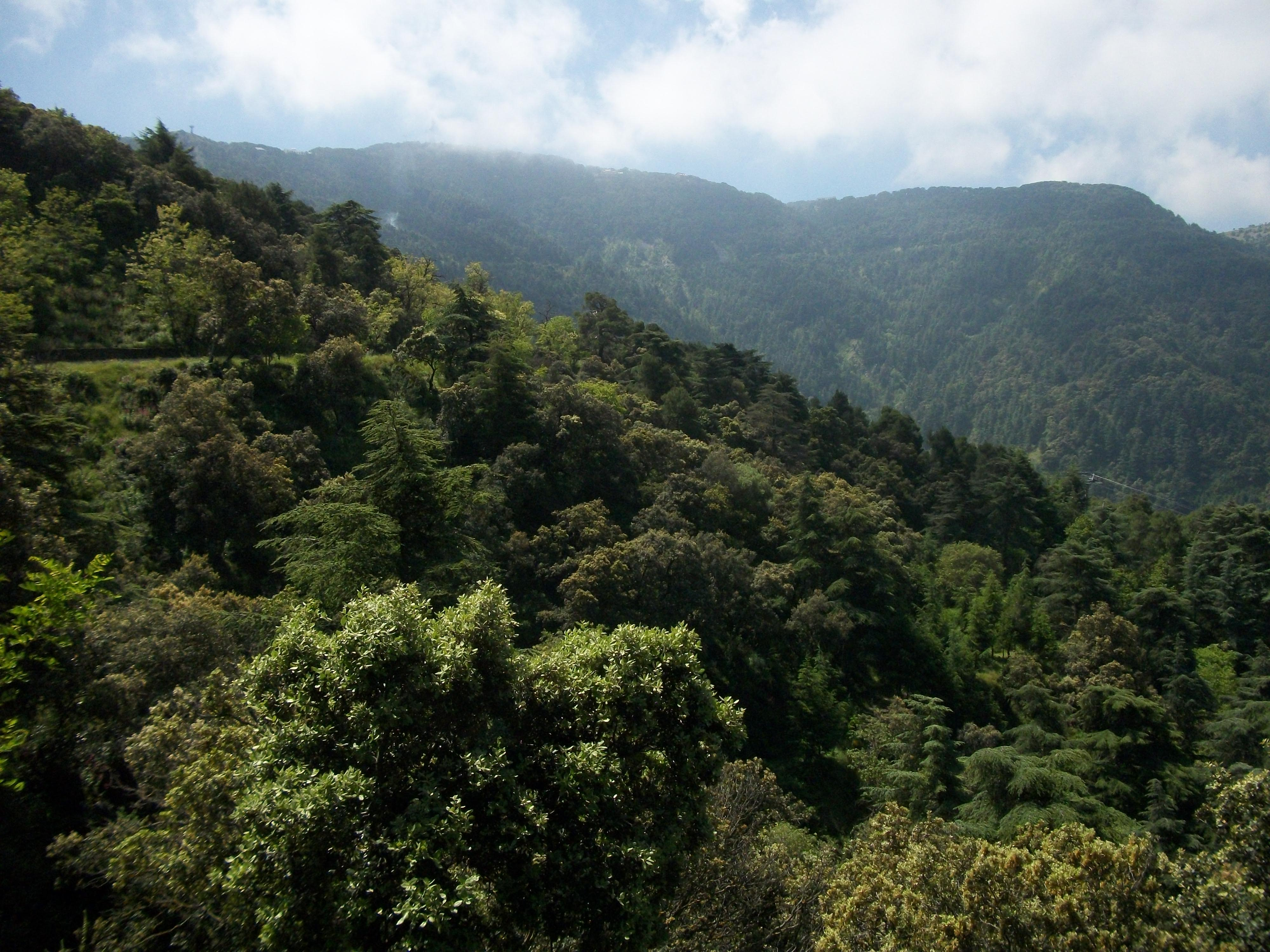
Mixed forest (Atlas cedar, oaks, ash trees) in the Blidean Atlas (a part of the Tell Atlas), South of Algiers.

The Atlas poppy derives its name and origin from the Atlas Mountains in Morocco.

Flora in the mountains include the Atlas cedar, evergreen oak and many semi-evergreen oaks such as the Algerian oak. In areas that receive more rainfall, like the Kabylie range, cork oaks, arbutus (cane apple), heather shrub, rockroses and lavender can be found.

Animals that live in the area include the Barbary macaque (misnamed as the Barbary ape), Barbary leopard, Barbary stag, Barbary sheep, Atlas Mountain badger, Cuvier's gazelle, North African boar, striped hyena, red fox, northern bald ibis, Algerian nuthatch, dipper, and Atlas mountain viper.

Many animals used to inhabit the Atlas mountains such as the Atlas bear, North African elephant, North African aurochs, bubal hartebeest and Atlas wild ass, but these subspecies are all extinct. Barbary lions are currently extinct in the wild, but descendants exist in captivity.

== See also ==
- Atlas (mythology)
- Capsian culture
- Nafusa Mountains
- Teffedest Mountains
- Djurdjura Mountains
- Rif
- Bouzareah Mountain
