= Sidi Daoud (disambiguation) =

Sidi Daoud is a town and commune in Algeria.

It may also refer to:

- Zawiyet Sidi Daoud, a Sufi zawiya in Algeria.
  - Sidi Daoud massacre
- Sidi Daoud, Tunisia
- Ait Sidi Daoud, Morocco
