= Ait Faska =

- Rural commune and town
- Location within Morocco
- Coordinates: 31°30′21″N 7°42′58″W
- Country: Morocco
- Region: Marrakech-Tensift-Al Haouz
- Province: Al Haouz Province

Population (2004)
  - Total: 19,239
- Time zone: UTC+0 (GMT)

Ait Faska is a small town and rural commune in Al Haouz Province of the Marrakech-Tensift-Al Haouz region of Morocco. At the time of the 2004 census, the commune had a total population of 19239 people living in 3327 households.
