= Tahannaout =

Tahannaout تحناوت ⵜⴰⵃⵏⵏⴰⵡⵜ
- Town
- Interactive map of Tahannaout
- Coordinates: 31°21′5″N 7°57′3″W
- Country: Morocco
- Region: Marrakesh-Safi
- Province: Al Haouz Province

Population (2004)
  - Total: 6,585
- Time zone: UTC+0 (GMT)

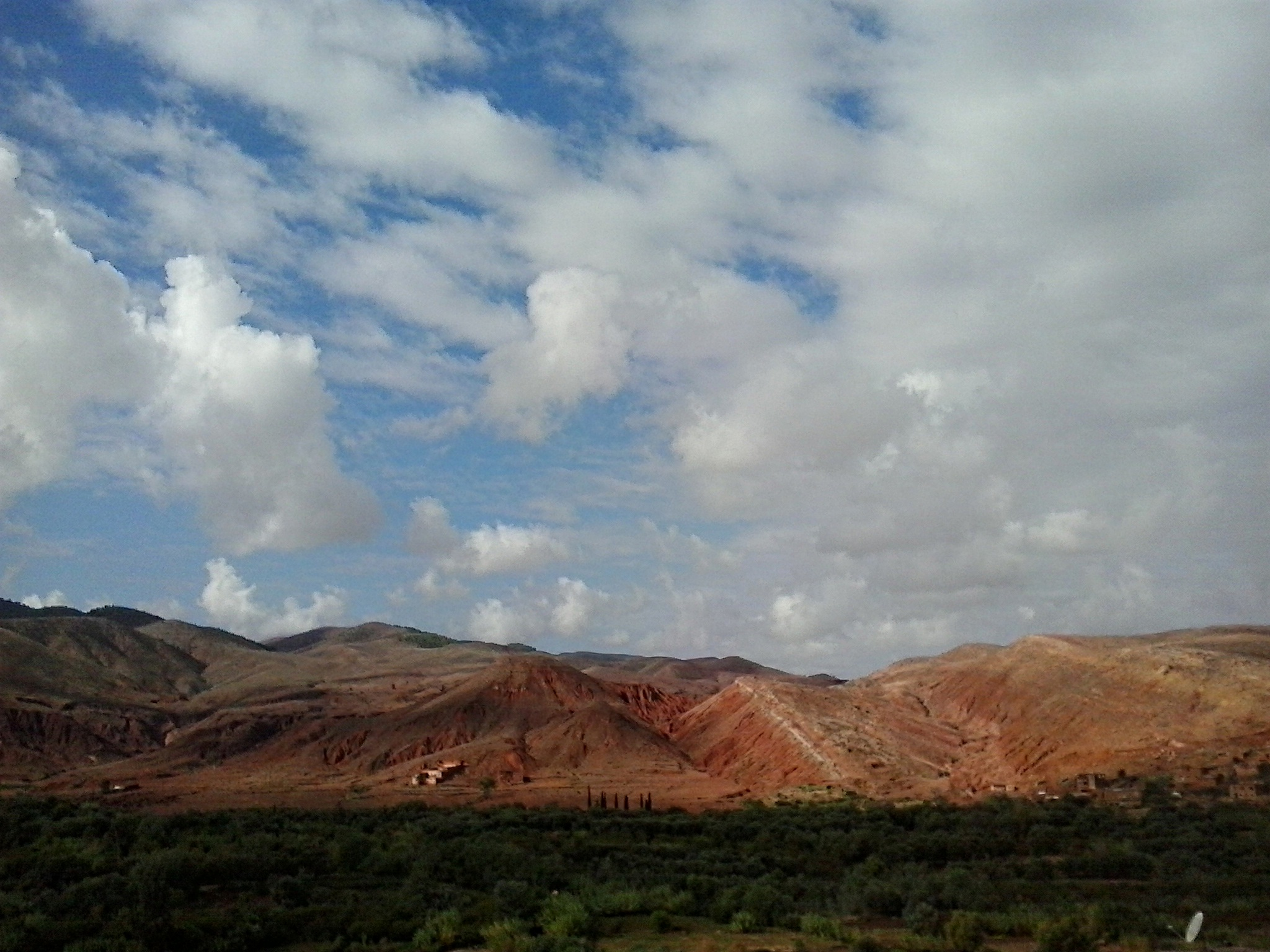

Tahannaout or Tahnaout is a town and commune, capital of Al Haouz Province of the Marrakesh-Safi region of Morocco. It is located 34.5 kilometres (21.4 mi) by road south of Marrakesh, near the foot of the Atlas Mountains. It contains a Jewish cemetery.
