= Azgour =

- Rural commune and town
- Location within Morocco
- Coordinates: 31°21′N 7°30′W
- Country: Morocco
- Region: Marrakesh-Tensift-El Haouz
- Province: Al Haouz Province

Population (2004)
  - Total: 6,314
- Time zone: UTC+0 (GMT)

Azgour is a small town and rural commune in Al Haouz Province of the Marrakesh-Tensift-El Haouz region of Morocco. At the time of the 2004 census, the commune had a total population of 6314 people living in 1187 households.
