= Imgdal =

- Rural commune and town
- Location within Morocco
- Coordinates: 31°06′42″N 8°08′00″W
- Country: Morocco
- Region: Marrakesh-Tensift-El Haouz
- Province: Al Haouz Province

Population (2004)
  - Total: 5,537
- Time zone: UTC+0 (GMT)

Imgdal is a small town and rural commune in Al Haouz Province of the Marrakesh-Tensift-El Haouz region of Morocco. At the time of the 2004 census, the commune had a total population of 5537 people living in 1044 households.
