= Abadou =

- Rural commune and town
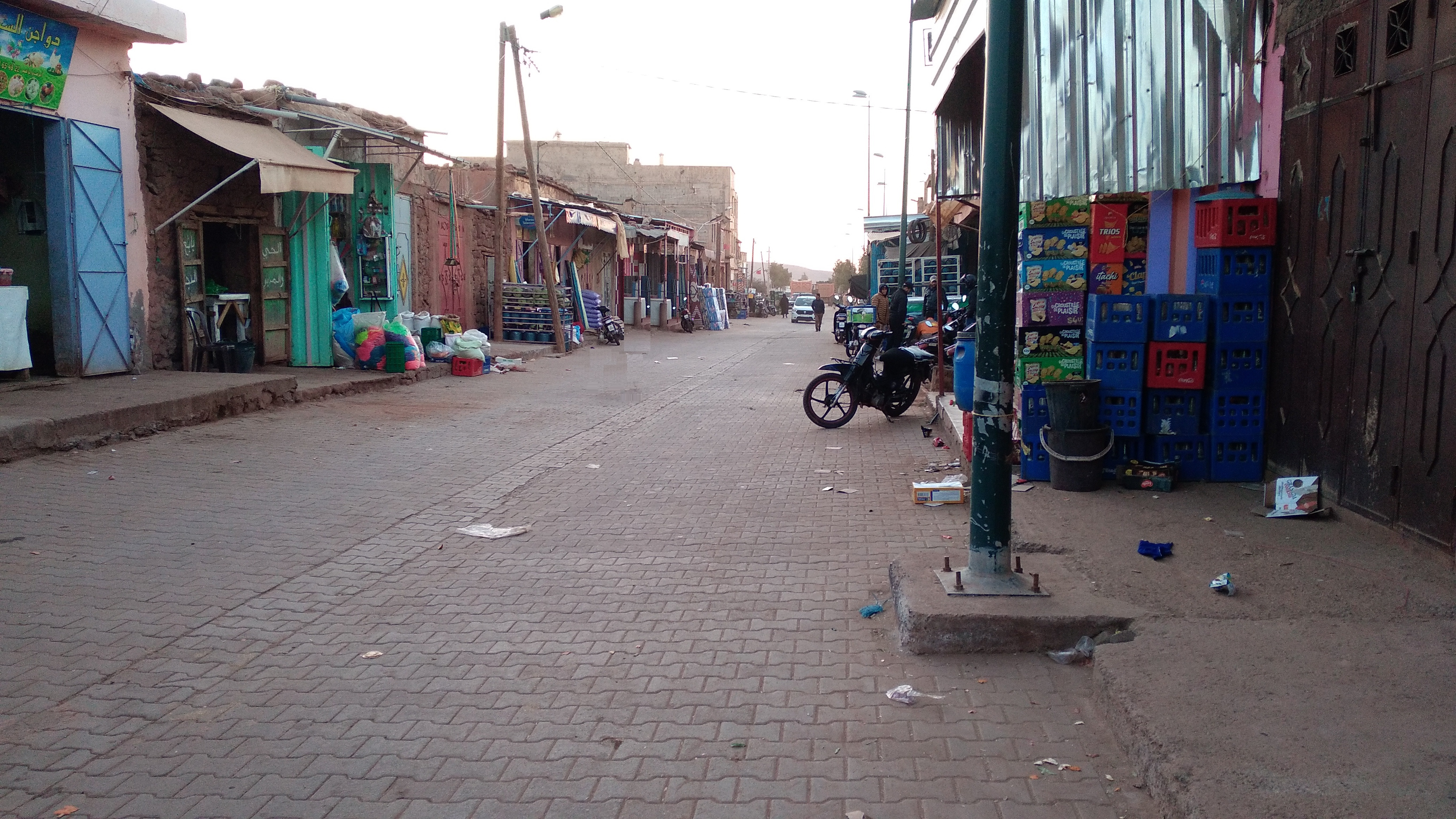
- The town of Abadou

- Location within Morocco
- Coordinates: 31°34′47″N 7°18′44″W
- Country: Morocco
- Region: Marrakech-Tensift-Al Haouz
- Province: Al Haouz Province

Population (2004)
  - Total: 9,905
- Time zone: UTC+0 (GMT)

Abadou is a small town and rural commune in Al Haouz Province of the Marrakech-Tensift-Al Haouz region of Morocco. At the time of the 2004 census, the commune had a total population of 9905 people living in 1490 households.
