= Ait Hkim Ait Yzid =

- Rural commune and town
- Location within Morocco
- Coordinates: 31°29′10″N 7°12′14″W
- Country: Morocco
- Region: Marrakech-Tensift-Al Haouz
- Province: Al Haouz Province

Population (2004)
  - Total: 8,112
- Time zone: UTC+0 (GMT)

Ait Hkim Ait Yzid is a small town and rural commune in Al Haouz Province of the Marrakech-Tensift-Al Haouz region of Morocco. At the time of the 2004 census, the commune had a total population of 8112 people living in 1027 households.
