= Tameslouht =

Tameslouht ⵜⴰⵎⵚⵍⵓⵃⵜ تمصلوحت
- rural commune
- Kasbah (Igherm) of Tameslouht
- Interactive map of Tameslouht
- Coordinates: 31°30′N 8°6′W
- Country: Morocco
- Region: Marrakesh-Safi
- Province: Al Haouz

Population (2004)
  - Total: 6,346
- Time zone: UTC+0 (GMT)

Tameslouht (Moroccan Arabic: تمصلوحت; Standard Moroccan Tamazight: ⵜⴰⵎⵚⵍⵓⵃⵜ, romanized: tamṣluḥt) is a village and rural commune in Al Haouz Province, Morocco. It is situated 17 kilometers from Marrakesh. It is known for its history as a Sufi religious center and its zawiya. It is cited as the place of origin of tangia, a stew that is a staple of Marrakeshi cuisine.
