= Tizguine =

- Rural commune and town
- Interactive map of Tizguine
- Coordinates: 31°14′43″N 8°19′06″W
- Country: Morocco
- Region: Marrakesh-Tensift-El Haouz
- Province: Al Haouz Province

Population (2004)
  - Total: 3,889
- Time zone: UTC+0 (GMT)

Tizguine is a small town and rural commune in Al Haouz Province of the Marrakesh-Tensift-El Haouz region of Morocco. At the time of the 2004 census, the commune had a total population of 3889 people living in 812 households.
