= Zerkten =

Coordinates: 31°27′N 7°24′W

- Rural commune and town
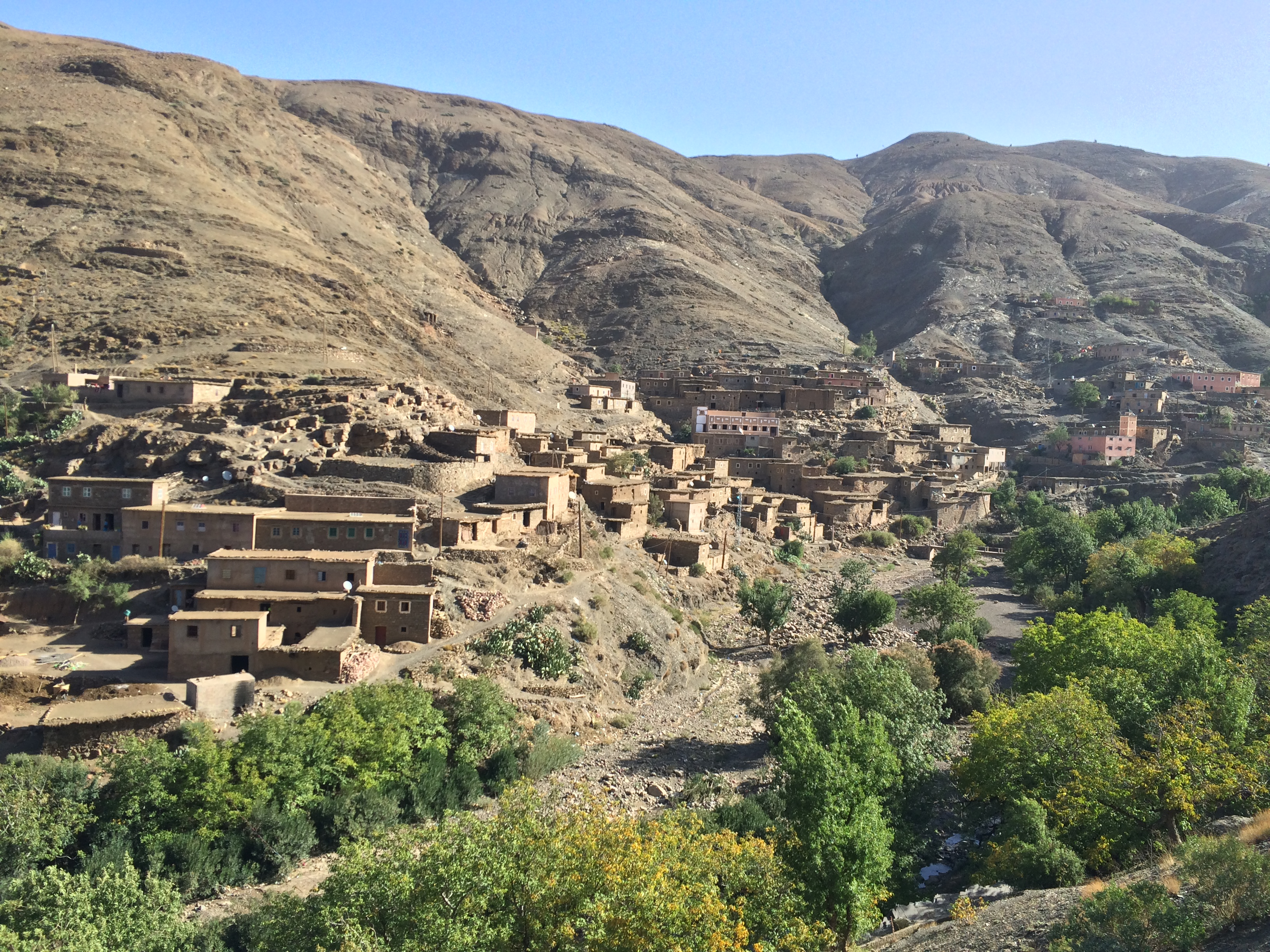
- Ait Ben Ammar, Zerkten, Morocco
- Interactive map of Zerkten
- Country: Morocco
- Region: Marrakesh-Tensift-El Haouz
- Province: Al Haouz Province

Population (2004)
  - Total: 19,154
- Time zone: UTC+0 (GMT)

Zerkten is a small town and rural commune in Al Haouz Province of the Marrakesh-Tensift-El Haouz region of Morocco. At the time of the 2004 census, the commune had a total population of 19154 people living in 2826 households.
