= Sidi Badhaj =

- Rural commune and town
- Location within Morocco
- Coordinates: 31°38′36″N 7°28′17″W
- Country: Morocco
- Region: Marrakesh-Tensift-El Haouz
- Province: Al Haouz Province

Population (2004)
  - Total: 6,540
- Time zone: UTC+0 (GMT)

Sidi Badhaj or Sidi Rahhal is a small town and rural commune in Al Haouz Province of the Marrakesh-Tensift-El Haouz region of Morocco. At the time of the 2004 census, the commune had a total population of 6540 people living in 1253 households.
