= Amghras =

Coordinates: 31.2100°N 8.1834°W

- Rural commune and town
- Interactive map of Amghras
- Country: Morocco
- Region: Marrakesh-Tensift-El Haouz
- Province: Al Haouz Province

Population (2004)
  - Total: 4,222
- Time zone: UTC+0 (GMT)

Amghras is a small town and rural commune in Al Haouz Province of the Marrakesh-Tensift-El Haouz region of Morocco. At the time of the 2004 census, the commune had a total population of 4222 people living in 760 households.
