= Tamaguert =

- Rural commune and town
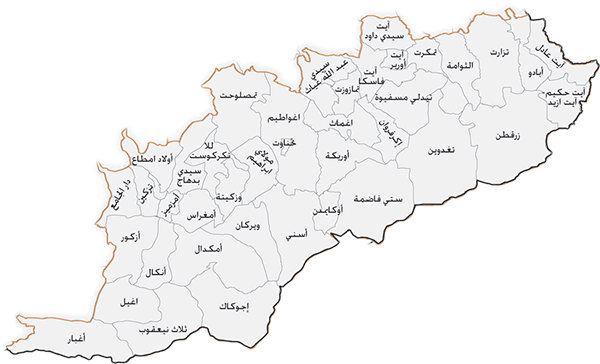
- Interactive map of Tamaguert
- Country: Morocco
- Region: Marrakech-Tensift-Al Haouz
- Province: Al Haouz Province

Population (2004)
  - Total: 10,325
- Time zone: UTC+0 (GMT)

Tamaguert is a small town and rural commune in Al Haouz Province of the Marrakech-Tensift-Al Haouz region of Morocco. At the time of the 2004 census, the commune had a total population of 10325 people living in 1805 households.
