= Iguerferouane =

- Rural commune and town
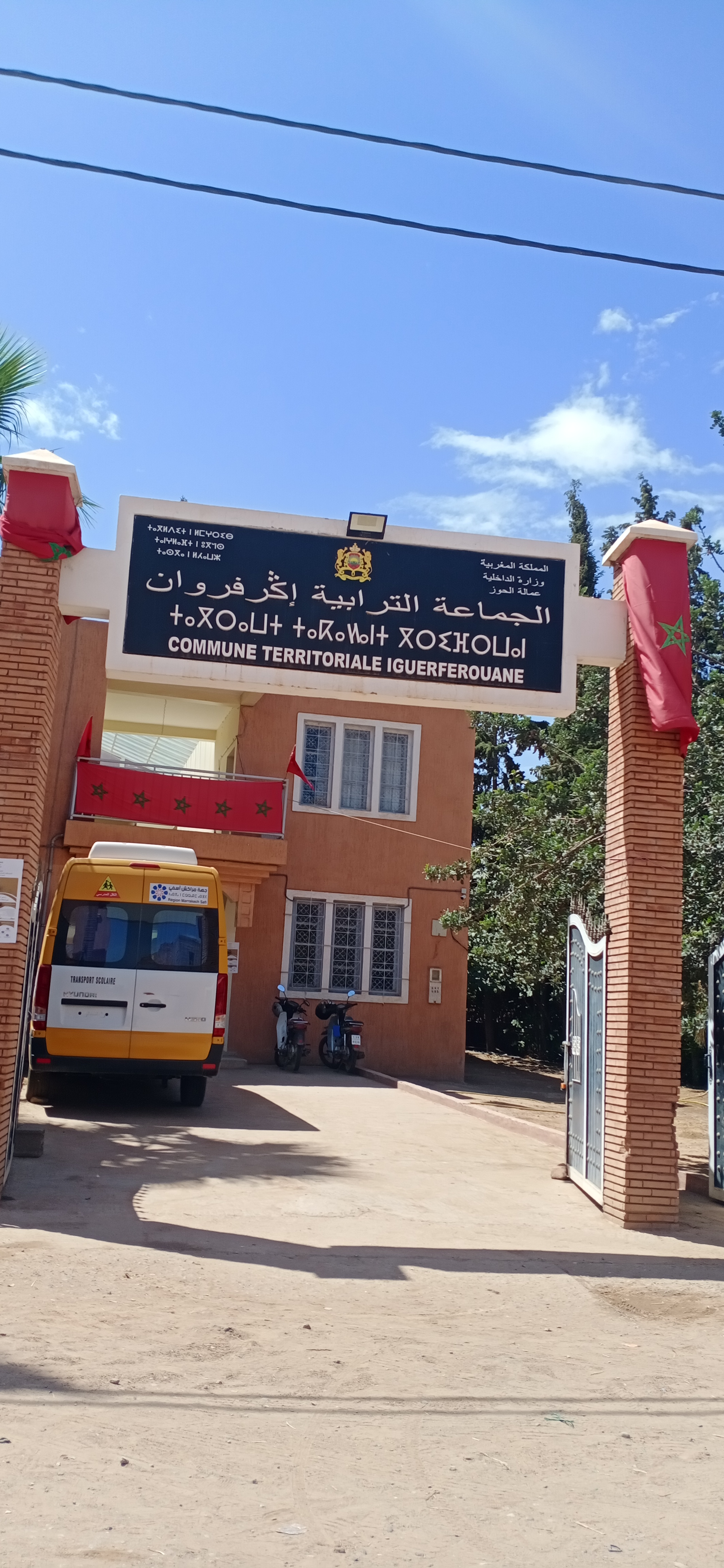

- Location within Morocco
- Coordinates: 31°25′5″N 7°41′8″W
- Country: Morocco
- Region: Marrakech-Tensift-Al Haouz
- Province: Al Haouz Province

Population (2004)
  - Total: 12,454
- Time zone: UTC+0 (GMT)

Iguerferouane is a small town and rural commune in Al Haouz Province of the Marrakech-Tensift-Al Haouz region of Morocco. At the time of the 2004 census, the commune had a total population of 12454 people living in 1804 households.
