= Palmeraie (Marrakesh) =

Palm oasis near Marrakesh, Morocco

Palmeraie (palm grove) is a palm oasis of several hundred thousand trees outside of Marrakesh, Morocco. Situated at the edge of the city's northern section, it measures 5 miles (8.0 km) in length, and covers an area of 54 square miles (140 km^{2}). It is known for its eponymous palm trees and resorts, as well as the Palmeraie Rotana Resort, and Nikki Beach. It is approached on the Circuit de la Palmeraie, which branches off from the N8 highway to Fez.

== History ==
Although legend mentions that this Palmeraie was created from date seeds cast off centuries ago by Arab warriors, it was created during the Almoravid period, using a khettara network.

The ancient tale (more than 1000 years old) refers to this garden of palm trees as "the ardent children of the African earth and sun". Sultan Yusuf ibn Tashfin, while searching for land to establish his Almoravid dynasty had camped at the plain of Haouz. His soldiers, who had camped there, after consuming palm-dates had thrown the date seeds around and some of them had dropped into holes created by the lances which they had pitched there, and these sprouted into trees. Many centuries later the same plain had become an oasis of a lush garden of 50,000 trees. Here, Stuart Church, an American architect and designer, and Jaoud Kadiri created their dream project of building an edifice of oriental culture and Buddhist philosophy, which they called the Dar Alhind, which is a mansion which permeates the spirit and traditions of India.

Now there are over 100,000 date palms, as well as olive and fruit trees. In the present day, nearby reservoirs and artesian wells supply the irrigation.

In the town planning norms of the 1920s, buildings were not allowed be built to heights taller than the palm trees and as a result palm trees have grown in pavements also. However, in recent years urbanization has affected the area.

== Bibliography ==
- French, Carole (2011). National Geographic Traveler Morocco. National Geographic. ISBN 978-1-4262-0706-8.
- Honnor, Julius (2012). Morocco Footprint Handbook. Footprint Travel Guides. ISBN 978-1-907263-31-6.
- Listri, Massimo; Rey, Daniel (2005). Marrakech: Living on the Edge of the Desert. Images Publishing. ISBN 978-1-86470-152-4.
- Portillo, Miguel J. (1994). Marrakech y sus alrededores (in Spanish). Editorial Kairós. ISBN 978-84-7245-269-5.
- Sales, Ros (2007). Time Out Marrakech: Essaouira & the High Atlas. Time Out Guides. ISBN 978-1-84670-019-4.
- Sullivan, Paul (2006). A Hedonist's Guide to Marrakech. A Hedonist's guide to... ISBN 978-1-905428-06-9.
