= Sti Fadma =

Coordinates: 31.2256°N 7.6758°W

Setti Fadma
- Rural commune and town
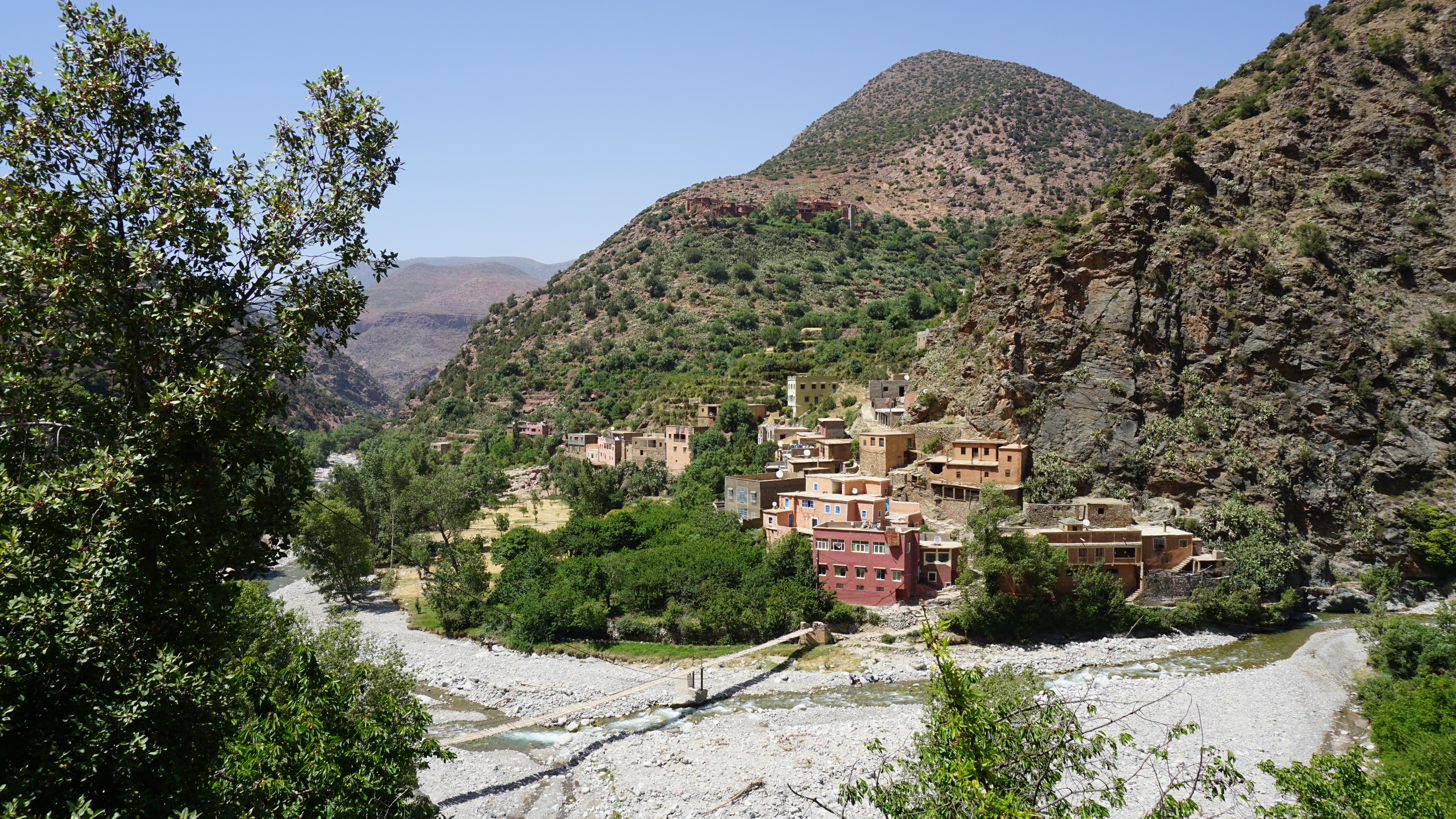
- Interactive map of Setti Fadma
- Country: Morocco
- Region: Marrakesh-Tensift-El Haouz
- Province: Al Haouz Province

Population (2004)
  - Total: 22,283
- Time zone: UTC+0 (GMT)

Setti Fadma is a small town and rural commune in Al Haouz Province of the Marrakesh-Tensift-El Haouz region of Morocco. At the time of the 2004 census, the commune had a total population of 22,283 living in 3,503 households.
