= Bab er Robb =

Moroccan cultural heritage site

Coordinates: 31.6172°N 7.9906°W

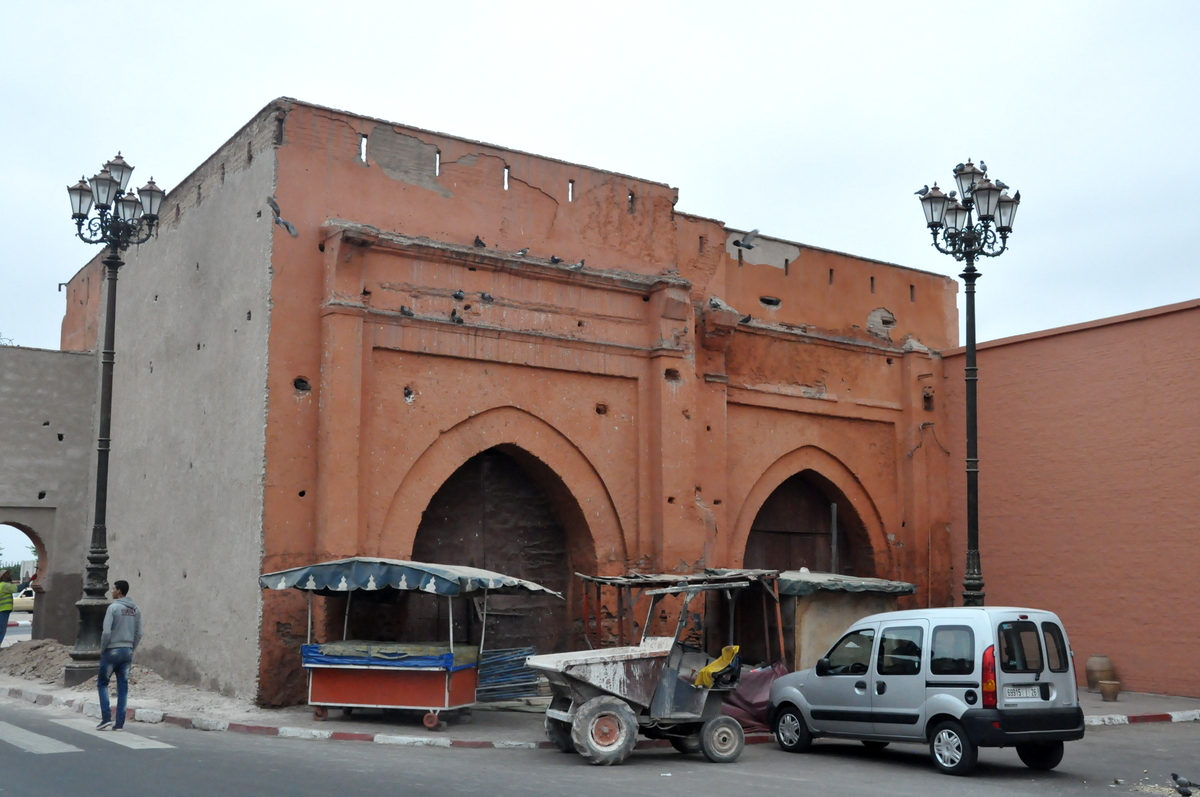
The historic Bab er-Robb gate

Bab er Robb (Arabic: باب الرب) is a southern city gate in the historic medina of Marrakesh, Morocco.

== Location ==
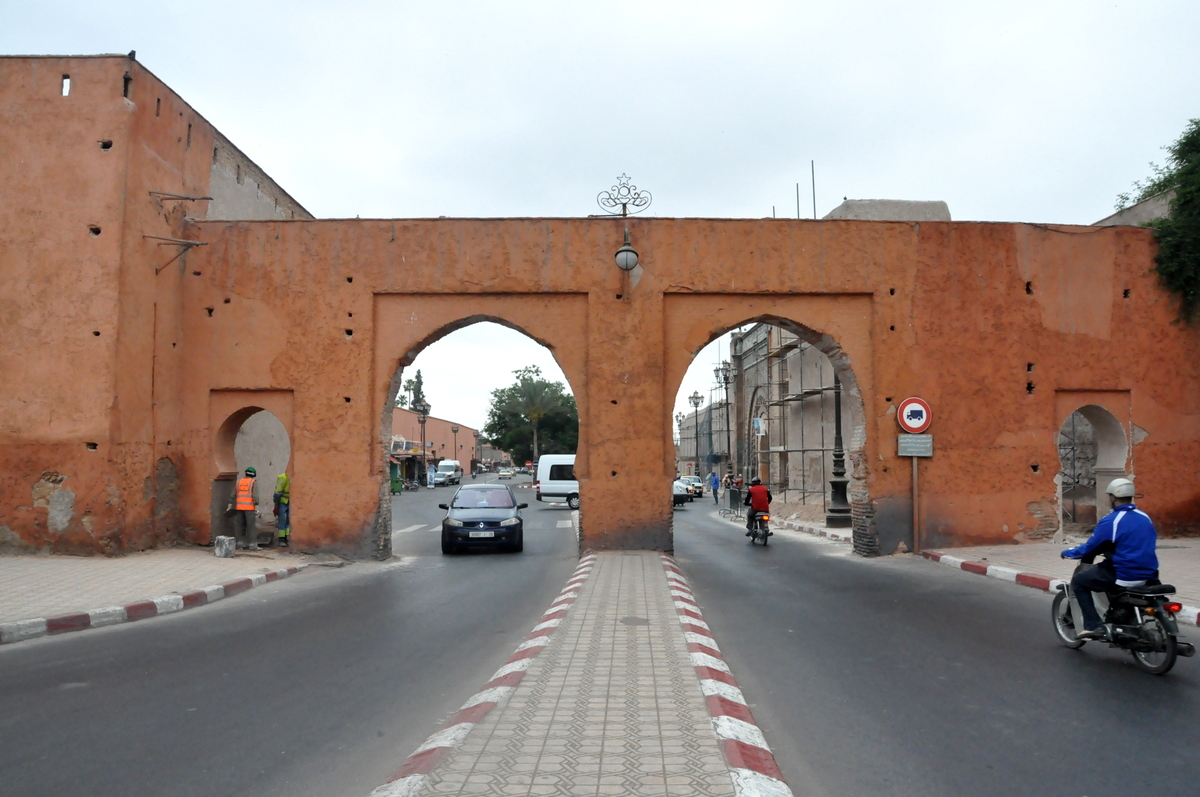
The road which passes next to Bab er-Robb today

The gate is located near Bab Agnaou and the Kasbah district. It leads to the roads that lead to the mountain towns of Amizmiz and Asni.

== Historical background ==
While some historians believe the gate to be of Almohad origin (specifically under Ya'qub al-Mansur) due to its location relative to the Almohad Kasbah, architect and specialist of Moroccan architecture Quentin Wilbaux more recently argued that its location in the wider schema of the city suggests it was an original Almoravid gate. Both of them believe that Bab Neffis, another gate described in historical sources and named after the nearby Neffis (or N'fis) River, was most likely another name for the same gate. The word Robb or Rubb refers to a type of cooked wine whose vineyards were cultivated along the Neffis River and thus imported and regulated through this gate. A water basin measuring approximately 70 by 40 metres once existed outside this gate, in an area now covered by a cemetery, and was used for swimming practice.

== Architectural design ==
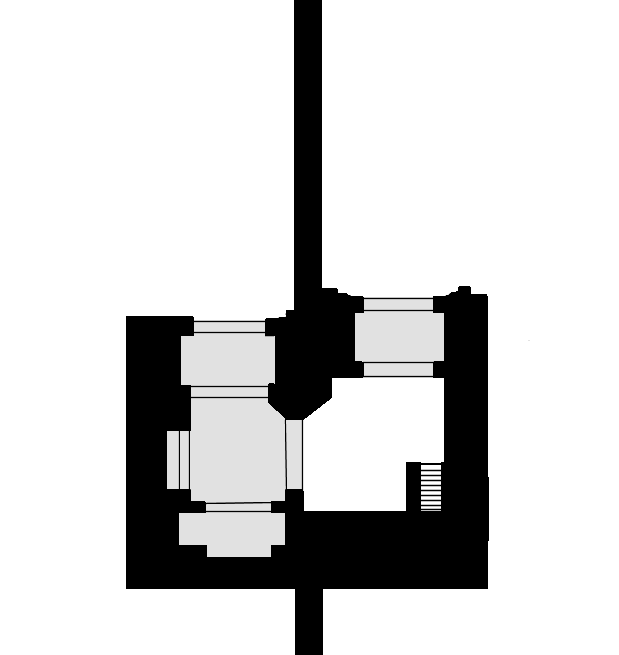
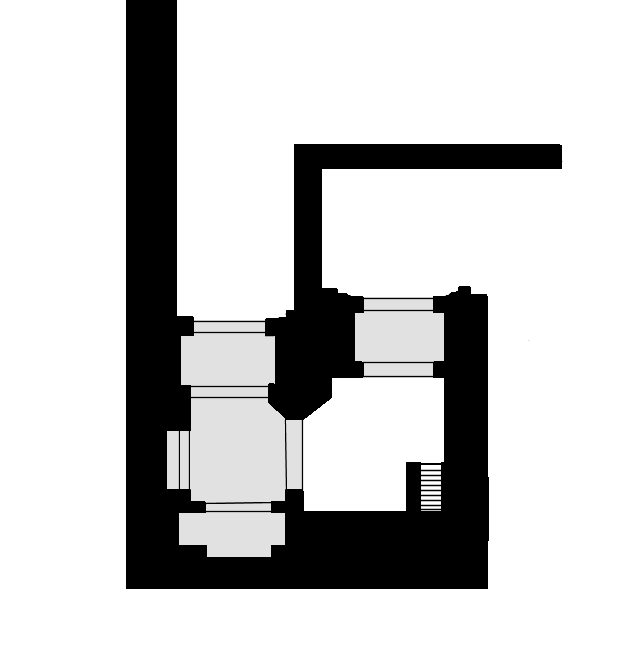
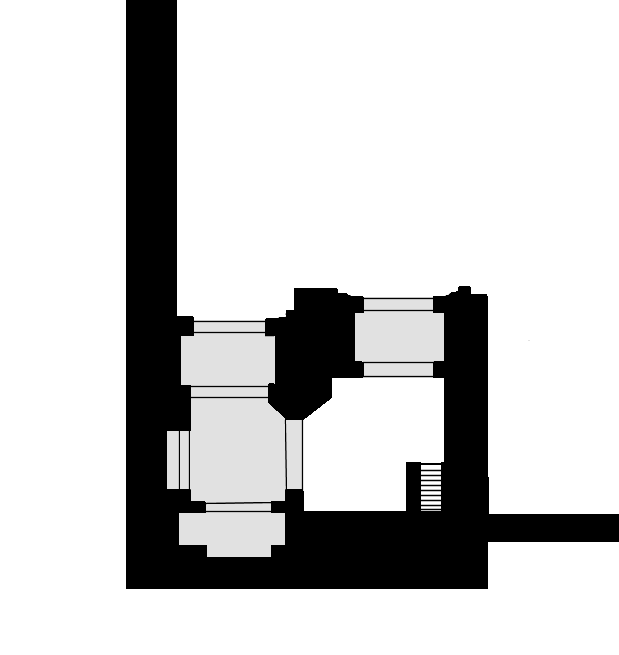
Floor plan of Bab er-Robb over time. From left to right: 1) the hypothesized original configuration of the gate (the right side was inside the city, the left side was outside); 2) the configuration of the gate at the beginning of the 20th century; and 3) the configuration of the (now defunct) gate today.

Bab er-Robb is one of the most unusual gates in the city, and the only one to be located in an angle or corner of the walls. The main structure of the gate is a bastion inside which a bent passage enters from the north, performs a 180-degree turn, and then exits again to the north.

Today, the walls in the area have been moved around the gate's bastion such that both entrances of the gate, which face north, open inside the city walls. This obscures its original role as a passage in and out of the city. However, when the gate was studied by French scholars in 1912 the city wall had a different configuration: rather than attaching to the side of the gatehouse it attached to the middle of the gate's northern facade, between its two doorways, such that the left or eastern doorway was outside the city wall while the right or western one was inside the walls. Since both entrances still faced north, this meant that the outer entrance faced away from the countryside and towards the city walls; as a result, travelers coming from the south, outside the city, had to walk all the way around to the other side of the bastion in order to enter it from the north. Because of this uncharacteristic configuration, and based on comparisons with other gates of the city, Wilbaux has hypothesized that the city's ramparts in this area were altered and moved around the gate such that the entrances were reversed: the eastern doorway, which was the outer entrance in 1912, was originally located inside the city walls, while the western doorway (the inner entrance in 1912) was originally outside the city walls. This way, the bastion of the gate straddled the city wall and its design was equivalent to the original configuration of Bab Aghmat, the other southern gate of the city.
