= Tidili Mesfioua =

Coordinates: 31°28′N 7°37′W

- Rural commune and town
- Interactive map of Tidili Mesfioua
- Country: Morocco
- Region: Marrakech-Tensift-Al Haouz
- Province: Al Haouz Province

Population (2004)
  - Total: 21,106
- Time zone: UTC+0 (GMT)

Terraced fields near Tidili Mesfioua

Tidili Mesfioua is a small town and rural commune in Al Haouz Province of the Marrakech-Tensift-Al Haouz region of Morocco. At the time of the 2004 census, the commune had a total population of 21106 people living in 3449 households.
