= Jebel Yagour =

Mountain in Morocco

Jebel Yagour جبل ياكور
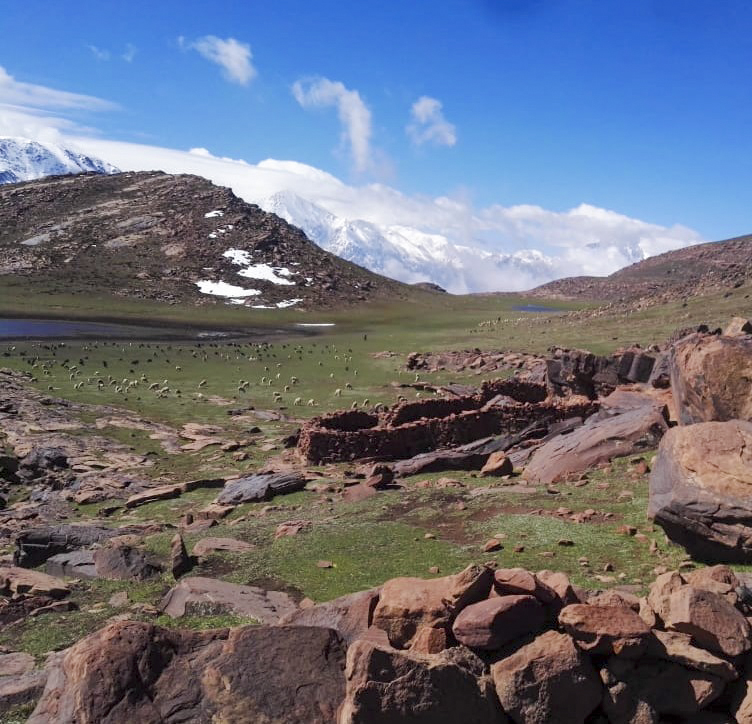
- Agdal Nizam at Yagour plateau, 2023,

Highest point
- Elevation: 2,700 m (8,900 ft)
- Coordinates: 31°19′N 07°39′W

Geography
- Location within Morocco
- Location: Al Haouz Province, Marrakesh-Safi, Morocco
- Parent range: High Atlas

Climbing
- First ascent: Unknown
- Easiest route: From Marrakesh

Jebel Yagour (Tachelhit: Adrar N Yagour) is a mountain in the High Atlas range of Morocco, located to the south of Marrakesh. It is a 2300 - 2700 m high plateau surrounded by massive escarpments.

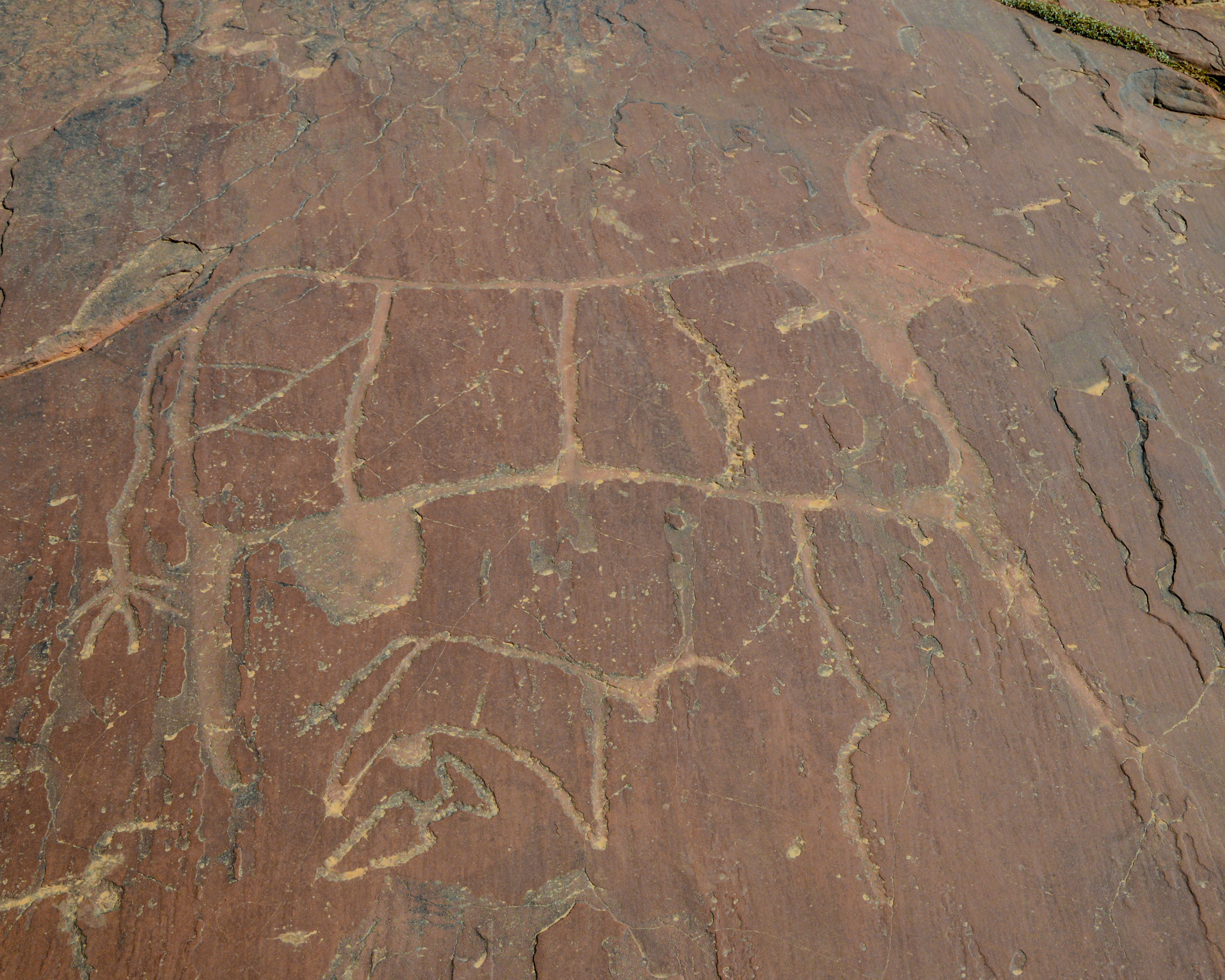
Rock art in Jebel Yagour

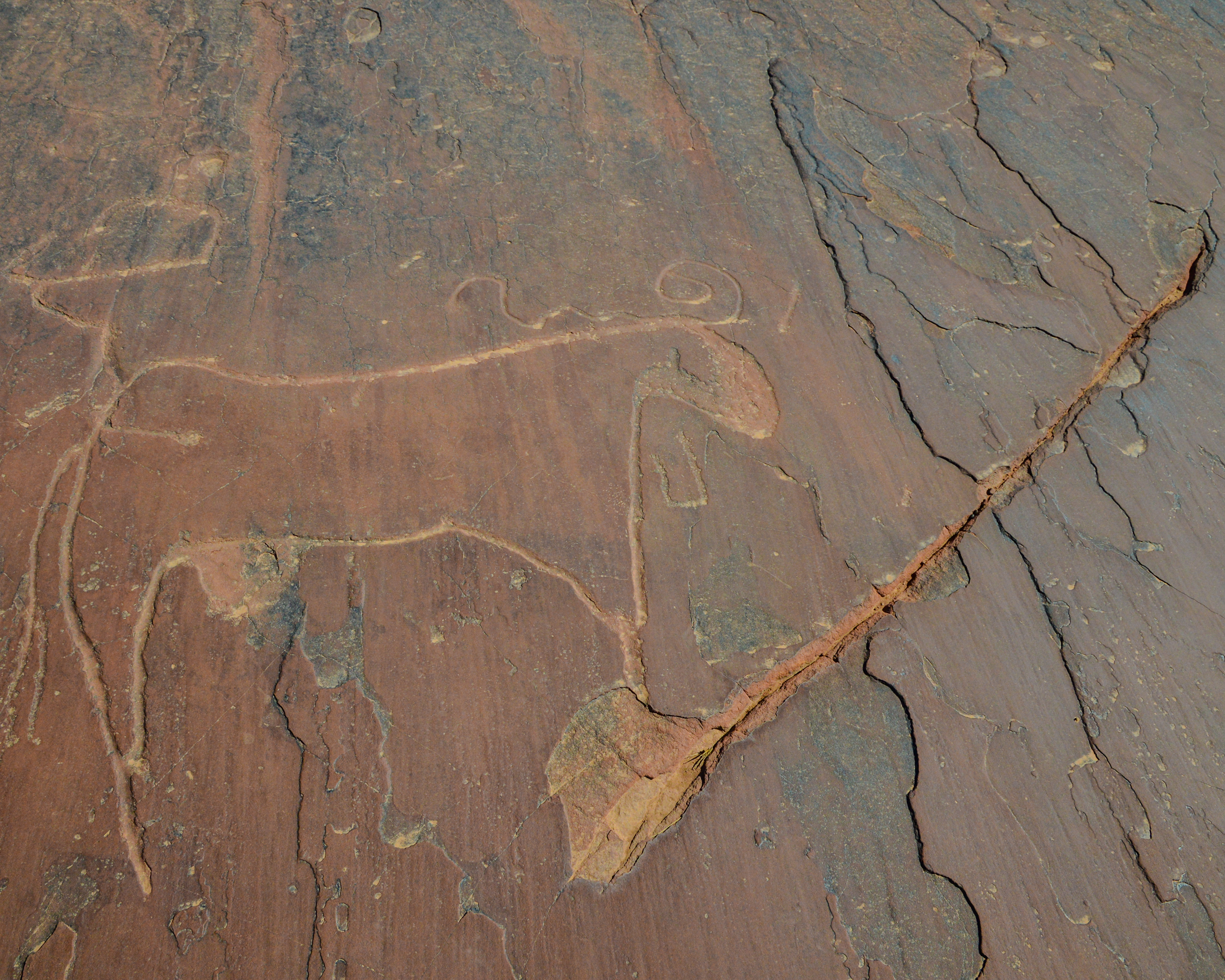
Rock art in Jebel Yagour

The mountain is noted for its rock art and for its panoramic views of the Atlas range. There are over a thousand engraved images on the rocks dating back to 500 - 1000 BC.

== Archaeological site of Jebel Yagour ==
The archaeological site of the Yagour Plateau extends over an area of 4,000 hectares, in the province of Al Haouz, and includes a large number of archaeological inscriptions of more than 2,000 inscriptions, the most famous of which is the archaeological inscription known as the "sun panel". Experts point out that these inscriptions date back to about 1500 BC, and document the migrations of pastoral tribes towards mountainous areas due to climatic fluctuations and the availability of minerals in this region that were used during the Bronze Age. Among the symbols documented in this area are drawings of people during the practice of hunting, as well as drawings of various wild animals such as the elephant and rhinos, as well as drawings of some tools such as daggers, swords and spears, and some inscriptions in Amazigh letters Tifinagh. Prehistoric cemeteries are also presumed to exist in the area. This site was registered as a national heritage of Morocco in order to protect it from vandalism and to qualify it as a tourist attraction in the region.

In 2012, a group of Moroccan Salafists destroyed an inscription from the archaeological site of the Yagour plateau, known as "the panel of the sun", believing it to be an incarnation of the sun god.

== Pastoral system ==
The Yagour Plateau is subject to the Agdal pastoral system, where shepherds are forbidden to exploit the area at the beginning of spring, until the community decides to do so after pasture flourishes in the pastures, so all neighbouring tribes flock to the area to benefit from their share of grazing, and horses and other animals are left free in the area throughout the Agdal grazing period.

== Population ==
The Yagour Plateau is surrounded by a group of villages, all of which are Amazigh. The official language of the region is Berber language or Tamazight.
