= Anougal =

Coordinates: 31°09′51″N 8°15′24″W

- Rural commune and town
- Interactive map of Anougal
- Country: Morocco
- Region: Marrakesh-Tensift-El Haouz
- Province: Al Haouz Province

Population (2004)
  - Total: 4,173
- Time zone: UTC+0 (GMT)

Anougal is a small town and rural commune in Al Haouz Province of the Marrakesh-Tensift-El Haouz region of Morocco. At the time of the 2004 census, the commune had a total population of 4173 people living in 750 households.
