= Sidi Abdallah Ghiat =

- Town
- Location in Morocco
- Coordinates: 31.522°N 7.852°W
- Country: Morocco
- Region: Marrakesh-Safi
- Province: Al Haouz

Population (2004)
  - Total: 986
- Time zone: UTC+0 (GMT)

Sidi Abdallah Ghiat is a town in Al Haouz Province, Marrakesh-Safi, Morocco. According to the 2004 census it has a population of 986.
