= Tazart =

- Rural commune and town
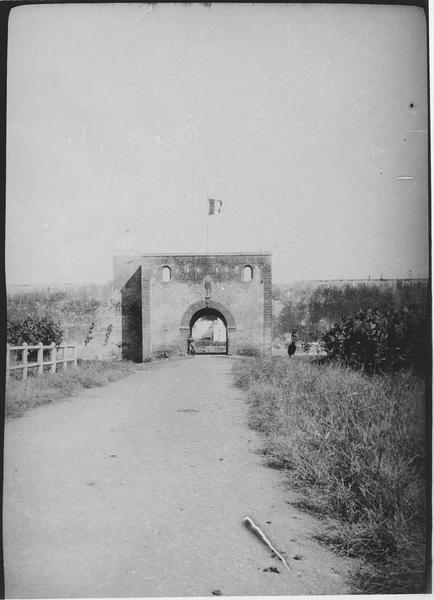

- Location within Morocco
- Coordinates: 31°39′35″N 7°24′33″W
- Country: Morocco
- Region: Marrakech-Tensift-Al Haouz
- Province: Al Haouz Province

Population (2004)
  - Total: 14,583
- Time zone: UTC+0 (GMT)

Tazart is a small town and rural commune in Al Haouz Province of the Marrakech-Tensift-Al Haouz region of Morocco. At the time of the 2004 census, the commune had a total population of 14,583 people living in 2,292 households.
