= Ait Ourir =

Ait Ourir أيت أورير ⴰⵢⵜ ⵓⵡⵔⵉⵔ
- Municipality and City
- Interactive map of Ait Ourir
- Coordinates: 31°33′52″N 7°39′46″W
- Country: Morocco
- Region: Marrakesh-Safi
- Province: Al Haouz

Government
  - Mayor: Ahmed Touizi (PAM)
- Elevation: 675 m (2,215 ft)

Population (2024)
  - Total: 56,954
- Time zone: UTC+0 (GMT)

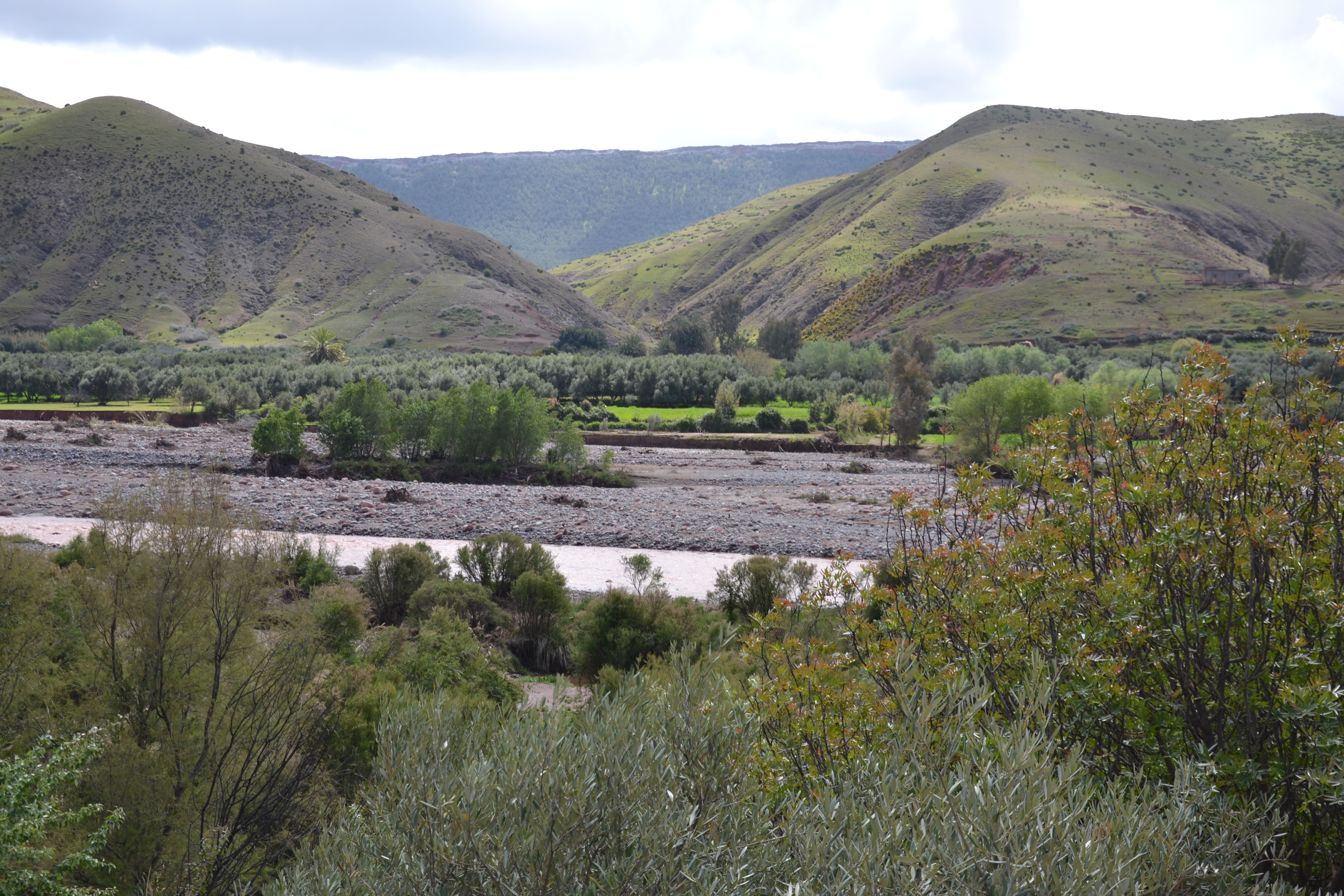
Landscape of Ait Ourir

Ait Ourir is a city and municipality in Al Haouz Province, Marrakesh-Safi, Morocco. At the time of the 2024 Moroccan census, the commune had a total population of 56,954 people living in 13,312 households.

The city lies on the northern bank of the Zat river, 29.8 kilometres (18.5 mi) by road to the northwest of Tighedouine and 33.3 kilometres (20.7 mi) east of the city centre of Marrakesh.

It is the biggest city of Al Haouz Province.

== Landmarks ==
The city, described by Footprint Travel Guides as "rather undistinguished", contains a number of important buildings, a hospital, cemetery and several schools such as College Moulay Rachid and Ecole Riyad. The souk of Ait Ourir is of importance to trade in Al Haouz province, with a large market trading agricultural produce, camels, sheep and other items here. A shop at the souk sells tagines cooked over kanounes (cauldrons). Glaoui appears to be an ancient village in the area to the southeast of the city which has effectively become a suburb which contains a kasbah and a mosque. To the southeast is the Ait Ourir Forest. Quartz is mined within the municipality. There are eucalyptus and olive plantations in the area.

== Notable people ==
- Abdelaziz Lemsioui (1944–), Deputy of Commune from 1984 to 1992 and Regional Councillor of Marrakech-Tensift-Al Haouz from 1996 to 2000.
- Abdelkebir Ouaddar, Equestrian
