= Ghmate =

Coordinates: 31°25′40″N 7°47′32″W

- Rural commune
- Interactive map of Ghmate
- Country: Morocco
- Region: Marrakesh-Safi
- Province: Al Haouz

Population (2024)
  - Rural commune: 28,635
  - Urban: 1,359
- Time zone: UTC+0 (GMT)

Ghmate is a rural commune and town in Al Haouz Province, Marrakesh-Safi, Morocco. According to the 2024 census it has a population of 28,635 for the commune and 1,359 for the town.

It contains the archaeological site of Aghmat.
