= Ait Sidi Daoud =

Coordinates: 31.6345°N 7.6440°W

- Rural commune and town
- Interactive map of Ait Sidi Daoud
- Country: Morocco
- Region: Marrakech-Tensift-Al Haouz
- Province: Al Haouz Province

Population (2004)
  - Total: 19,286
- Time zone: UTC+0 (GMT)

Ait Sidi Daoud is a small town and rural commune in Al Haouz Province of the Marrakech-Tensift-Al Haouz region of Morocco. At the time of the 2004 census, the commune had a total population of 19286 people living in 3353 households.
