= Tighedouine =

Tighedouine تغدوين ⵜⵉⵖⴷⵡⵉⵏ
- Rural commune and town
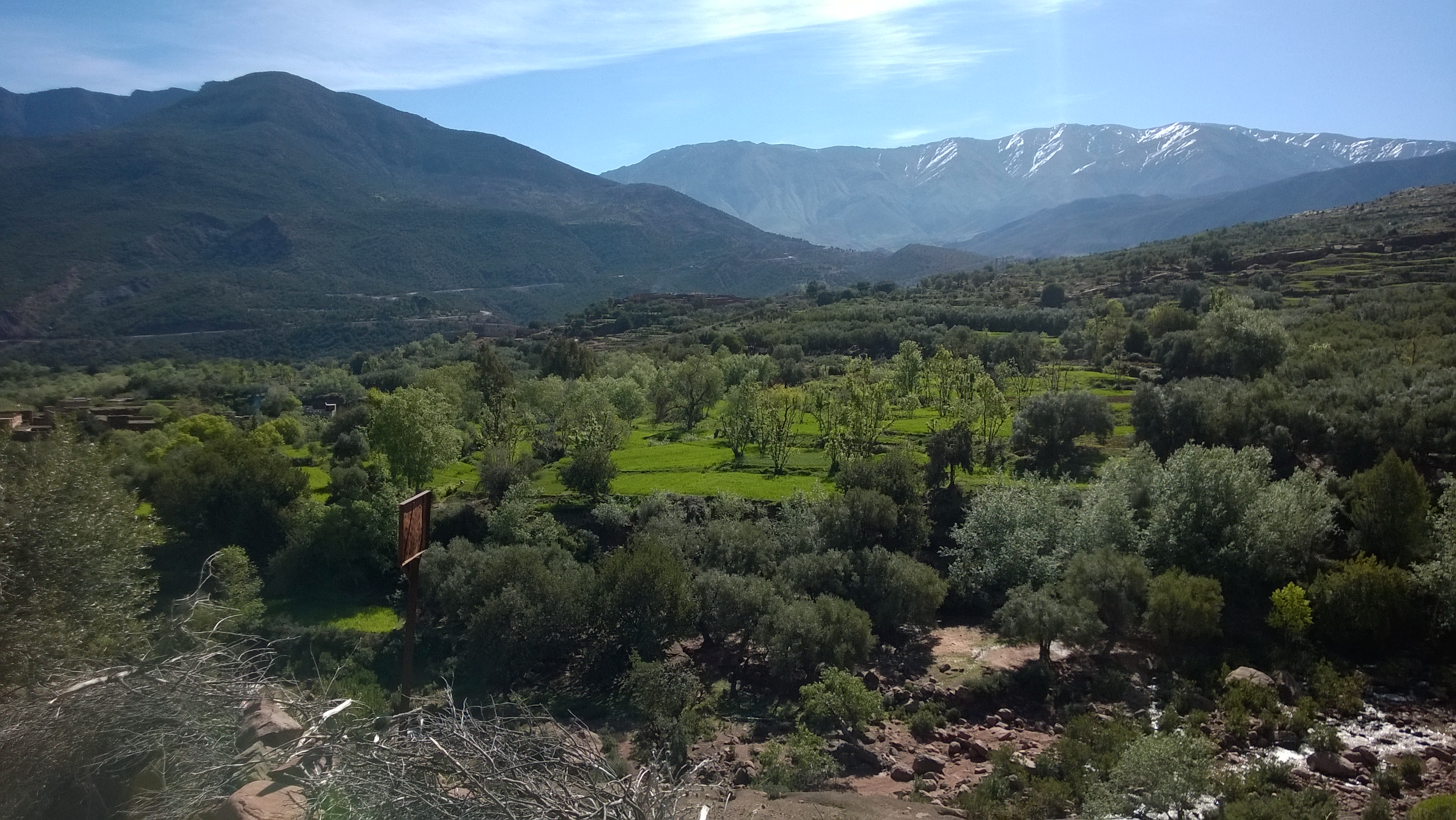
- Interactive map of Tighedouine
- Coordinates: 31°25′25″N 7°31′15″W
- Country: Morocco
- Region: Marrakech-Tensift-Al Haouz
- Province: Al Haouz Province

Population (2004)
  - Total: 22,353
- Time zone: UTC+0 (GMT)

Tighedouine or Tighdouine is a small town and rural commune in Al Haouz Province of the Marrakech-Tensift-Al Haouz region of Morocco. At the time of the 2004 census, the commune had a total population of 22353 people living in 3143 households. The town lies in a fertile valley 29.8 kilometres (18.5 mi) by road to the southeast of Ait Ourir and 63.1 kilometres (39.2 mi) southeast of the city centre of Marrakesh.
