= Lalla Takerkoust =

- Town
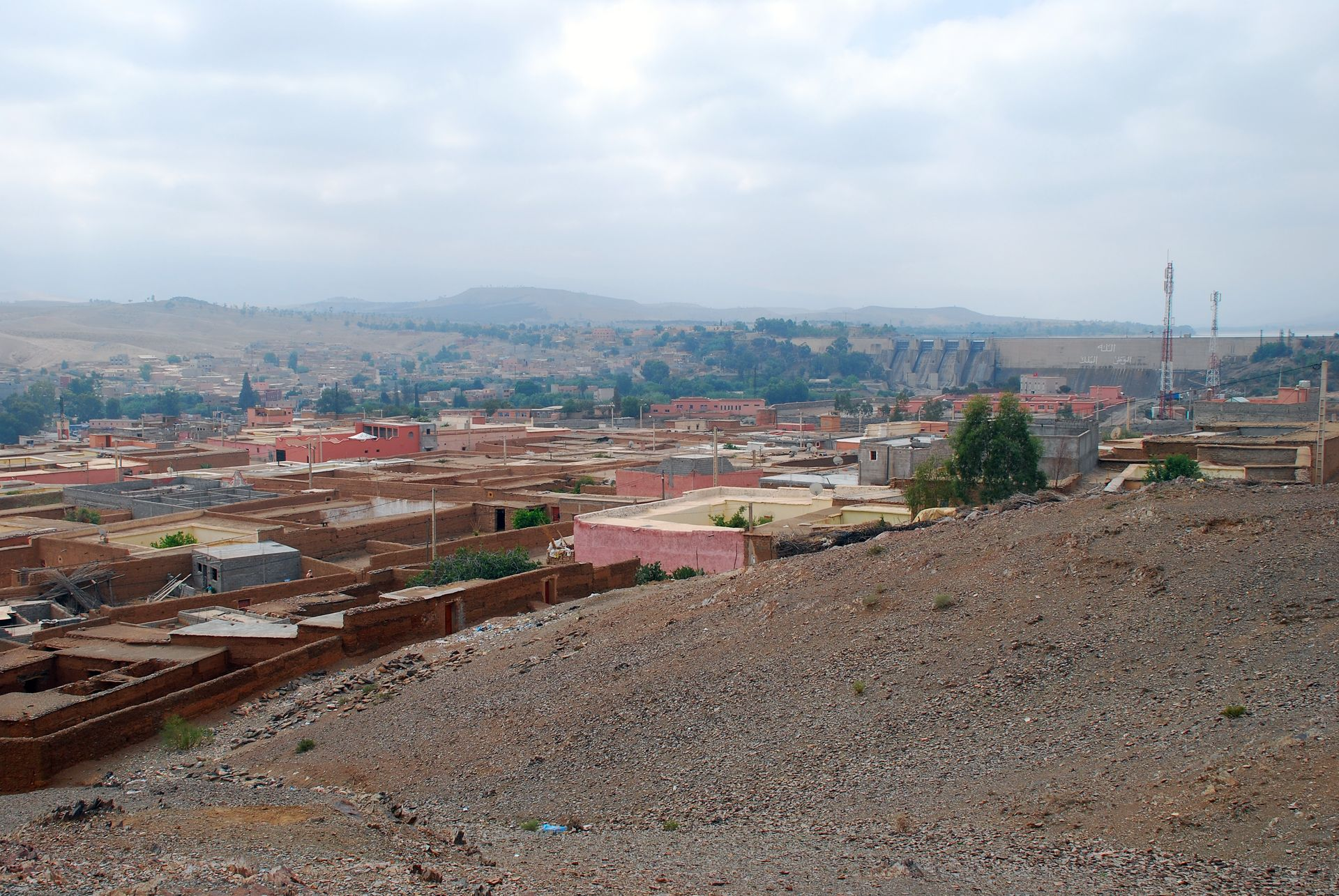

- Location within Morocco
- Coordinates: 31°22′1″N 8°7′59″W
- Country: Morocco
- Region: Marrakech-Safi
- Province: Al Haouz

Population (2004)
  - Total: 3,348
- Time zone: UTC+0 (GMT)

Lalla Takerkoust is a town in Al Haouz Province, Marrakesh-Safi, Morocco. According to the 2004 census it has a population of 3,348.
