= Moulay Brahim =

Moulay Brahim or Mawlāy Ibrāhīm ibn Aḥmad al-Amghārī (died 1661 CE), nicknamed Ṭayr al-Jabal "Bird of the Mountain", was a well-known Moroccan sufi saint.
