= Ourika, Morocco =

Coordinates: 30°43′N 6°32′W

Ourika ⵓⵔⵉⴽⴰ أوريكة
- Rural commune and town
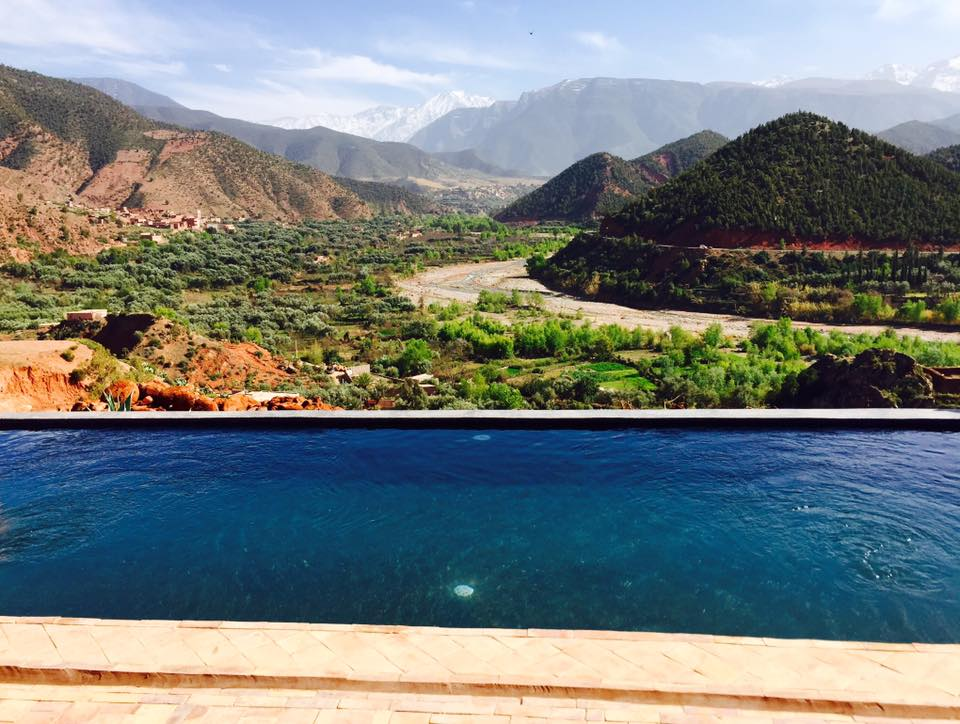
- Interactive map of Ourika
- Country: Morocco
- Region: Marrakesh-Tensift-El Haouz
- Province: Al Haouz Province

Population (2004)
  - Total: 26,990
- Time zone: UTC+0 (GMT)

Ourika is a small town and rural commune in Al Haouz Province of the Marrakesh-Tensift-El Haouz region of Morocco. At the time of the 2004 census, the commune had a total population of 26,990 people living in 4,777 households.
