= Al Haouz Province =

El Haouz Province إقليم الحوز ⵜⴰⵙⴳⴰ ⵏ ⵍⵃⵓⵣ
- Province
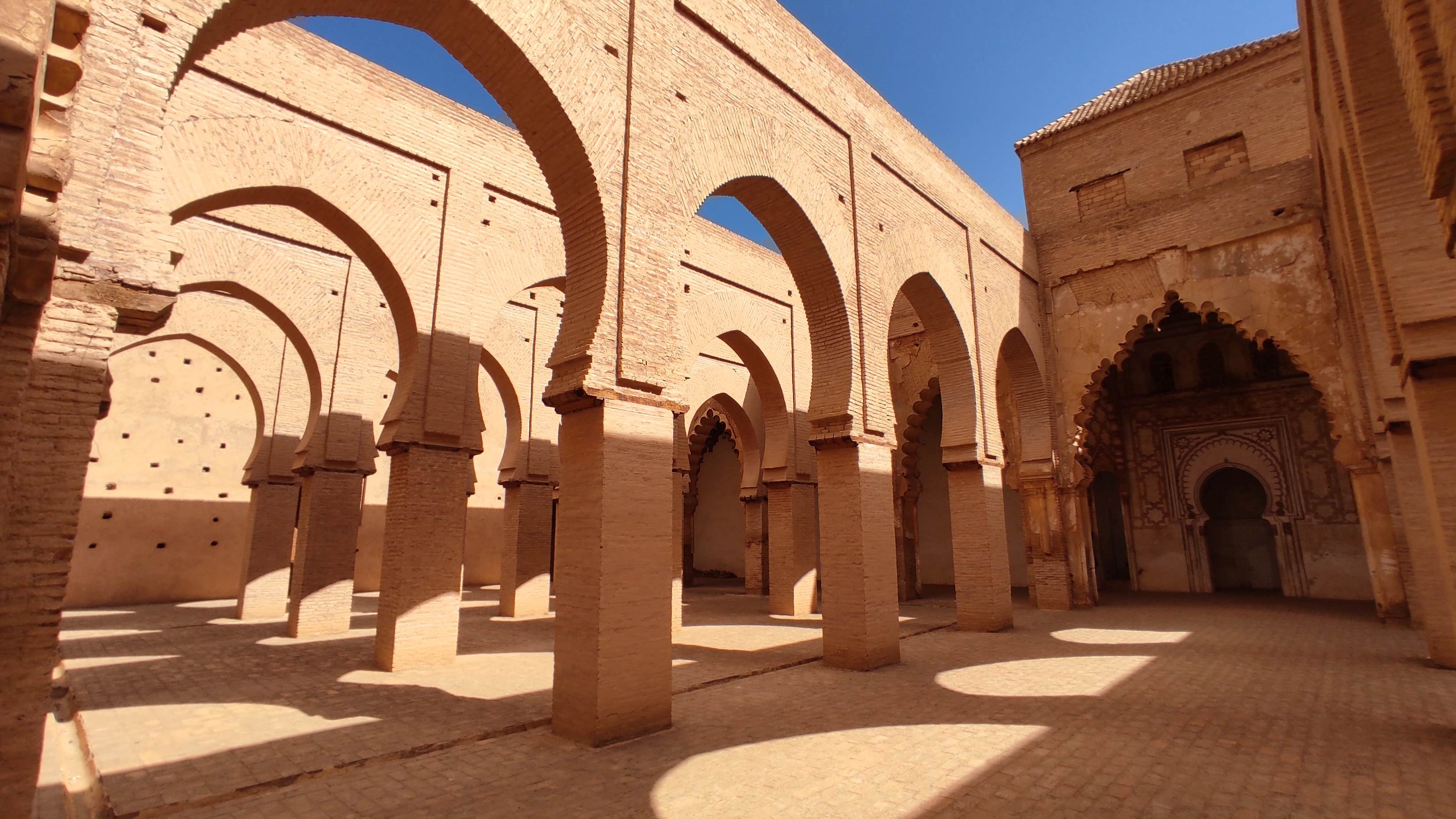
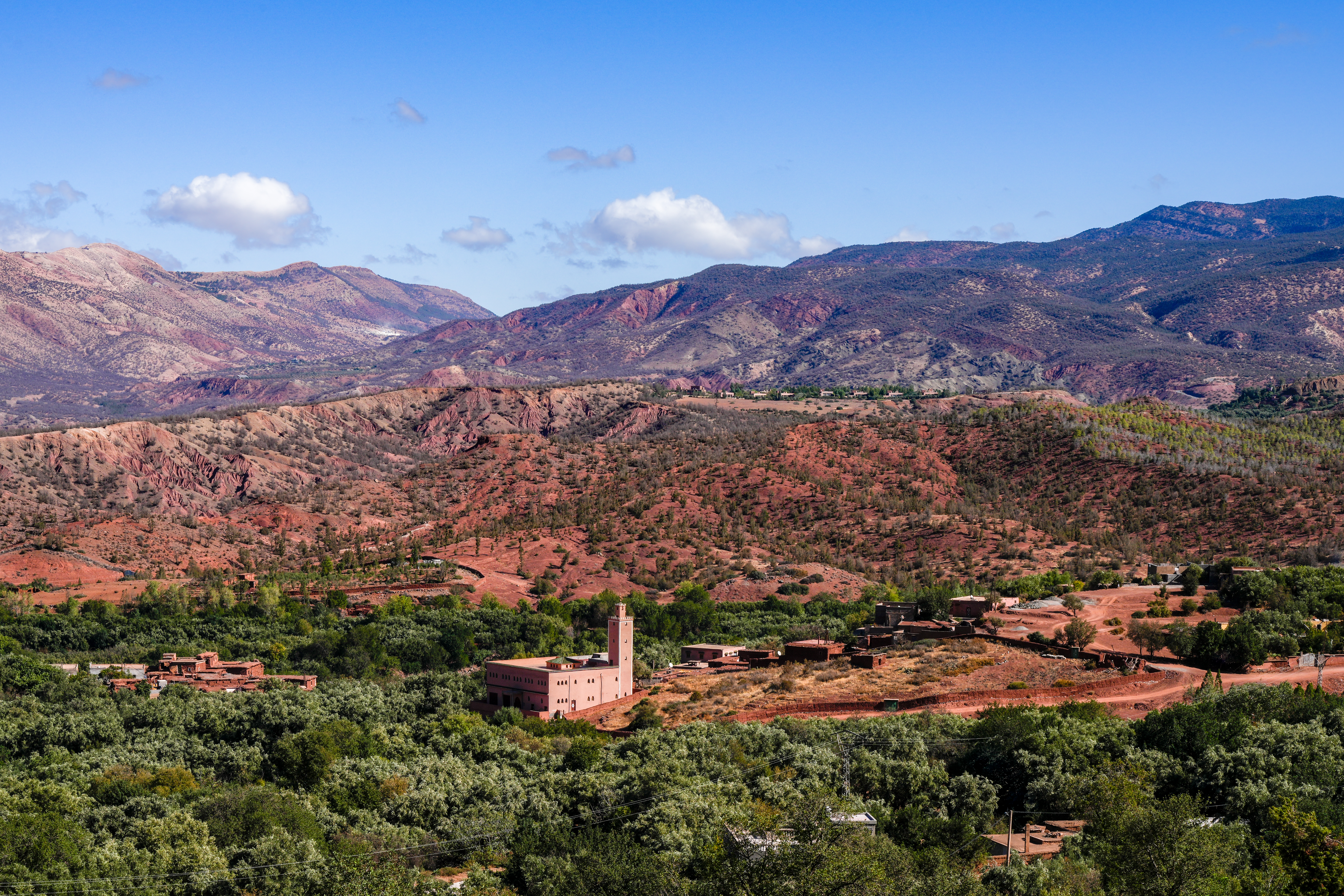
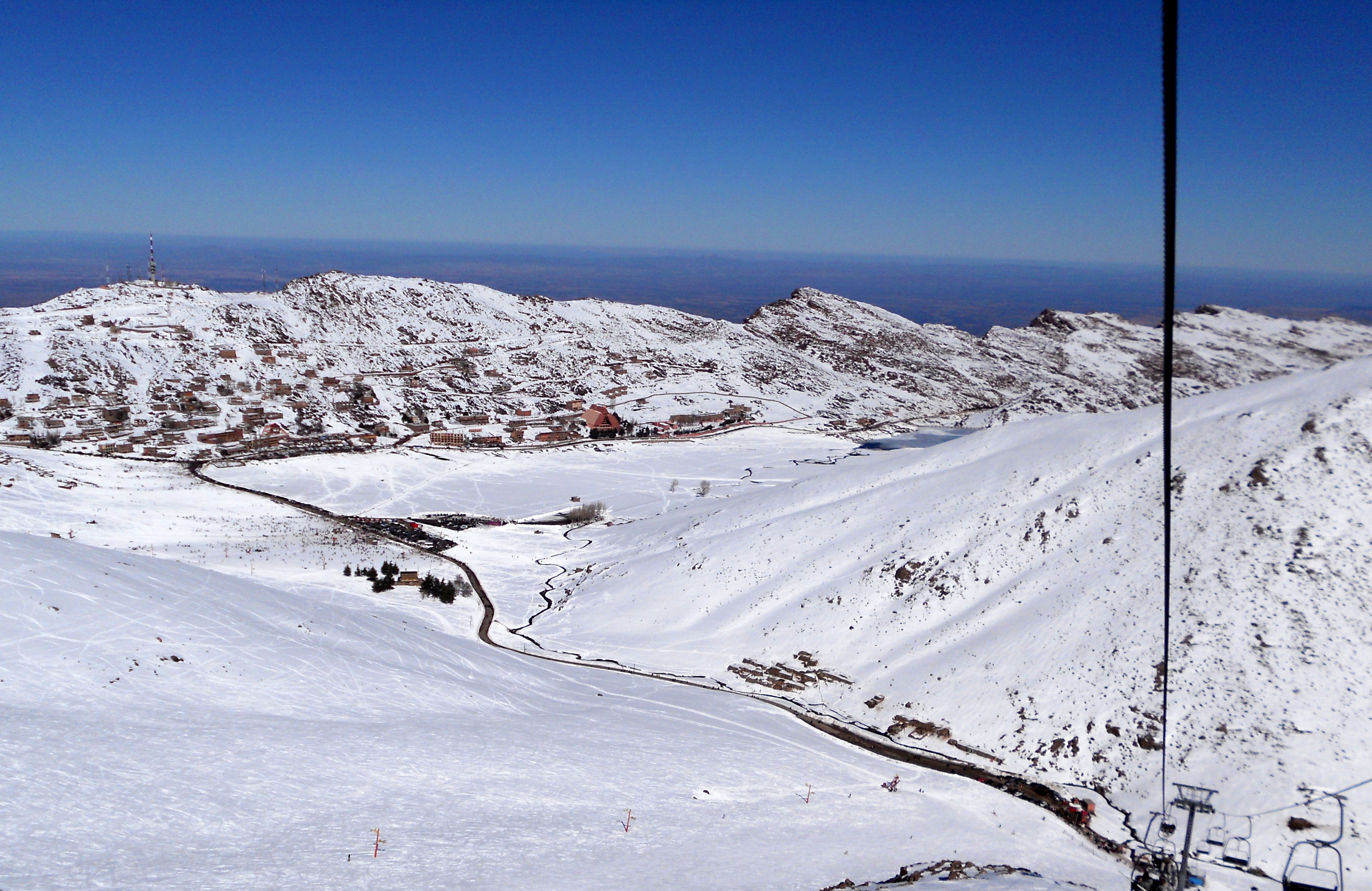
- Tinmel Ouirgane Oukaimden

- Seal
- Interactive map of El Haouz Province
- Coordinates: 31°21′N 7°57′W
- Country: Morocco
- Region: Marrakesh-Safi
- Capital: Tahannaout

Government
  - Governor: Touimi Omar

Population (2024)
  - Total: 642,171
- Time zone: UTC+0 (GMT)

Al Haouz (Arabic: إقليم الحوز, Standard Moroccan Tamazight: ⵜⴰⵙⴳⴰ ⵏ ⵍⵃⵓⵣ) is a predominantly rural province in the Moroccan economic region of Marrakesh-Safi. Its population in 2024 was 642,171. the capital is Tahannaout, and the biggest city is Ait Ourir.

The major cities and towns are:

- Ait Ourir
- Amizmiz
- Tahannaout
- Tameslouht
- Ourika
- Ghmate

In September 2023 the province was the epicenter (31.073°N 8.407°W) of a violent magnitude 6.9 earthquake which upon first reports left over 2,800 people dead and more than 3,000 others injured.

== Subdivisions ==
Communes of Al Haouz Province

The province is divided administratively into the following:

=== Municipalities ===
Name	Geographic code	Households (2024)	Population (2024)
Ait Ourir	041.01.01.	13312	56954
Amizmiz	041.01.03.	3664	13840
Tahannaout	041.01.09.	3847	16236

=== Rural communes ===
Name	Geographic code	Households (2024)	Population (2024)	Notes
Abadou	041.11.01.	2157	10484	
Aghbar	041.07.01.	852	3447	
Ait Aadel	041.11.03.	1603	8724	
Ait Faska	041.03.05.	7528	33076	
Ait Hkim Ait Yzid	041.11.07.	1517	8104	
Ait Sidi Daoud	041.03.09.	4846	21010	
Amghras	041.05.01.	1492	5966	
Anougal	041.05.05.	1016	4006	
Asni	041.07.03.	4966	22637	
Azgour	041.05.07.	1597	6208	
Dar Jamaa	041.05.09.	1549	6184	
Ghmate	041.03.11.	6526	28674	Urban centre: Ghmate (1,359 inhabitants; 330 households)
Ighil	041.07.05.	1069	4666	
Iguerferouane	041.03.13.	2559	12432	
Ijoukak	041.07.07.	1415	5633	
Imgdal	041.07.09.	1336	4782	
Lalla Takarkoust	041.05.11.	2097	8419	Urban centre: Lalla Takarkoust (4,827 inhabitants; 1,193 households)
Moulay Brahim	041.09.01.	2634	11331	Urban centre: Moulay Brahim (2,609 inhabitants; 709 households)
Ouazguita	041.05.13.	1254	5270	
Ouirgane	041.07.11.	1830	7687	
Oukaimden	041.09.03.	932	4790	
Oulad Mtaa	041.05.15.	1722	6915	
Ourika	041.09.05.	11574	50558	Urban centre: Ourika (24,056 inhabitants; 5,683 households)
Sidi Abdallah Ghiat	041.03.15.	10274	43237	Urban centre: Sidi Abdellah Ghiat (2,513 inhabitants; 599 households)
Sidi Badhaj	041.05.17.	1449	5835	
Sti Fadma	041.09.07.	5162	24159	
Talat N'Yaaqoub	041.07.13.	1954	7153	
Tamaguert	041.11.17.	2313	10022	
Tamazouzte	041.03.19.	3824	16886	
Tameslohte	041.09.11.	9911	40283	Urban centre: Tameslohte (10,481 inhabitants; 2,604 households)
Tazart	041.11.21.	3144	14584	
Tidili Mesfioua	041.03.23.	4611	20283	
Tighedouine	041.11.25.	4152	21161	
Tizguine	041.05.19.	1433	5185	
Touama	041.11.27.	2761	11401	
Zerkten	041.11.29.	3833	18335	
