= Amizmiz =

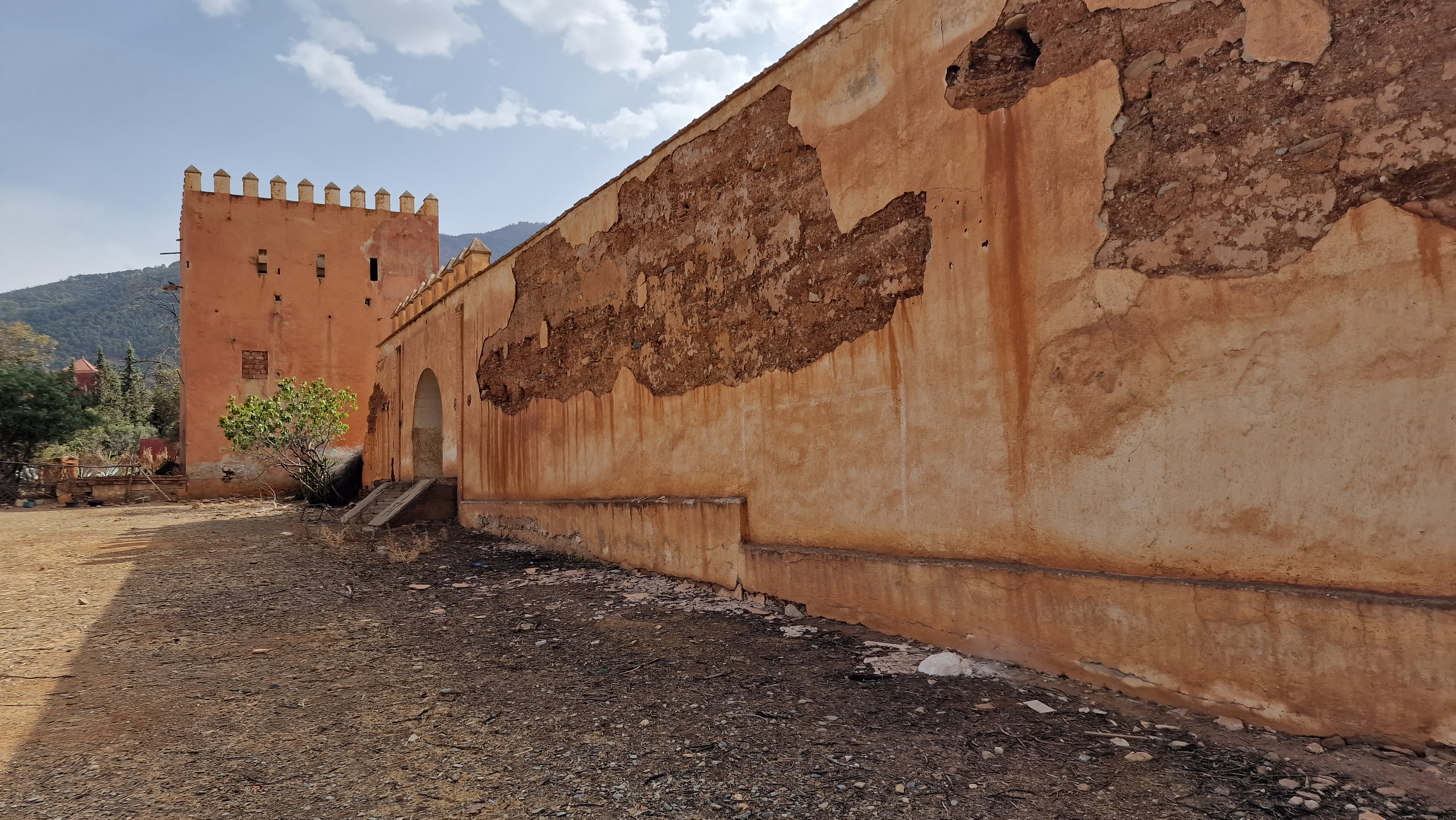
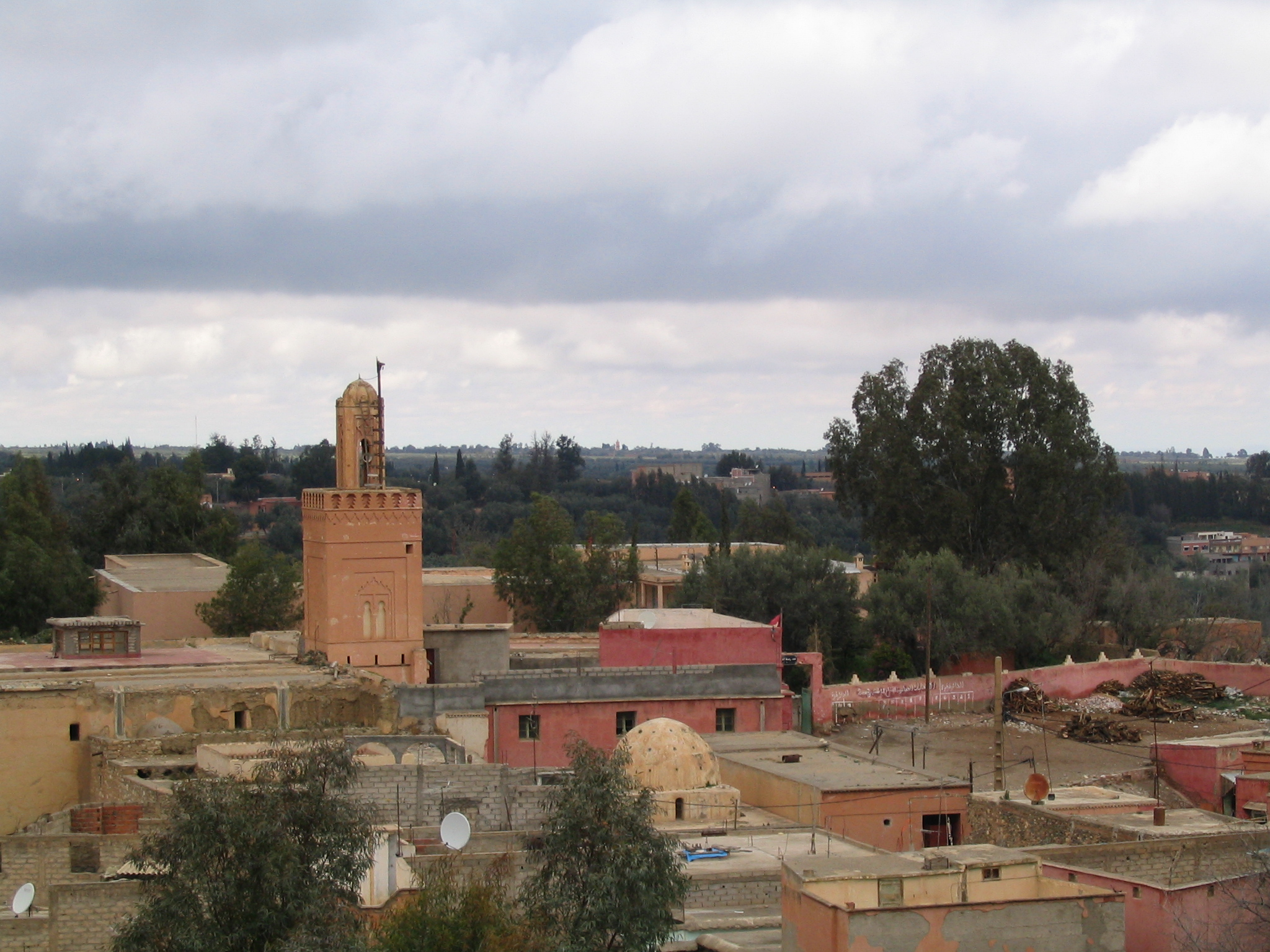
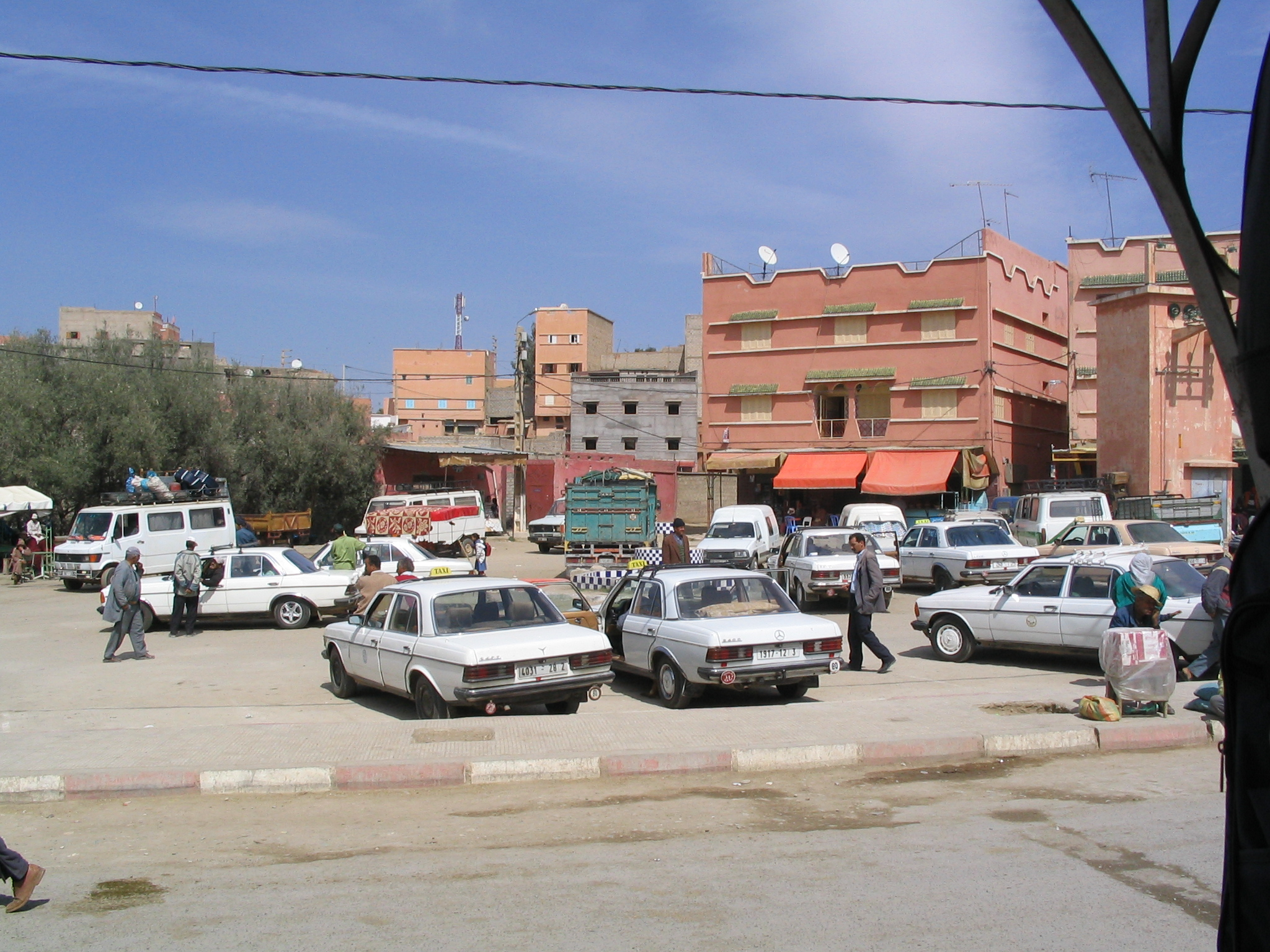
- Interactive map of Amizmiz
- Coordinates: 31°13′N 8°15′W
- Country: Morocco
- Region: Marrakesh-Safi
- Province: Al Haouz
- Time zone: UTC+0 (GMT)

Amizmiz (Tachelhit: ⴰⵎⵥⵎⵉⵥ, romanized: amᵊẓmiẓ, pronounced [ˈæməzˁmizˁ]; Arabic: أمزميز) is a small town in Al Haouz Province approximately 55 kilometers south of Marrakesh, Morocco. It lies at the foot of the High Atlas.

Its population of approximately 14,000 consists mainly of Berbers of Shilha origin who speak the Shilha language (Tashelhit), a member of the northern branch of the Berber languages. Its weekly souk every Tuesday is well-known in the area.

Geographically and economically, Amizmiz acts as a juncture point between the many small Berber villages in the surrounding area. The weekly souk is an important part of this economic role, as individual farmers from the hills surrounding Amizmiz bring their produce and livestock to sell and, in return, purchase packaged food items like tea and sugar—items brought in from Marrakesh by local merchants.
