= Ighil =

Ighil may refer to:

- Ighil, Algeria
- Ighil, Morocco
