= 2023 Al Haouz earthquake =

Earthquake in Morocco

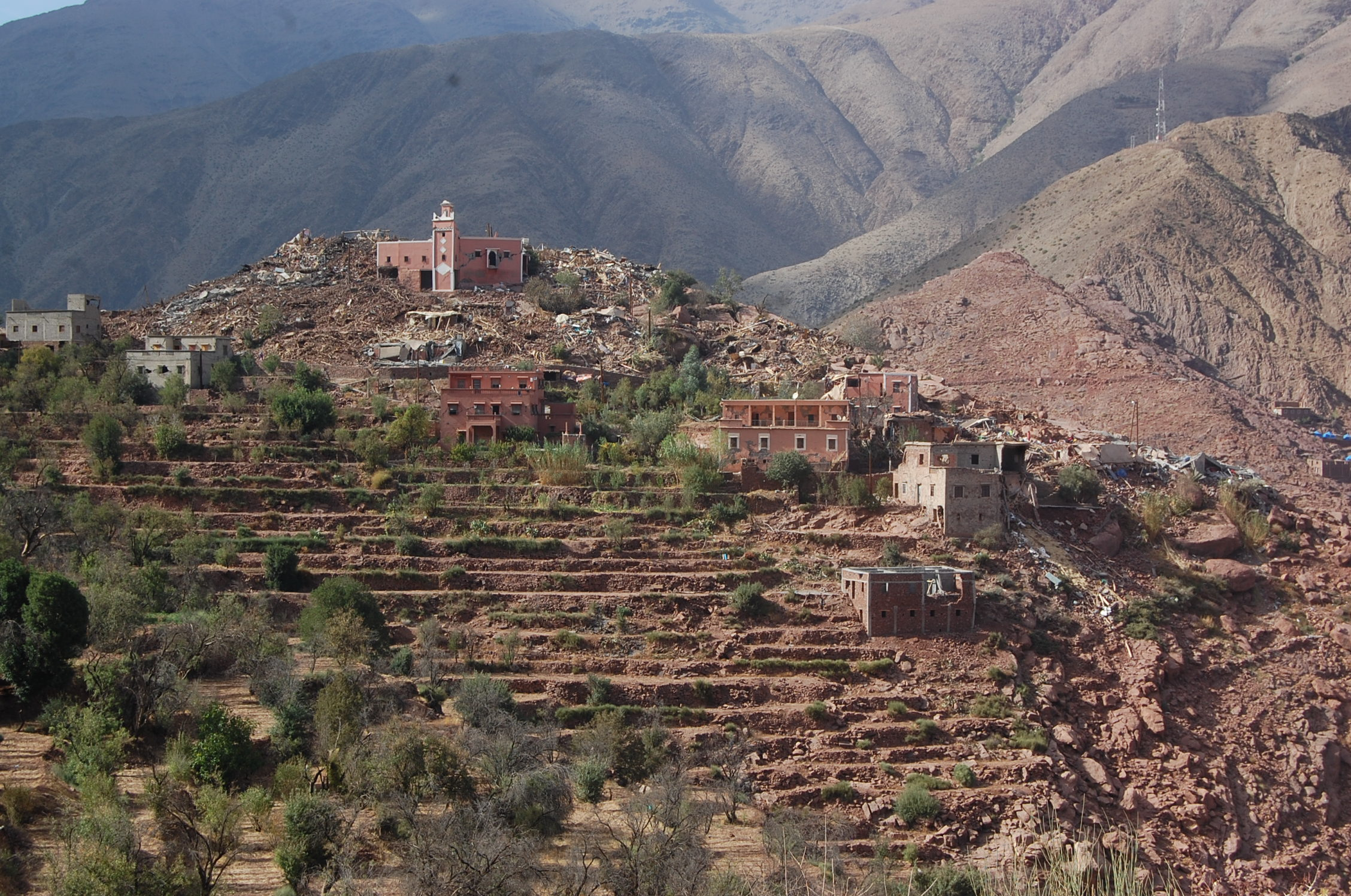
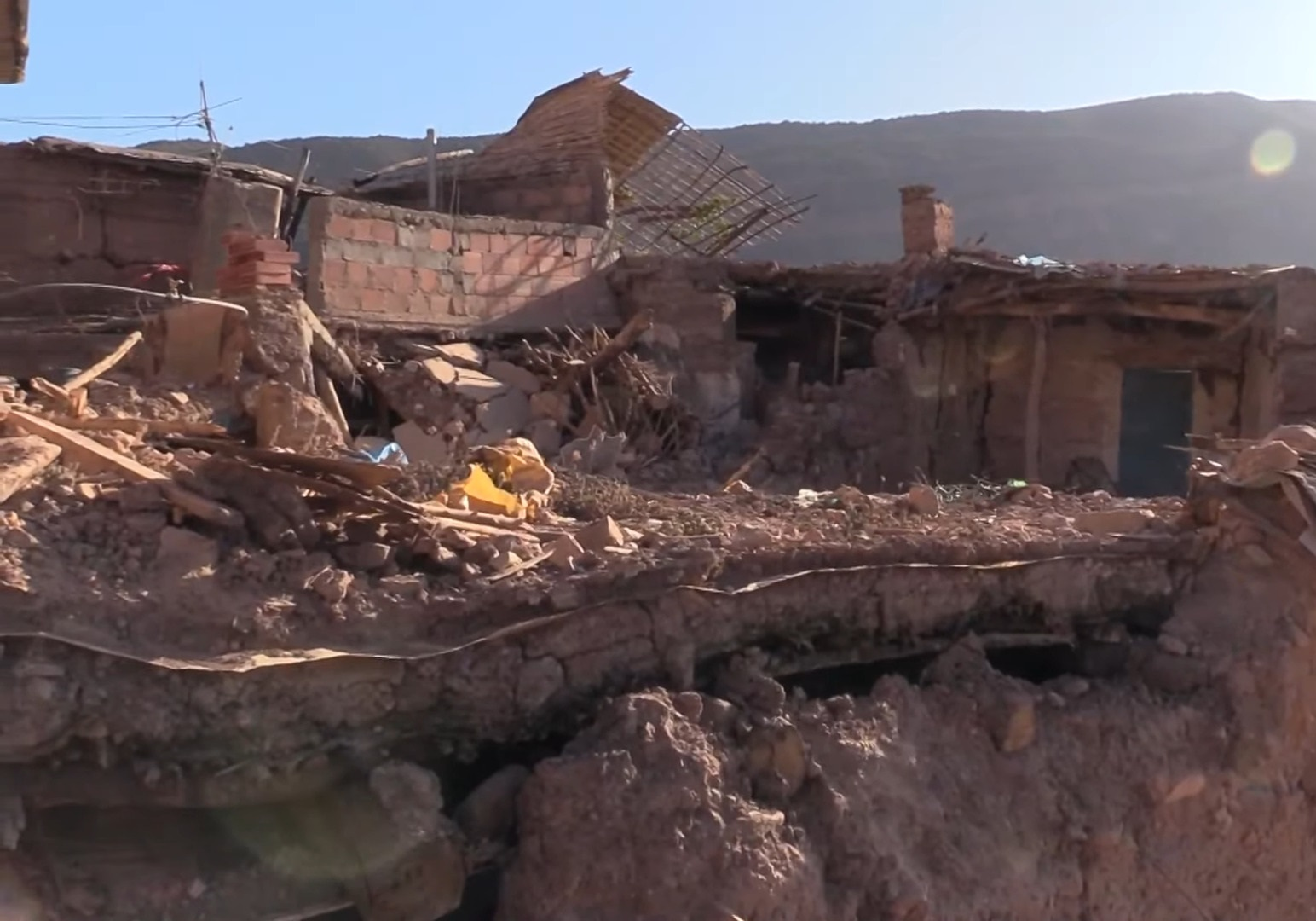
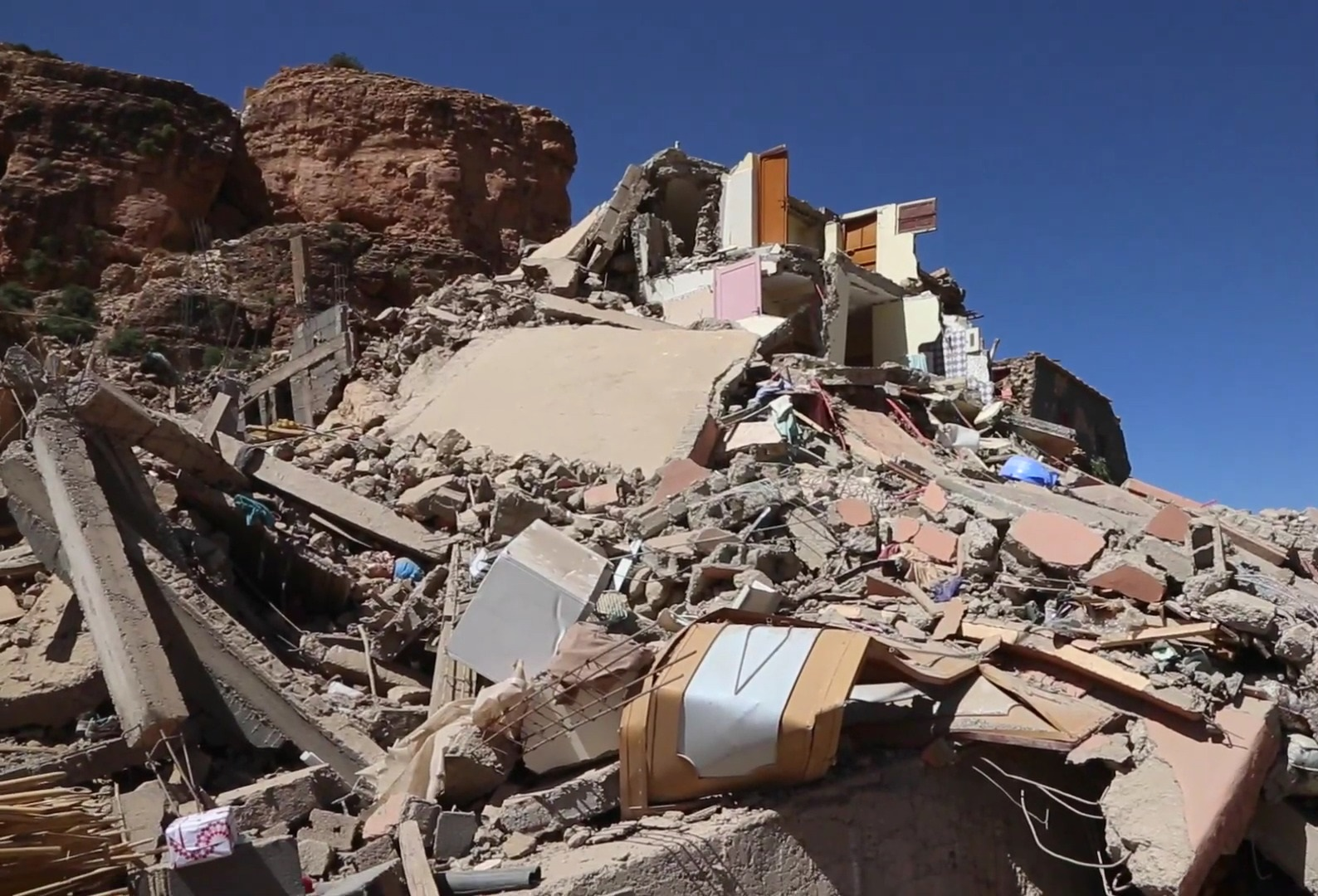
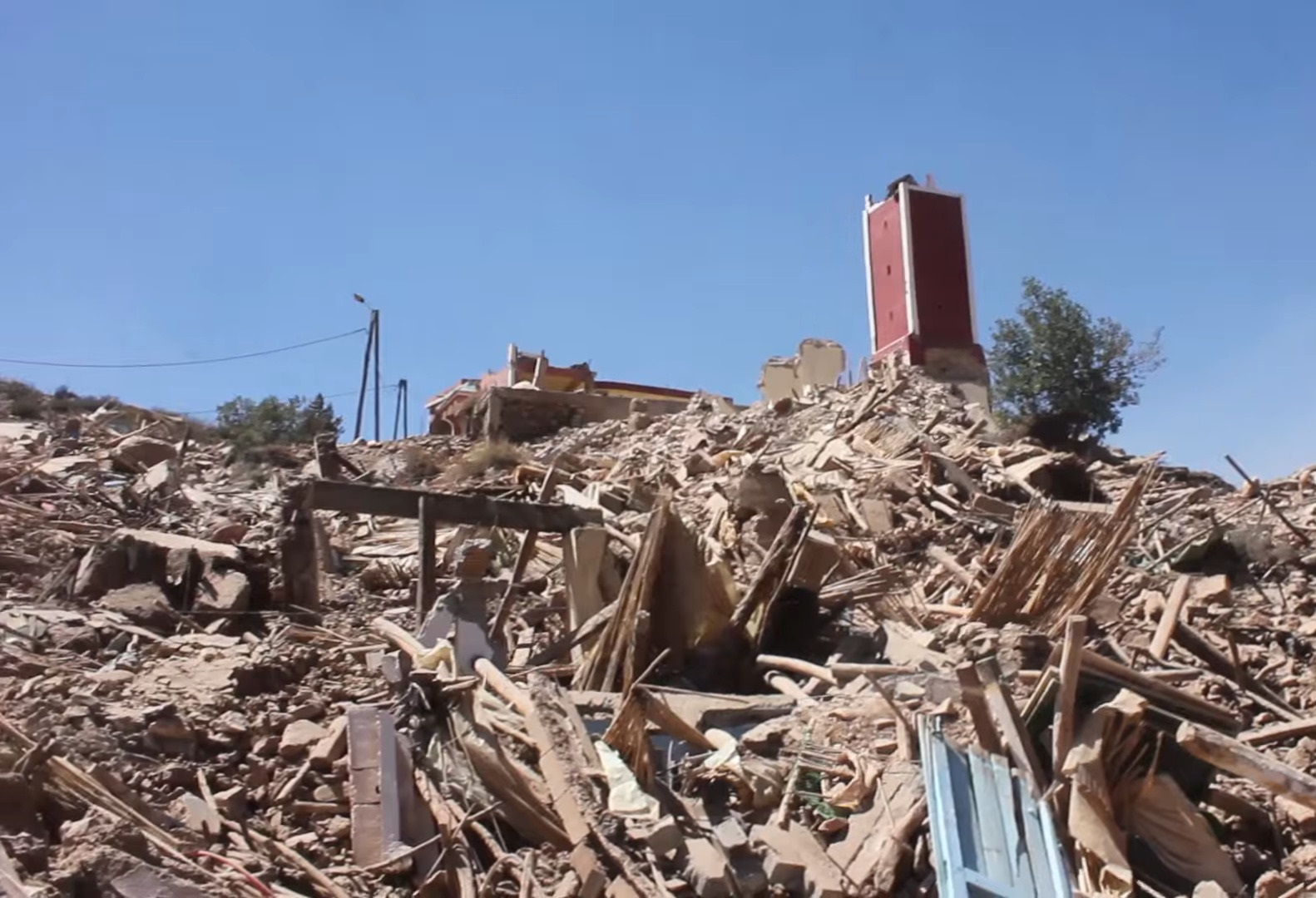
- Clockwise from top: Imi N'Tala, Moulay Brahim, Tizi N'Test and Tansghart after the earthquake

- Location within Morocco
- UTC time: 2023-09-08 22:11:01
- ISC event: 626740945
- USGS-ANSS: ComCat
- Local date: 8 September 2023
- Local time: 23:11 DST
- Magnitude: 6.9 M_{w}
- Depth: 19.0 km (11.8 mi)
- Epicenter: 31.073°N 8.407°W
- Type: Oblique-thrust
- Areas affected: Morocco
- Total damage: US$7 billion
- Max. intensity: MMI IX (Violent)
- Casualties: 2,960 killed, 5,674 injured

On 8 September 2023 at 23:11 DST (22:11 UTC), an earthquake with a moment magnitude of 6.9 and maximum Mercalli intensity of IX (Violent) struck Morocco's Al Haouz Province. The earthquake's epicenter was 73.4 km (45.6 mi) southwest of Marrakesh, near the town of Ighil and the Oukaïmeden ski resort in the Atlas Mountains. It occurred as a result of shallow oblique-thrust faulting beneath the mountain range. At least 2,960 deaths were reported, with most occurring outside Marrakesh. Damage was widespread, and historic landmarks in Marrakesh were destroyed. The earthquake was also felt in Spain, Portugal, and Algeria.

It is the strongest instrumentally recorded earthquake in Morocco, the deadliest in the country since the 1960 Agadir earthquake, and the second-deadliest earthquake of 2023 after the Turkey–Syria earthquakes. Its magnitude also makes it the largest earthquake on the African continent since the 2006 M_{w} 7.0 Mozambique earthquake and the largest in North Africa since the 1980 M_{w} 7.1 El Asnam earthquake. Over 2.8 million people from Marrakesh and areas surrounding the Atlas Mountains were affected, including 100,000 children. Following the earthquake, many countries offered humanitarian assistance, and Morocco announced a three-day period of national mourning.

== Tectonic setting ==
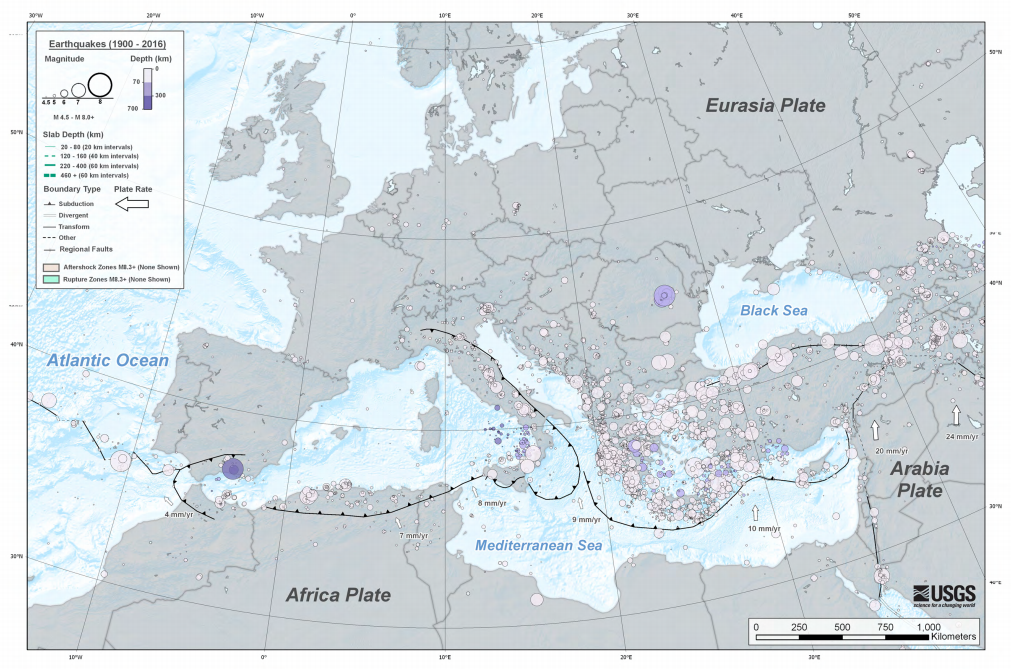
Earthquakes M5.5+ (1900–2016) in Mediterranean and North Africa

Morocco lies south of a major tectonic boundary between the African and Eurasian plates, the Azores–Gibraltar transform fault. This major fault stretches from the Azores to Gibraltar Strait where it is dominated by right-latera strike-slip movement. In the Gibraltar Arc and Alboran Sea, at the eastern end of the fault it becomes transpressional with the development of large thrust faults. East of the Strait of Gibraltar, in the Alboran Sea, the boundary becomes collisional in type. Most of the seismicity in Morocco is related to movement on that plate boundary, with the greatest seismic hazard in the north of the country close to the boundary. In 2004, the coastal province of Al Hoceima was struck by a magnitude 6.3 earthquake that left 628 people dead and 926 injured. In nearby Algeria, magnitude 7.3 earthquake occurred in 1980 that killed 2,500 people.

The Atlas Mountains are an intracontinental mountain belt that extends 2,000 km (1,200 mi) from Morocco to Tunisia. These mountains formed from a collision during the Cenozoic. The mountain range reaches its highest elevation to the west, in Morocco. The High Atlas, a subrange, formed when an ancient Triassic rift was reactivated. However rather than resuming the rifting process, the reactivation compressed the rift due to the collision in the north. Due to the unusually high topography of the Atlas range, mantle upwelling may have played a role in its orogeny. The crust beneath the Atlas range from 32–40 km (20–25 mi), considered thin and physically impossible to support high elevations exceeding 4,000 m (13,000 ft). Typically, a crustal thickness of 50 km (31 mi) is required, hence mantle upwelling raises the overlying crust.

The seismicity of Morocco is concentrated in its northern region and the Alboran Sea. South of the Rif, seismic activity is sparse but widely distributed across the Middle Atlas, High Atlas, and Anti-Atlas. Seismicity in the Saharan Atlas is limited, and is absent in the Saharan region south of the belt; it is also less active eastwards in Algeria and Tunisia. Previously, the largest earthquake recorded in the Atlas Mountains was a M_{w} 5.9 earthquake that struck Agadir in 1960. Earthquakes in the Atlas Mountains display focal mechanisms of strike-slip, thrust or a combination of both (oblique-slip).

== Earthquake ==
M_{w}6.8 earthquake at 22:11 UTC

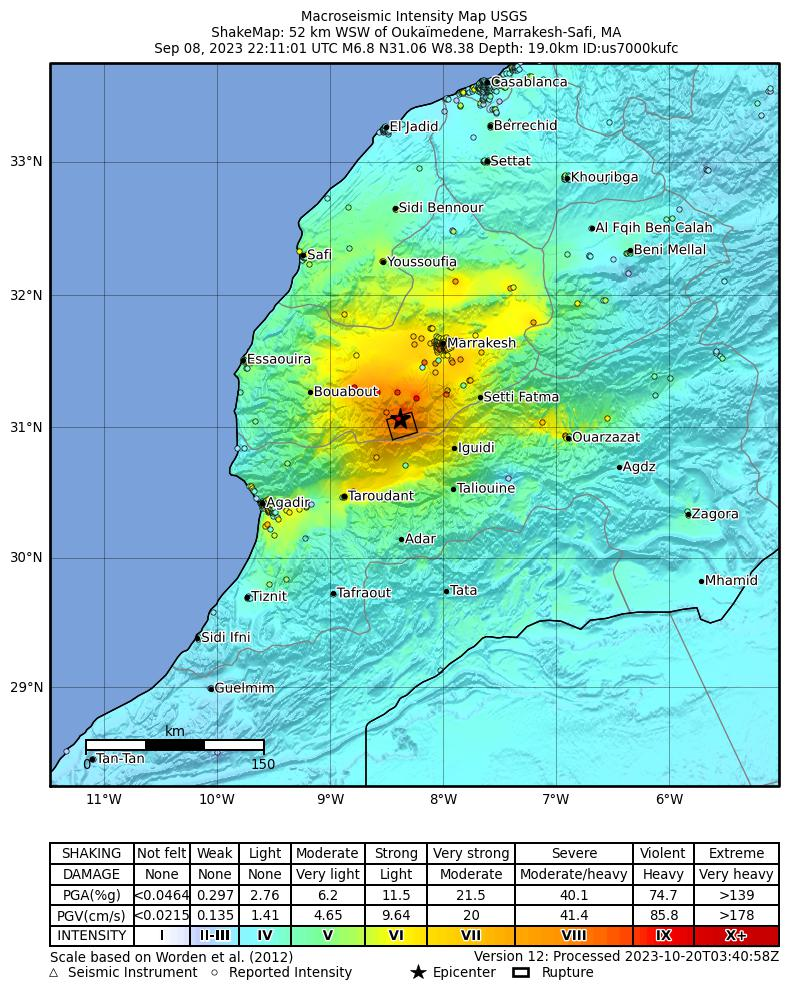
Strong ground motion map

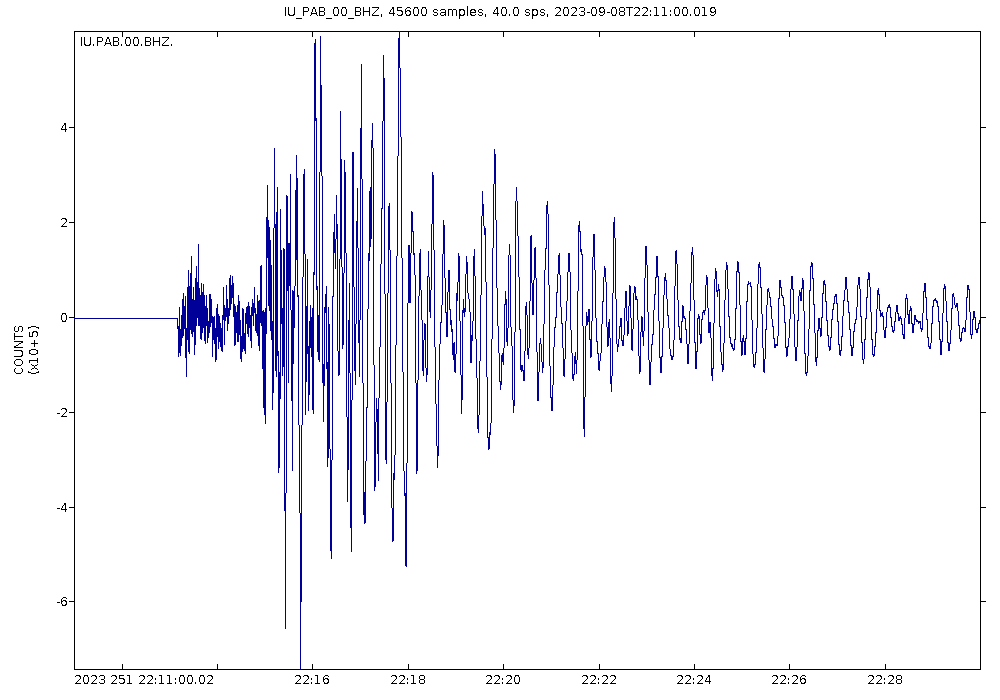
Seismogram

Main shock and aftershocks in Al Haouz Province, Marrakesh-Safi region – M 2.0 or greater (map data)

Measuring M_{w} 6.9 at a depth of 19 km (12 mi), it is the strongest earthquake recorded by a seismograph with an epicenter in Morocco. Morocco's seismic agency reported a M_{wp} of 7.2 and focal depth of 8 km (5.0 mi). The tremors were detected by monitoring stations as far away as Egypt.

=== Mechanism ===
The earthquake had a focal mechanism indicating oblique-thrust faulting beneath the High Atlas. The rupture occurred on a steep-dipping oblique-reverse fault striking northwest or a shallow-dipping oblique-reverse fault striking east. The USGS estimated the fault rupture area to be 30 km (19 mi) by 25 km (16 mi) on an east-northeast striking, north–northwest dipping fault. Slip was generally observed at 15 km (9.3 mi) to 35 km (22 mi) depth, but mostly concentrated around the hypocentre within an elliptical slip patch 30 km (19 mi) long by 25 km (16 mi) wide. A maximum displacement of 1.9 m (6 ft 3 in) was observed at 25 km (16 mi) depth while there was little to no slip above 15 km (9.3 mi) depth. Many east-west and northeast–southwest strike-slip and thrust faults occur in the High Atlas. Since 1900, there has not been a M_{w} 6.0 or larger earthquake within 500 km (310 mi) of the recent earthquake's epicenter; but nine M_{w} 5.0 and larger events have occurred to its east. In another finite fault model published by Italy's National Institute of Geophysics and Volcanology, the focal depth was determined at 24.7 km (15.3 mi) beneath the High Atlas. The focal mechanism of this model displayed reverse and left-lateral faulting. Slip occurred in an elliptical area along an east-northeast–west-southwest trending fault dipping 69° north–northwest. A peak slip of 2 m (6 ft 7 in) occurred at 23.3 km (14.5 mi).

Geodetic modeling suggests the earthquake originated from within the lower crust and ruptured up to the middle crust. The deeper depth and greater remoteness from populated areas compared to the earthquake that struck Agadir in 1960 meant it caused fewer casualties and damage. The range of depth where slip occurred is unusually deep for crustal earthquakes as they tend to occur shallower than 15 km (9.3 mi) depth. Fluid and magma associated with the mantle plume beneath the High Atlas may have intruded via a fault and pervade across, bringing it closer to rupture.

No surface faulting occurred hence the causative fault responsible could not be identified, however the focal mechanism suggests rupture on a steep north-dipping plane or shallow south-dipping plane. The USGS finite fault is aligned with the former solution. Two dominant shallow-dipping thrust systems, the North and South Atlas faults, occur in the western High Atlas. Their fault geometries contradict that of the USGS finite fault's preferred steep-dipping plane. Other unmapped faults within the range, including the Tizi n'Test Fault, have surface projections that match closer to the USGS finite fault. If the rupture occurred on the shallow south-dipping plane, a possible source is a low-angle detachment beneath the High Atlas. Geologists have previously interpreted low-angle faults in the region in past studies. For the steep north-dipping plane, the possible source are unmapped or blind thrust faults. The Tizi n'Test Fault, a north-dipping fault where no recent activity has been recorded, may be a possible source of the earthquake. Cornell University geologist Judith Hubbard said the fault was active 300 million years ago during the formation of Pangaea and later, its fragmentation. Ancient faults, such as the Tizi n'Test Fault, create zones of strain within the crust and could reactivate, such as the case in Morocco.

=== Ground effects ===
Vertical movement of the land surface detected by repeat observations of the Sentinel-1 satellite is consistent with movement on a blind thrust fault dipping north. An analysis of satellite data obtained from Daichi-2 by the Geospatial Information Authority of Japan revealed a 20 cm (7.9 in) surface uplift around the epicenter and 7 cm (2.8 in) of subsidence to the south. Surface deformation was observed around the epicenter across a 50 km (31 mi) area trending east–west, and 100 km (62 mi) trending north–south.

According to the United States Geological Survey's PAGER service, the earthquake had a maximum Modified Mercalli intensity of IX (Violent). Intensity VIII (Severe) shaking was felt by approximately 157,000 residents, including the town of Azgour and villages surrounding the Atlas Mountains. Intensity VII (Very Strong) shaking was felt by over 811,000 people, with intensity VI (Strong) shaking felt by 3.2 million residents, including in the cities of Marrakesh, Taroudant and Ouarzazate. Shaking of intensity V (Moderate) was felt in Agadir, Beni Mellal, and Safi, with intensity IV (Light) shaking being felt in Casablanca. According to the European-Mediterranean Seismological Centre, it was also felt in Portugal, Spain, Mauritania, Algeria, Western Sahara and along the coast of the Strait of Gibraltar.

== Damage and casualties ==
Affected areas and damage assessment, EU Emergency Response Coordination Centre (ERCC)

At least 2,960 people died and 5,674 were injured; including over 2,500 other who were seriously injured. Many fatalities occurred in remote locations south of Marrakesh. In Al-Haouz and Taroudant provinces, the death toll stood at 1,684 and 980, respectively. Forty-one people died in Ouarzazate; 400 in Taroudant; 202 in Chichaoua; 100 in Douzrou; 40 in Moulay Brahim; 30 in Ouirgane; 15 in Tinmel; 36 in Anerni; 22 in Tinzart; and 18 died in Marrakesh. Deaths also occurred in Casablanca, Agadir and Youssoufia. Four French and a British national were among the fatalities. Fifteen French nationals and some Americans were injured. At least 40,759 houses and 2,930 villages were damaged; 19,095 additional houses collapsed. At least 585 schools were damaged, seven teachers died and 39 others were injured. More than 18,000 families were affected in Al-Haouz alone. One person was injured by rockfalls in Imi N'Tala following an aftershock on 13 September.

The earthquake caused $7 billion in damage; the direct economic loss of $308 million represented 0.24% of the nation's GDP. The majority of damage occurred in Marrakesh and five provinces around the epicenter. Near the epicenter, at Amizmiz, damage was reported throughout, and rescuers used their hands to sort through debris. Nearly all of the 50 traditional houses in the village of Majat were destroyed and dozens of people died. Ninety-percent of houses in Asni were destroyed, while in Essaouira, building's facades toppled.

Some homes in the older districts of Marrakesh and parts of the city walls collapsed; at Jemaa el-Fnaa, a minaret of the Kharboush Mosque and parts of its walls collapsed onto vehicles. Damage also occurred at the Kutubiyya Mosque while several historic buildings in the Medina of Marrakesh also collapsed. A tower of the Tinmel Mosque partially collapsed and the surrounding walls fell.

The towns of Tafeghaghte, Adassil and Imlil, and nearby villages surrounding Mount Toubkal were destroyed or severely damaged. An estimated 200 homes were destroyed in Ijoukak and between 80 and 100 residents, around half of its population, were killed. In Tafeghaghte, a village of 200 residents, 90 died and many remained missing. The village of Ighil, near the epicenter, was also severely damaged, however only one injury occurred, as nearly all of the village's residents were attending an outdoor wedding at the time of the earthquake. In Adassil, 32 students from the same school were killed. Outside Agadir, in the villages of Taqi and Tadrart, many homes were destroyed. At least 70 people died in the village of Imi N'Tala. In the city of Taroudant, several old or historic districts were badly damaged. The condition in Tinzart was described as "one giant pile of rubble".

Earthquake aftermath in Marrakesh and Moulay Brahim

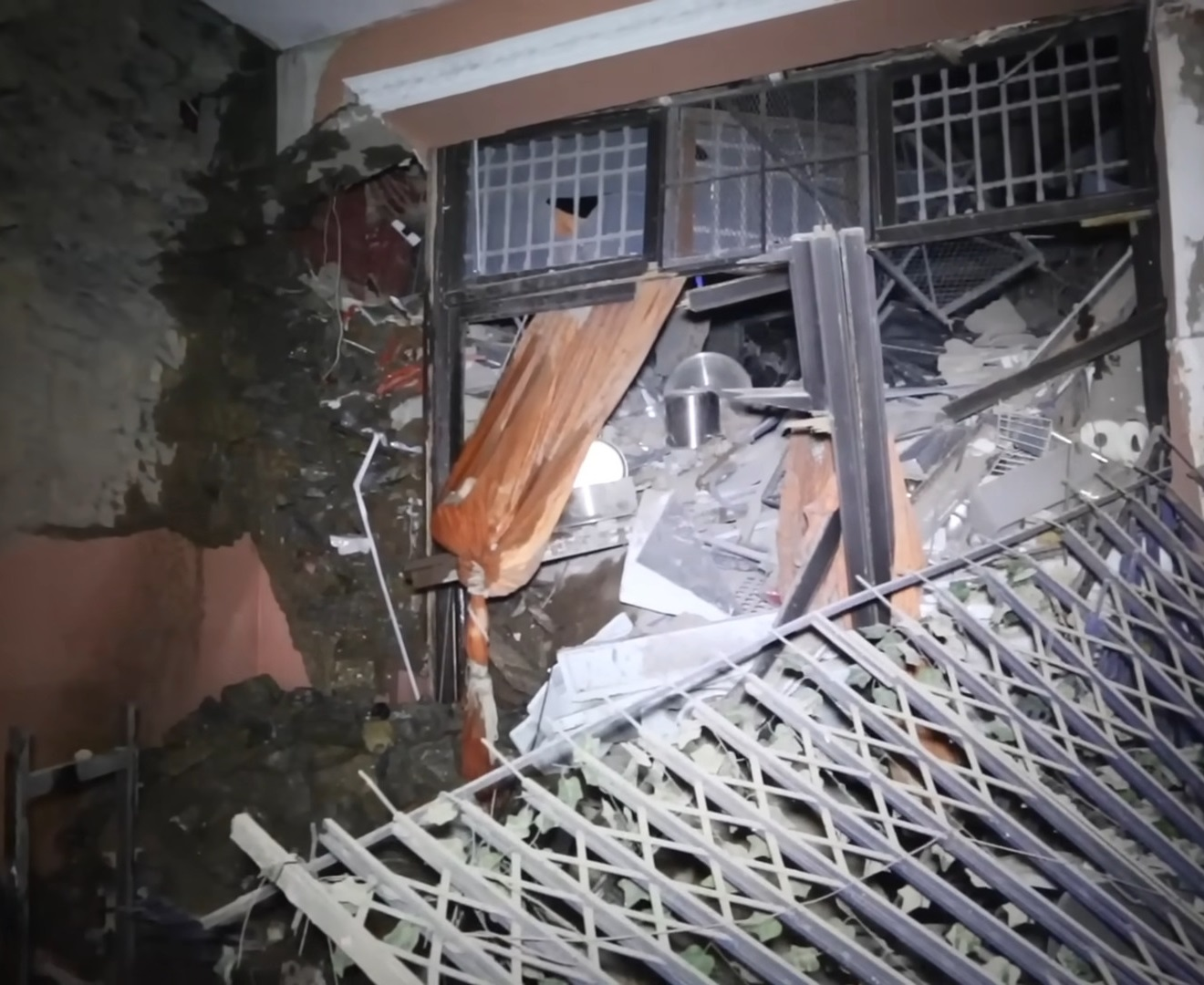

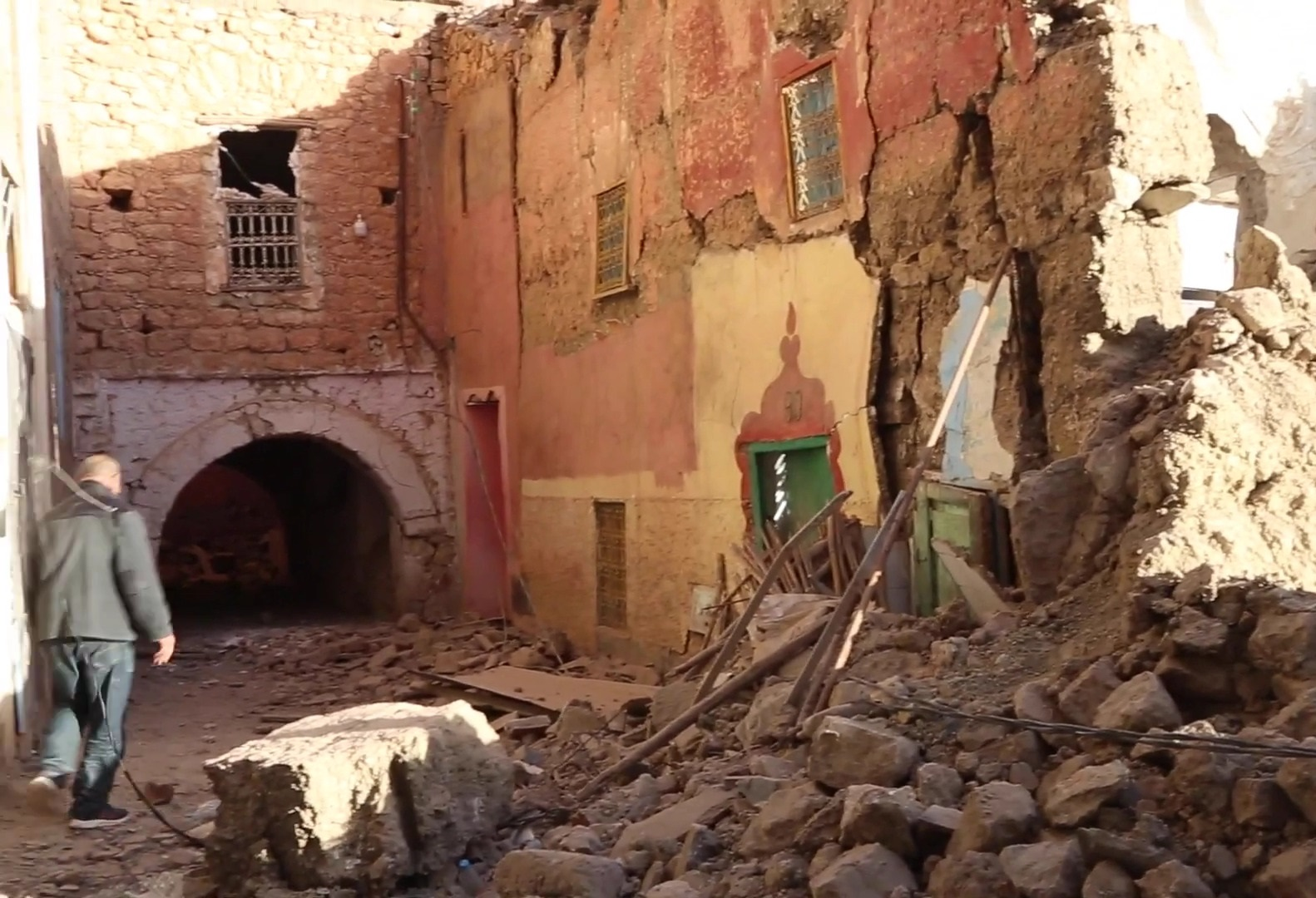

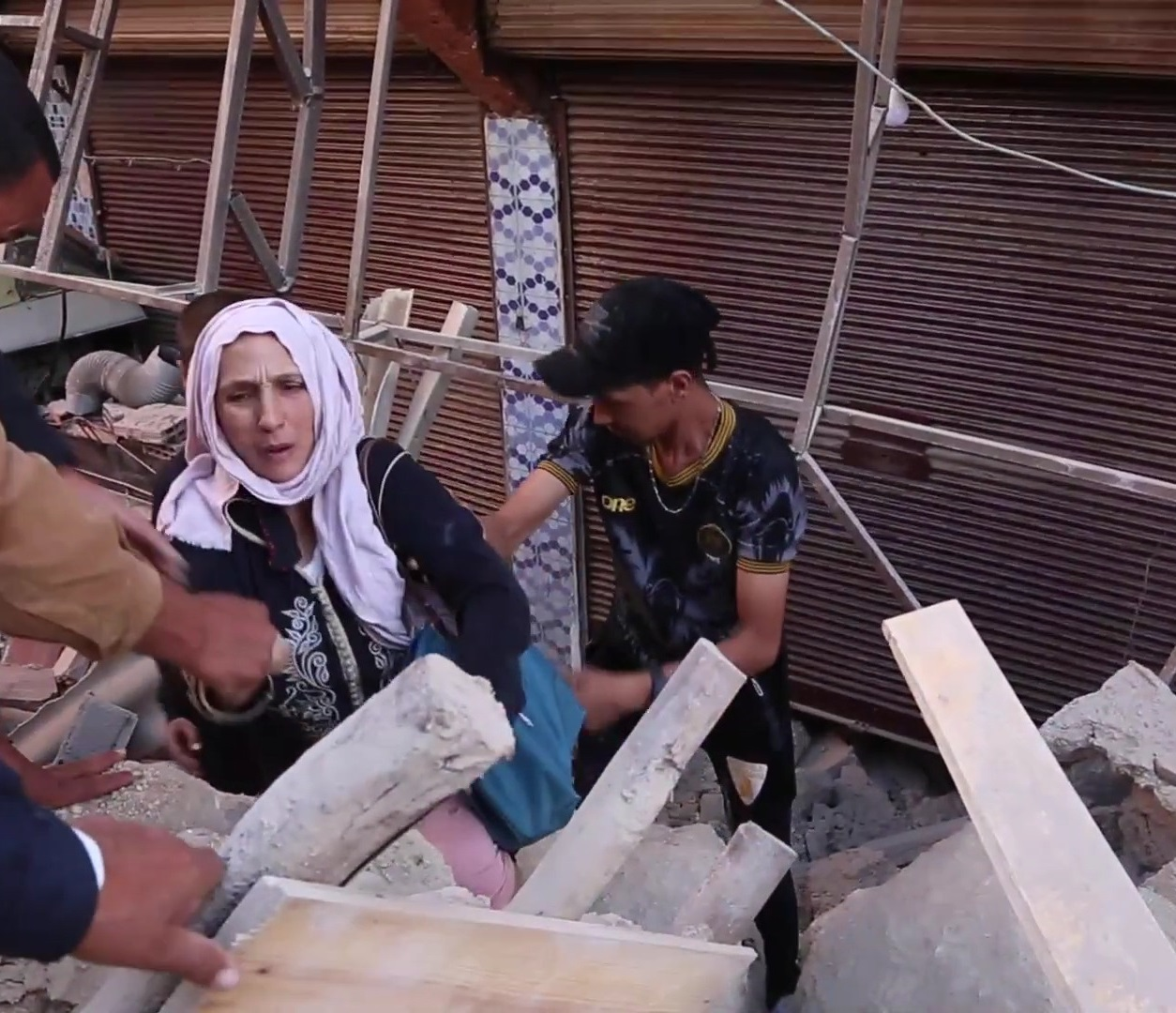

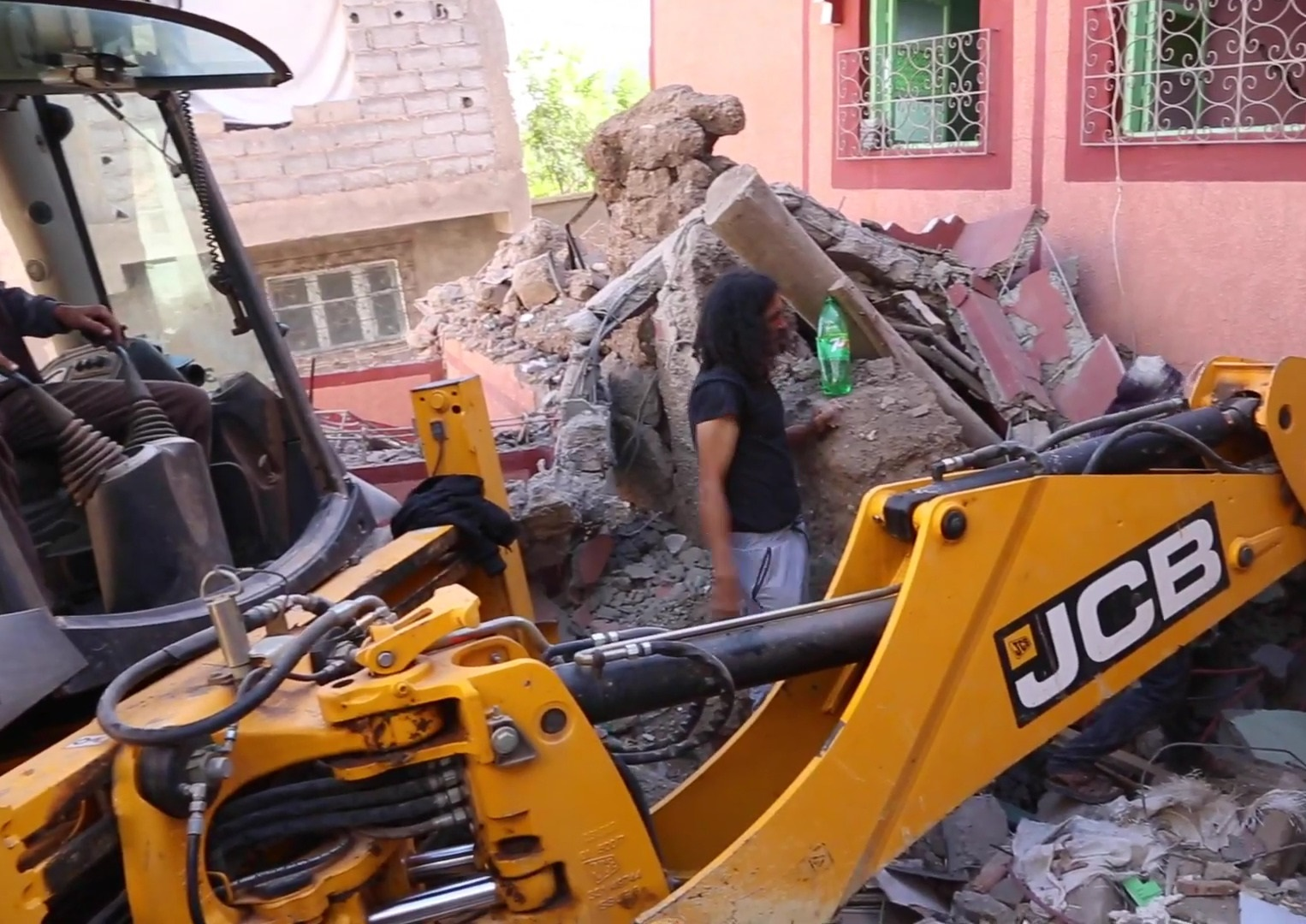

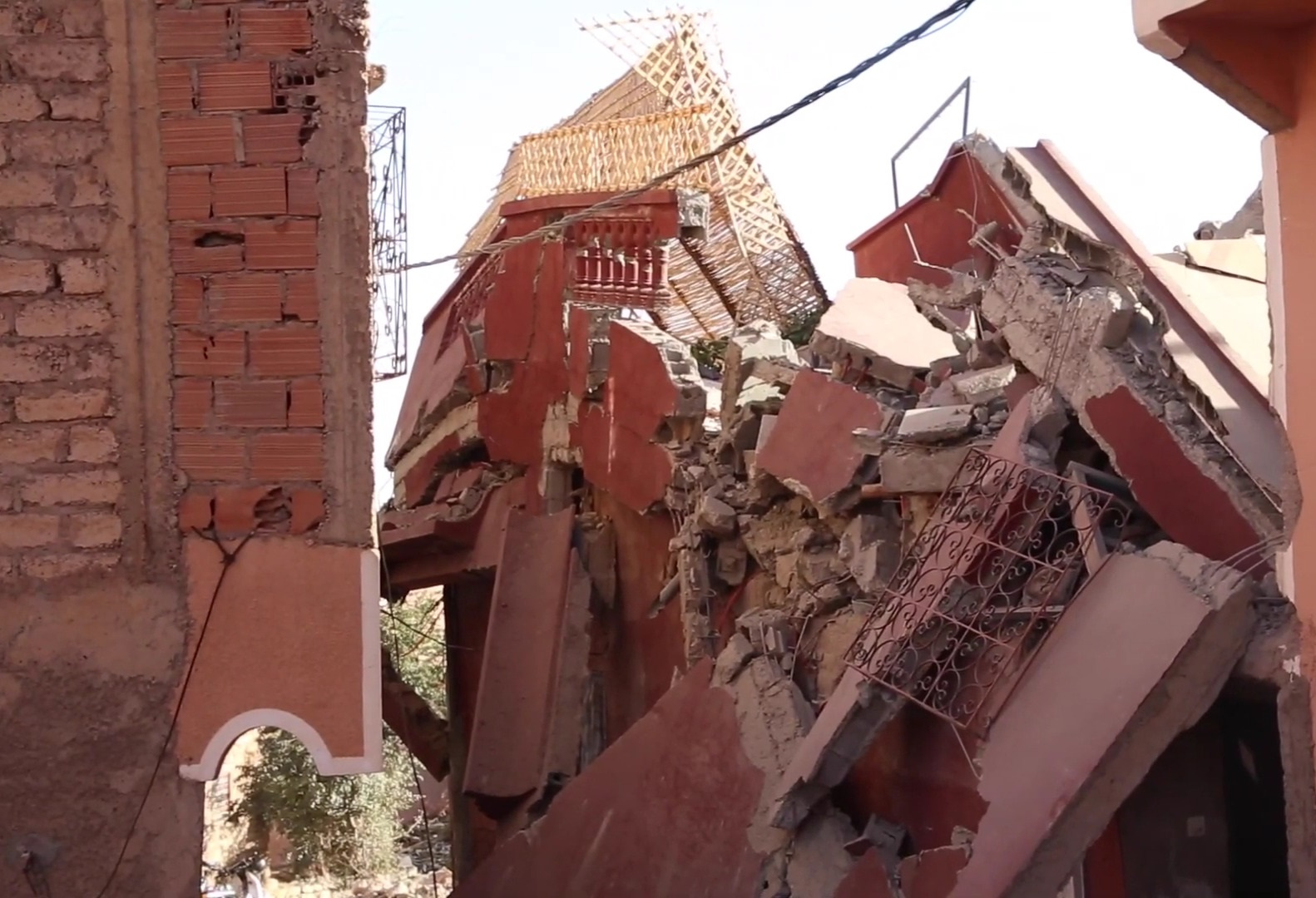

== Search and rescue ==
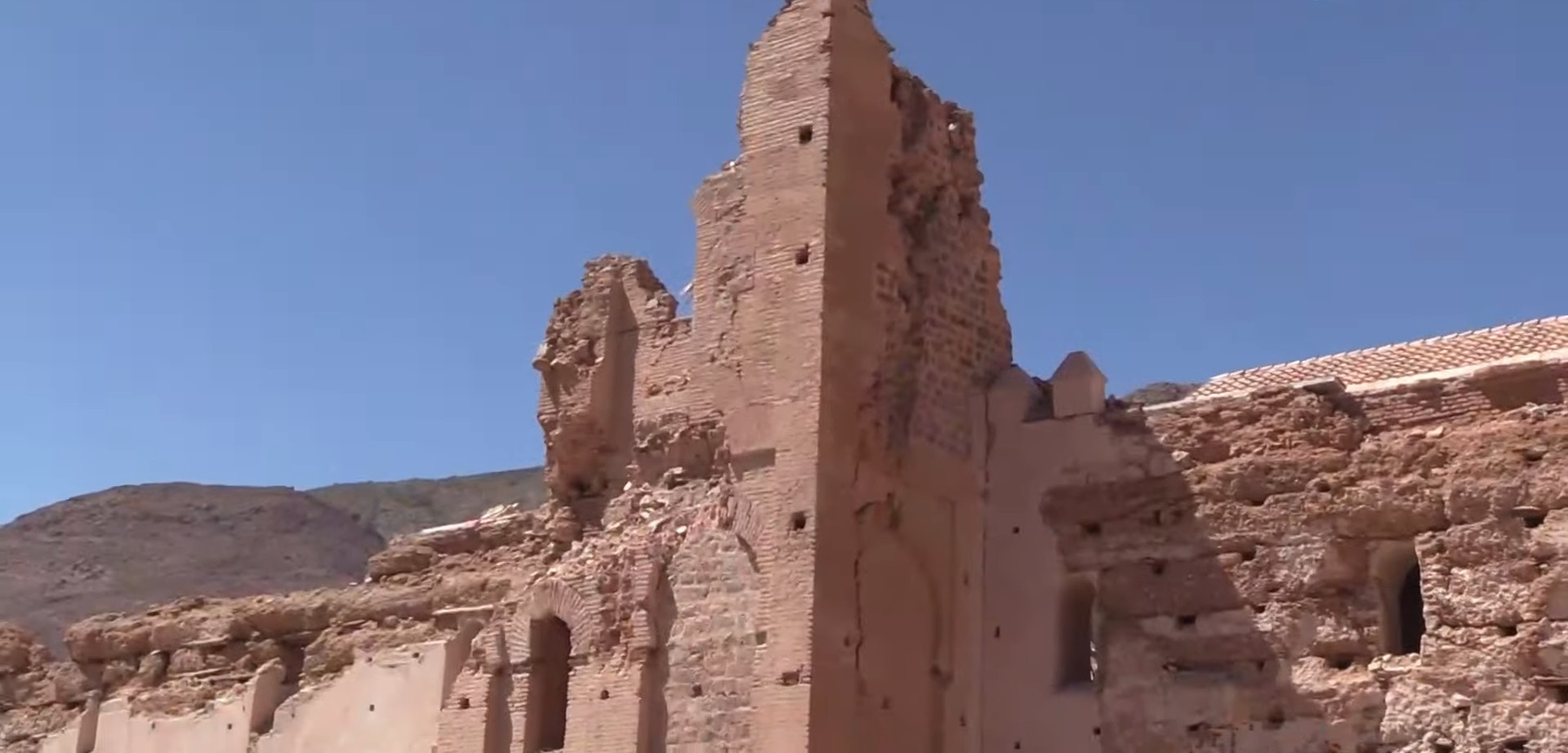
Ruins of the Tinmal Mosque

People in Marrakesh removed rubble by hand while awaiting heavy equipment. Many residents remained outdoors for fear of another earthquake. Posts on social media showed people evacuating a shopping centre, restaurants and apartment buildings. Residents of the city spent the first three nights outdoors; filling up roundabouts, car parks and a public square. Some businesses in the city reopened on 10 September as King Mohammed VI recommended commercial operations to continue. Unsafe portions of the city were sealed off by officials while tourists and locals continued to move about. In the capital, Rabat, 350 km (220 mi) north of the epicenter, and at Imsouane, a coastal town, residents left their homes.

The General Secretary of the Directorate General of Internal Affairs said officials and security teams assembled resources to supply aid and assess damage. The Moroccan army cleared one of the main roads to the worst-affected areas, allowing vital assistance to reach people. In Salé, trucks carried blankets, camp beds and lighting devices to the affected areas. Semi-trailers also carried supplies to reach these areas. Local channel 2M shared videos of emergency vehicles travelling along a dirt road. Rescue missions were disrupted as the roads through the mountainous region were congested with vehicles and fallen rocks. Collapsed buildings made from traditional mud brick, stone and rough wood complicated lowered the chances of survival as these materials disintegrated and amalgamated. The amalgamated rubble left limited air pockets for those trapped. In Al-Haouz Province, rocks were removed from roads to enable ambulances and aid to reach the affected areas. A highway in the Atlas Mountains, congested with ambulances, taxis and Red Cross members, was used to treat the injured; the severely wounded were transported to a hospital in Marrakesh. In remote areas that were difficult to access, the Royal Moroccan Armed Forces used helicopters to supply basic needs. The Moroccan Health Ministry mobilized more than 2,000 doctors and nurses to respond to the earthquake.

There was a surge in wounded people admitted to hospitals in Marrakesh. Injured people from outside Marrakesh also began to trickle into the city to get treatment. An appeal was made to the city's residents for blood donations. On the morning of 9 September, roughly 200 people, including tourists, visited a hospital to donate blood. Among those who donated were the Moroccan national football team. The initiative amassed 6,000 bags of blood within a day of the campaign launch. Damage assessments in Marrakesh revealed most of the city was relatively undamaged.

King Mohammed VI, who was reportedly in France at the time of the earthquake, authorised the deployment of the Royal Moroccan Army in various affected cities in order to help. He also declared three days of national mourning and ordered the creation of a relief commission to provide survivors with aid, and the opening of special bank accounts to allow donations. Following a meeting with the King on 11 September, Prime Minister Aziz Akhannouch, in his first remarks on the disaster, said that the government was committed to funding rebuilding and compensating those affected. King Mohammed VI also visited the Marrakesh University Hospital on 12 September, with state media saying that he met with earthquake victims and donated blood.

The Army set up a field hospital in Moulay Brahim. Rescue personnel used heavy equipment to recover survivors and bodies from debris. Survivors from the village began digging graves on a hill to bury the dead. A large tent was set-up in the village to house the homeless. Operations at Marrakesh Airport remained normal but two Ryanair flights from Marrakesh to Brussels and Beauvais, France, that were scheduled for 9 September were cancelled. British Airways replaced its regular aircraft to Marrakesh with a larger one to carry British nationals requesting repatriation.

== International response ==
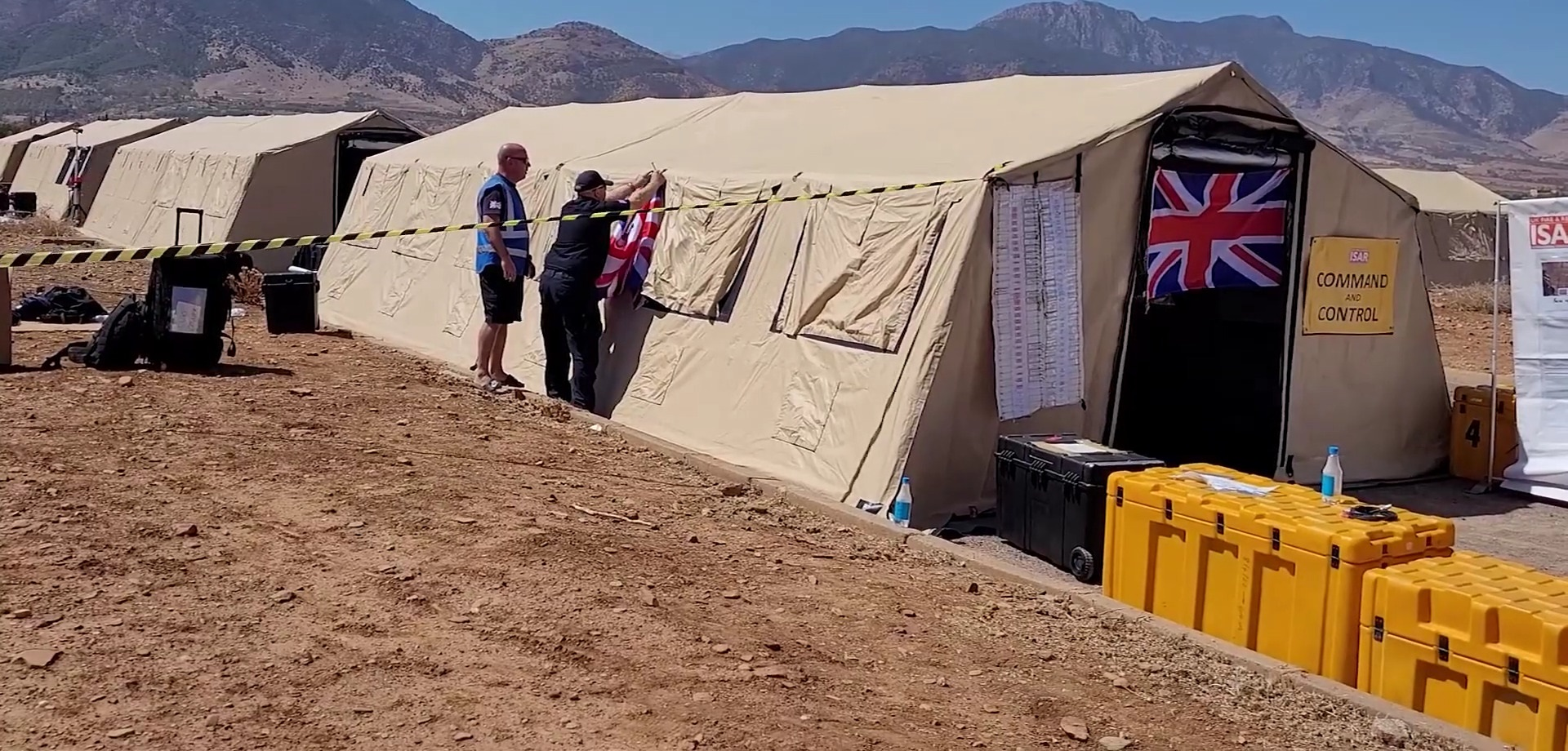
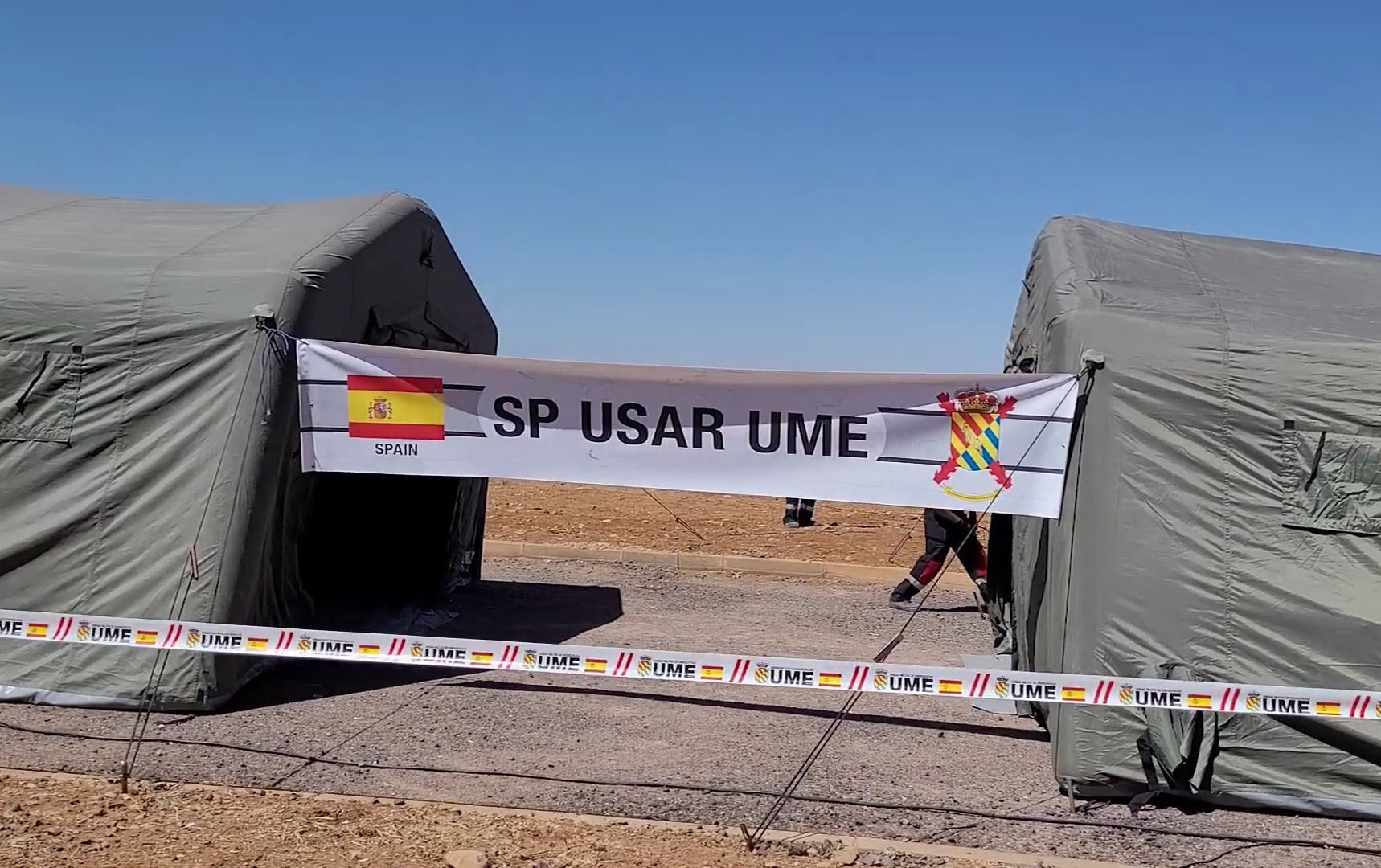
British and Spanish aid, 11 September.

The Netherlands released €5 million in emergency aid, while the Red Cross Society of China gave the Moroccan Red Crescent $200,000 for emergency humanitarian assistance. The European Commission pledged €1 million ($1.07 million) to support relief efforts. Aerospace company Boeing announced a $300,000-donation to the American Red Cross and CARE International. Other world leaders and heads of states offered condolences.

The 18-hour delay for King Mohammed VI to make an official announcement on the earthquake received criticism socially. There was also criticism of the government's delay in making an official request for assistance and that more external aid was not allowed. Frustration also grew among international aid groups on standby as they had not received formal requests. The Moroccan government did not formally ask for foreign assistance; however, they accepted aid from Qatar, Spain, United Arab Emirates, and the United Kingdom. Officials said they have only approved the offer of four countries because "a lack of coordination could be counterproductive". They added that other offers may be approved when there is a need. On 17 September, the king sent formal messages to representatives of the four countries' search and rescue teams, thanking them for their assistance.

Benoît Payan, the mayor of Marrakesh's sister city Marseille, France, announced that he was sending firefighters to Morocco to help with rescue operations. The President of the Regional Council of Île-de-France Valérie Pécresse sent $535,000 in aid. The French Embassy in Morocco opened a crisis unit hotline. A rescue crew was sent from Nice, while communities across the country offered more than €2 million ($2.1 million) in aid. The French government released €5 million ($5.4 million) in aid for NGOs operating in Morocco. Arnaud Fraisse, head of Secouristes Sans Frontières (Rescuers Without Borders), said its teams were prevented by Moroccan authorities from entering the country on 10 September. On 10 September, Minister for Digital Affairs Jean-Noël Barrot said that all French mobile phone operators had begun offering free calls and text messages to Morocco. In Belgium, a public memorial service for the victims of the earthquake was held in the city centre of Antwerp on 12 September, during which the Moroccan national anthem was played and a minute of silence for the dead was conducted. A six-man rescue team and four rescue dogs from De Rips in the Netherlands flew from Brussels to help in the search and rescue operations at the request of local residents. The town of Hilversum donated €20,000 to the victims. The Dutch Red Cross also launched a relief drive called Giro 6868 to help the victims, with about €3.8 million worth of aid being received. Norway, through the country's red cross, pledged NOK 10 million in aid to the victims.

Israeli Prime Minister Benjamin Netanyahu and King Abdullah II of Jordan ordered their governments to send aid to Morocco, while the United Arab Emirates's president Mohamed bin Zayed Al Nahyan ordered the establishment of an air bridge to transport relief aid and other support, as did Saudi Arabia. Sultan Haitham bin Tarik of Oman ordered rescue teams and medical aid to be sent to Morocco on 10 September. On 12 September, Egyptian President Abdel Fattah el-Sisi declared three days of national mourning for the victims of the earthquake and those of Storm Daniel in Libya on 10 and 11 September.

Algeria, for the first time since 2021, opened its airspace to Morocco to facilitate the arrival of humanitarian aid. The following day, they proposed an 80-member specialised civil protection intervention team. Spain placed its Military Emergencies Unit, its other aid agencies, and its embassy in Rabat at Morocco's disposal. Two Spanish Air Force aircraft carrying 86 soldiers and eight search dogs were flown to Marrakesh after the Moroccan government made a bilateral appeal. The Czech Republic announced it was ready to send about 70 members of a rescue team, including nine doctors, after receiving an official request from the Moroccan government. Czech Defense Minister Jana Černochová said three military planes were prepared to transport the team.

The International Charter on Space and Major Disasters was activated by the United Nations Institute for Training and Research on behalf of the International Federation of Red Cross and Red Crescent Societies to provide humanitarian satellite coverage. On 9 September, a team of 50 paramedics and personnel from Tunisia arrived. The team also brought search dogs, thermal imaging devices, a drone, and field hospital. A Qatari rescue team arrived in Morocco on 11 September. By 6 October, the Moroccan Red Crescent had supported over 50,000 people. They deployed over 290 volunteers across the affected provinces to assist in search and rescue efforts, preparing medical caravans and makeshift medical tents.

The Confederation of African Football postponed the qualifying match for the 2023 Africa Cup of Nations between Morocco and Liberia, which was due to be held in Agadir on 9 September. The qualifying match between the Republic of the Congo and The Gambia went ahead as scheduled in Marrakesh on 10 September. UEFA announced a moment of silence for the victims for all club and national team matches until 21 September.

UNESCO experts visited the Medina of Marrakesh on 9 September to take a first look at the damage. The organization said it would provide support according to the needs expressed, with Director General Audrey Azoulay specifying "whether it is a matter of surveying the damage in the fields of heritage and education, making buildings safe or preparing for reconstruction".

== Recovery and assistance ==
On 14 September, the monarchy announced that 50,000 houses had been damaged by the earthquake, and pledged shelter and 30,000 dirhams ($3,000) to affected households, as well as reconstruction aid of 140,000 dirhams for collapsed homes and 80,000 for damaged ones. These payouts were processed via monthly instalments. The prime minister issued a statement stating that 63,800 households were actively receiving the monthly payouts of 2,500 dirhams ($257). The King also conferred the status of "Wards of the Nation" to all children orphaned by the earthquake.

The Red Cross announced the recovery process could take years; several villages near the epicenter in the remote mountainous region were completely flattened and/or inaccessible, with the paucity of infrastructure such railways, roads, and hospitals vis-à-vis the north of the country hampering relief efforts.

On 20 September, a five-year-long rehousing plan estimated at US$11.7 billion was announced after a discussion with King Mohammed VI, army and government personnel. It was projected to benefit 4.2 million people in the provinces of Al-Haouz, Chichaoua, Taroudant, Marrakech, Ouarzazate and Azilal. Besides rehousing, the project also aims to promote social and economic growth in the region through improved infrastructure. The government's budget, international assistance and a reserve scheme would supply the funds needed for the project. The country promised to provide aid of US$14,000 and $8,000 for collapsed and damaged homes, respectively. Compensation of US$38,000 and $21,000 would be provided for totally destroyed and partially destroyed homes, respectively. The government would also provide monthly support over a year of US$244 to affected families. By January 2024, the government said around 57,600 families had received the monthly support and more than 44,000 households received reconstruction aid.

During the Annual Meetings of the International Monetary Fund and the World Bank Group held in Marrakesh, Morocco and Spain agreed on lending €11.6 million to support the reconstruction campaign. The United Kingdom's Foreign, Commonwealth and Development Office also added it would provide £1.45 million to address the immediate needs and long-term recovery. Financial assistance would target healthcare, shelter and the local agriculture industry.

== Aid and crisis management ==
=== International aid ===
Offers of assistance flooded in from countries and organisations including the United States, France, Turkey, the European Commission, the African Union, the International Monetary Fund, and Algeria, which maintains tumultuous relations with Morocco. Despite many offers to assist, Morocco only officially accepted aid from four countries—Spain, the United Kingdom, Qatar, and the United Arab Emirates. The president of the NGO Secouristes sans frontières, Arnaud Fraisse, stated, "We do not understand this situation of blocking on the part of the Moroccan government. There is no explanation at the moment." The Lebanese newspaper L'Orient-Le Jour declared Morocco, "despite being wounded, is snubbing international aid", forcing local officials to organise assistance.

On 11 September, Algeria prepared three planes equipped with all the necessary medication and food supplies, along with a team of 93 rescuers. This came after Justice Minister Abdellatif Ouahbi's statement on television affirming that Algeria's aid was favorable and that coordination with the Moroccan Ministry of Foreign Affairs was required. Shortly after, the Moroccan press criticised Ouahbi's behavior, prompting him to clarify a few hours later that his statements had been misunderstood and misinterpreted. The aid was refused as Morocco informed the Algerian Consul in Casablanca that they did not need the proposed assistance.

In contrast, Israeli NGOs provided aid upon arrival in Morocco without official approval from the Moroccan or Israeli governments. On 14 September, a scheduled German Red Cross flight from Leipzig to Morocco was suddenly suspended just before takeoff. In a statement, the organization said: "for reasons beyond our control and that of our partners in the Red Cross and Red Crescent movement." The flight carrying aid, tents and mats was requested by the Moroccan Red Crescent.

In response to these observations, the Moroccan Interior Ministry said on 10 September that its selective acceptance of aid was "based on a precise assessment of needs on the ground" but not an outright rejection of such offers.

=== Crisis management ===
The Spanish newspaper El Mundo criticised the delayed reaction of King Mohammed VI as he remained "silent for hours after the tragedy". The newspaper on the other hand quoted the French ambassador in Morocco, Christophe Lecourtier, who justified the delay by stating that "the Moroccan authorities were conducting an evaluation of the situation", since "the southern region was isolated and far from urban centres". This statement was echoed by spokesperson of the French Ministry of Foreign Affairs, Anne-Claire Legendre, who added that "the needs must be established prior to making a request for help".

Another Spanish daily, El País, found the king's "silence" in the face of the tragedy "disturbing". L'Humanité expressed concern over the "dangerous inertia of Moroccan power". Having been in Paris since 1 September for medical reasons, he returned to Rabat on 9 September, where images showed him in a working meeting.

=== Protests ===
On 25 October 2023, hundreds of people took to the streets of Amizmiz, one of the worst-hit towns, to protest against local and regional authorities over delays in the delivery of emergency aid and cash support for the affected families. The protests, arranged by the Amizmiz Earthquake Victims' Coordination, came after a worker's strike and repeated storms that had further worsened living conditions for the residents. After a meeting with local officials, the organization called off the demonstration, but many people still went ahead with the protests. Many families had also not received cash support which was promised by the government despite providing their contact details. They were also concerned about housing as winter was approaching. In January 2024, protests were held in Talat N'Yaaqoub and in Taroudant Province over delays in the delivery of financial relief. Another protest broke out in the town in late August over the slow rebuilding efforts, lack of state investment and social assistance.

In 2025, Said Ait Mehdi, a prominent activist for survivors and leading member of the protests, was sentenced to a year in prison on grounds of spreading fake news and a defamation suit by local officials. The initial sentence of three months was lengthened by the Moroccan appeals court.

=== Reconstruction ===
A year later, Middle East Eye reported that many residents were still living in makeshift tents, guesthouses or with their relatives. Ruins in some localities close to the epicenter have also not been cleared. Reuters said that of the 55,000 new homes planned, only 1,000 had been completed. Elmahdi Benabdeljalil, chairperson of the independent group Amal Biladi, criticised the government's reconstruction process. The government selected a "supervised self-construction", where recipients are paid funds in installments to source their own method of rebuilding. This system involves an architect laying the blueprints for a new home; residents can build these homes themselves or hire others. These residents have complained that a shortage in workers, construction materials, cost of materials and labour, and inaccessibility to some sites has made reconstruction difficult. Furthermore, some residents did not receive their payouts while their neighbours have. The National Agency for Public Facilities is responsible for rebuilding public infrastructure, including over 500 schools and healthcare centers in the affected regions. In Ait Bourd, Amal Biladi helped constructing 20 noualas, a type of earthquake-resistant and insulated temporary home. Benabdeljalil said they aimed to complete another 30 noualas by the end of 2024. Some architects and authorities debated the use of concrete over traditional earth and stone for reconstruction. Those architects argued that concrete homes presented ecological problems, departed from tradition and were costlier. They added that traditional earth and stone were earthquake-resistant and criticised the rushed nature of reconstruction. Some traditionally constructed homes that could be repaired were totally demolished to be rebuilt again. The Amazigh people who reside in damaged villages across the High Atlas accused authorities of preventing them from building their homes with cement to preserve the historic value of their traditional clay and mud homes.

== See also ==
- Lists of 21st-century earthquakes
- List of earthquakes in 2023
- List of earthquakes in Morocco
- 2003 Boumerdès earthquake
