= Moulay Brahim, Morocco =

Moulay Brahim
- Rural commune and town
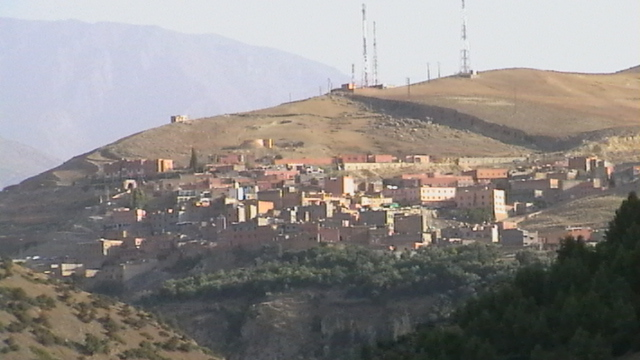
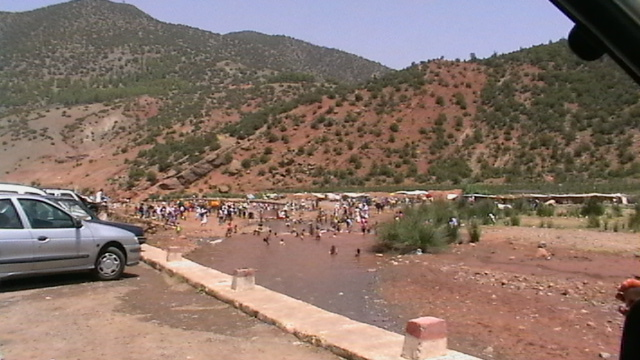
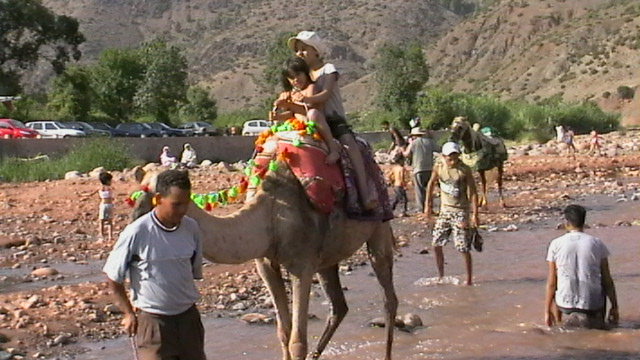
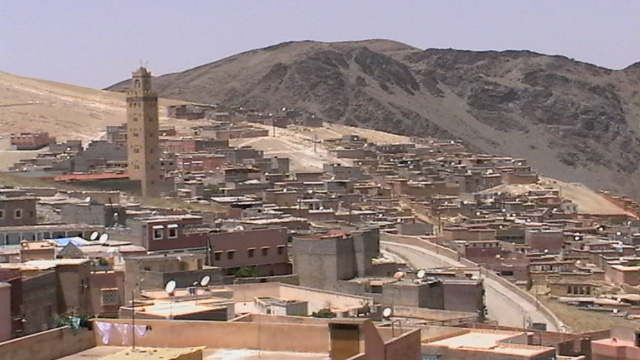
- Interactive map of Moulay Brahim
- Coordinates: 31°17′9″N 7°57′56″W
- Country: Morocco
- Region: Marrakesh-Safi
- Province: Al Haouz Province

Population (2014)
  - Total: 8,698
- Time zone: UTC+0 (GMT)

Moulay Brahim, or My Brahim, is a small town and rural commune in Al Haouz Province of the Marrakesh-Safi region of Morocco. At the time of the 2014 census, the commune had a total population of 8698 people; the town itself had a population of 3098. The town is named after the Moroccan sufi saint Moulay Brahim.

== History ==
On 8 September 2023, an earthquake with a magnitude of 6.8 M_{w}, struck the town which led to many homes collapsing.

Earthquake aftermath in Moulay Brahim

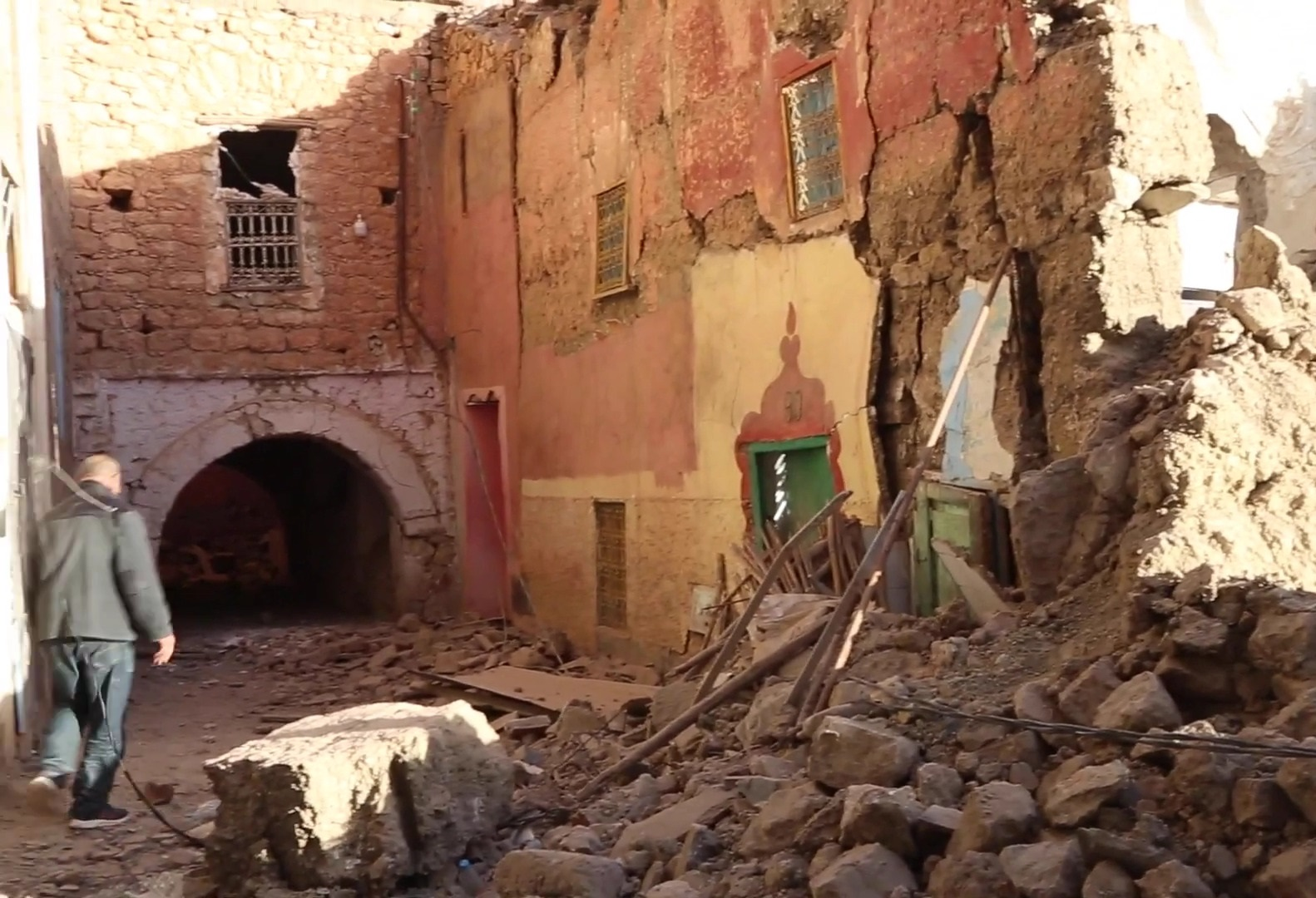

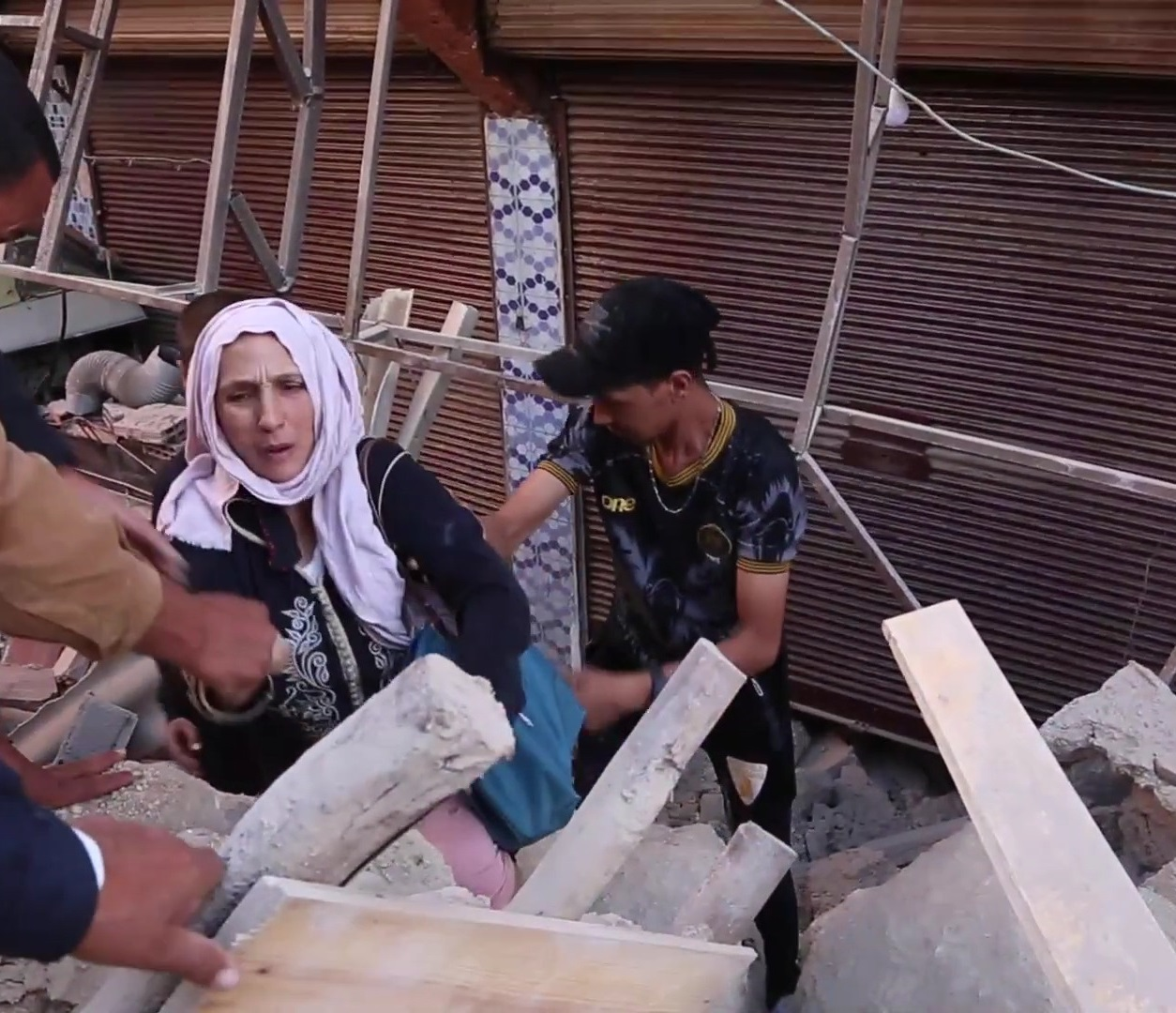

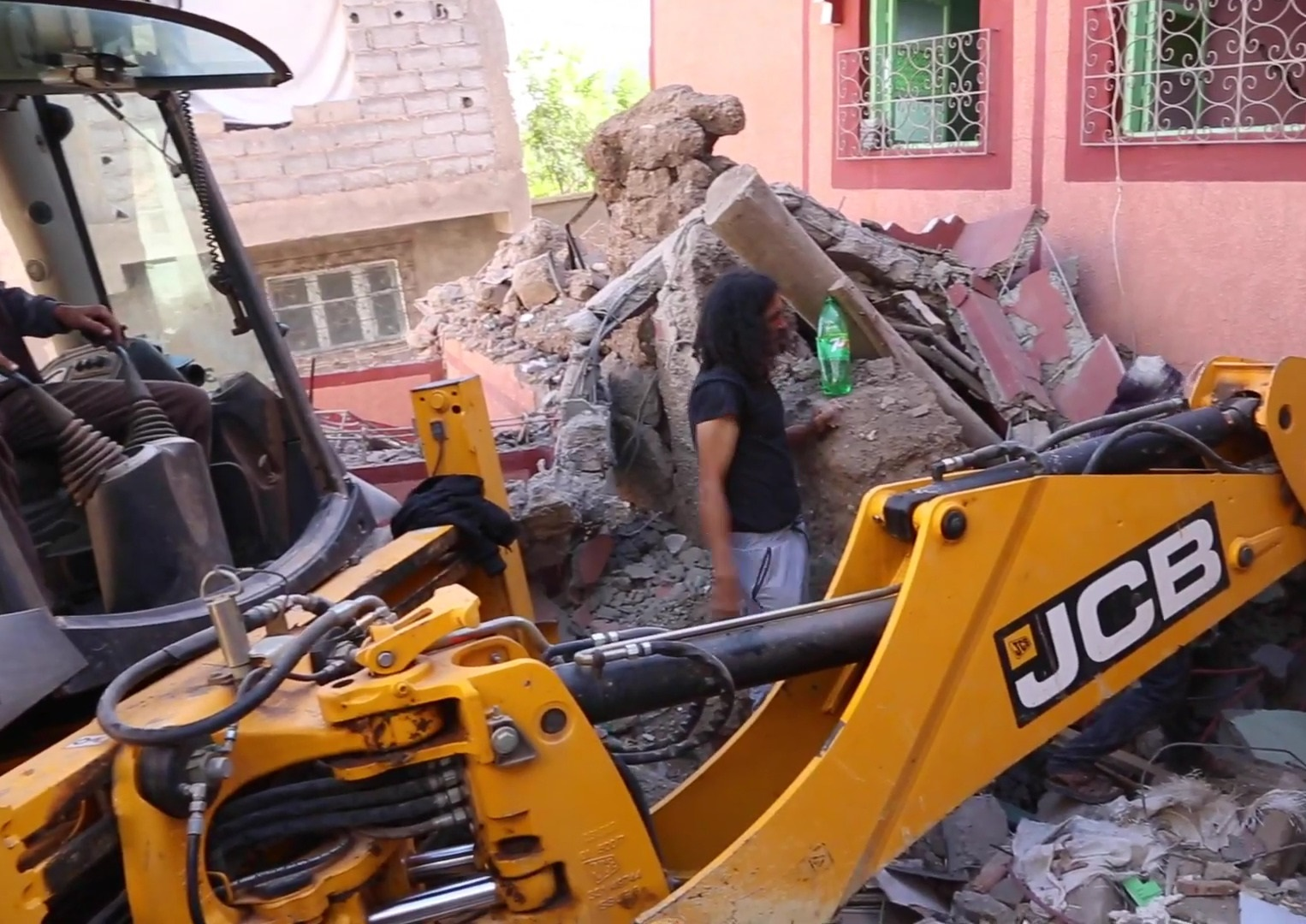

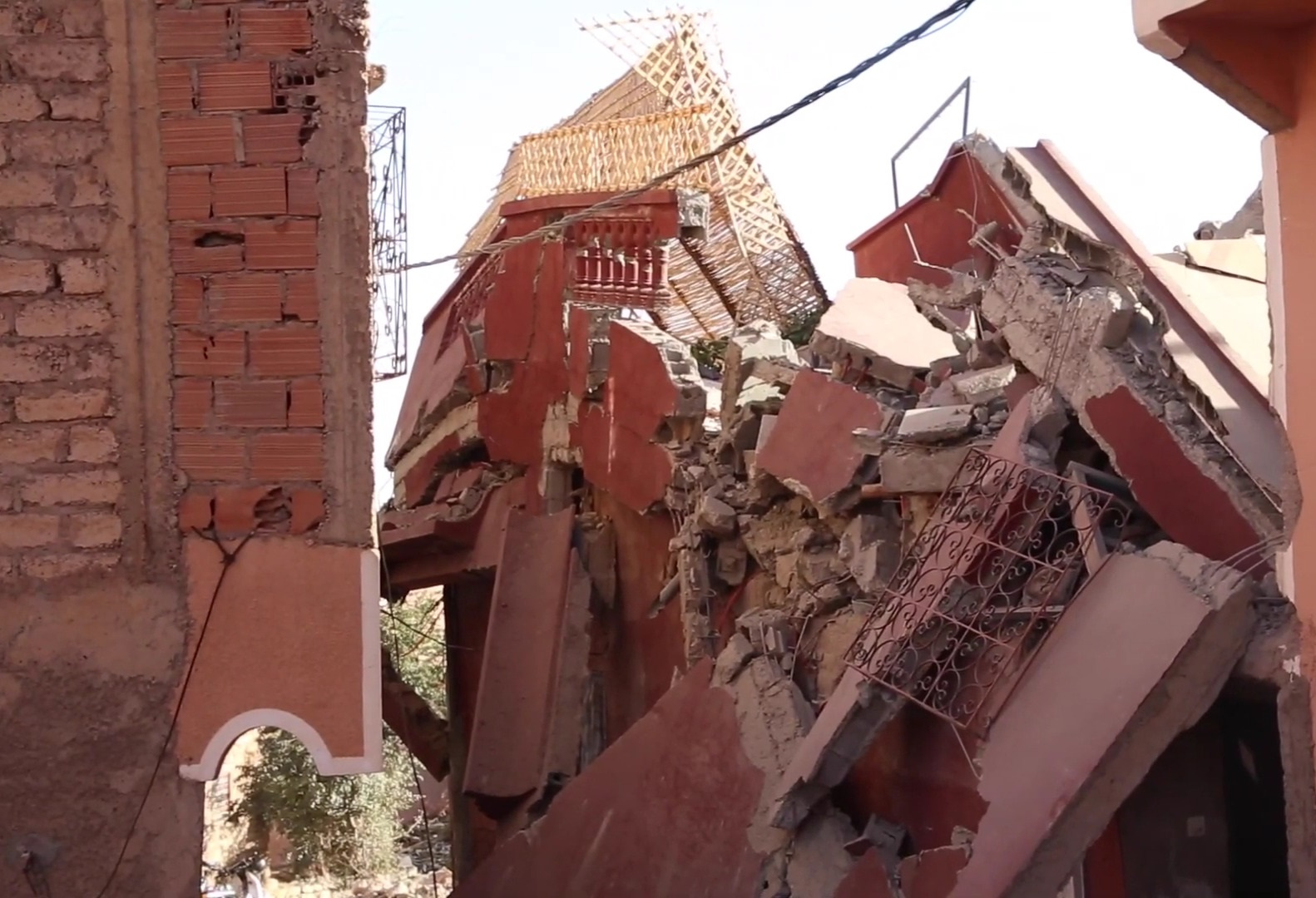
