= Imlil, Al Haouz =

Imlil
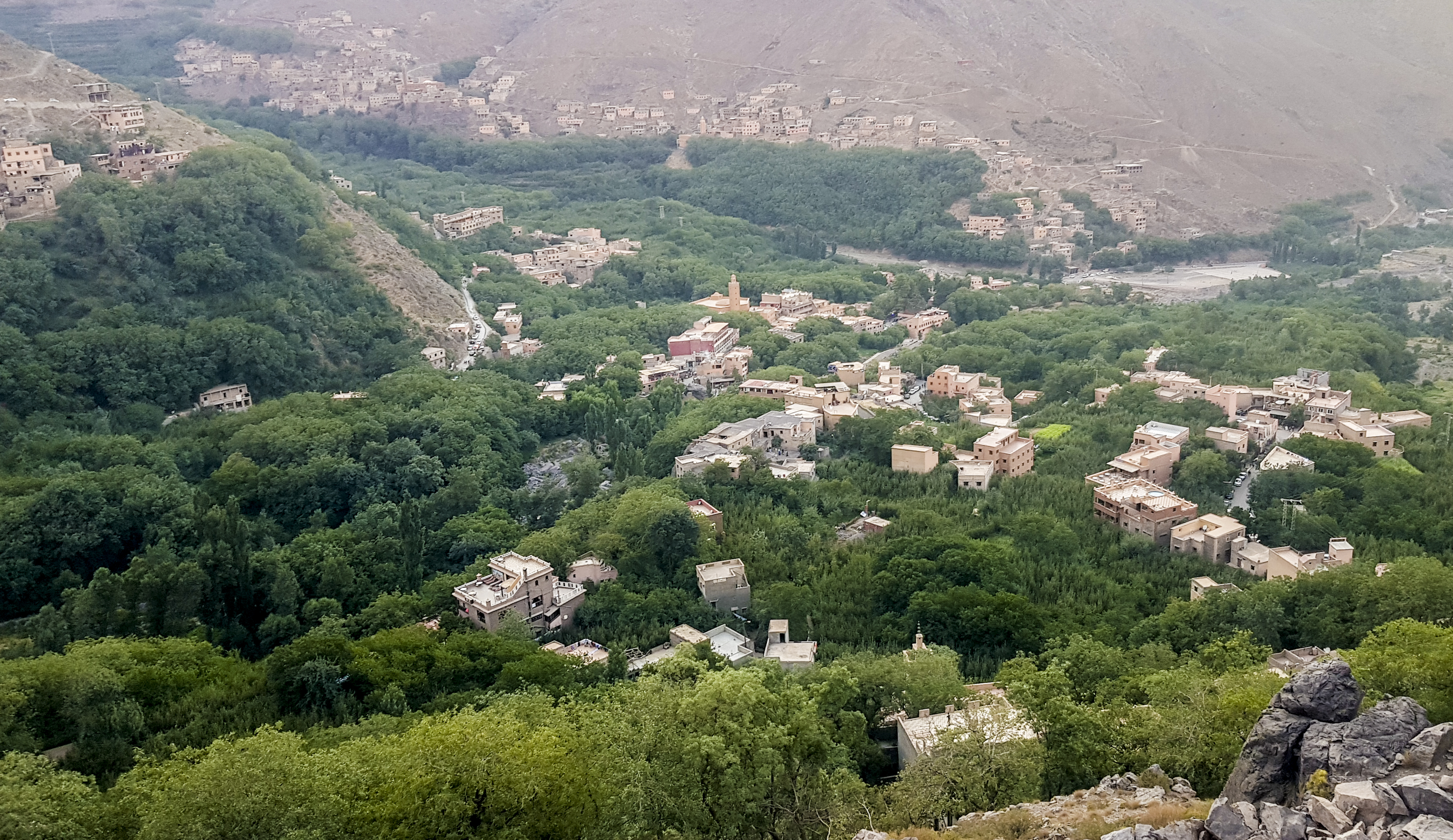
- Interactive map of Imlil
- Coordinates: 31.126372°N 7.917829°W
- Country: Morocco
- Region: Marrakesh-Safi
- Province: Al Haouz Province
- Commune: Asni

Population (2004)
  - Total: 8,843
- Time zone: UTC+0 (GMT)

Imlil (Arabic: إمليل; Berber languages: ⵉⵎⵍⵉⵍ) is a small village in the high Atlas Mountains of Morocco. It is 1,800 metres (5,900 ft) above sea level. It is close to mount Toubkal, the highest peak in Northern Africa. Imlil makes a good base for attempting to summit Toubkal as it lies at the end of the tarmac road, and is a natural place to hire mountain guides and mules for the onward trek. Imlil is the centre of mountain tourism in Morocco due to its unique position. From here, 90% of visitors head up to Toubkal, the highest mountain in Morocco.

Located in Al Haouz Province ~50km south of Marrakesh, Imlil is connected to Asni and Ikkiss by road, and shared taxis and mini buses provide services to them both. Asni is the closest town to Imlil and is where the weekly Saturday market is held.

Imlil as a village is a relatively new creation. It was created to cater for the number of tourists pouring through en route to Toubkal. The original communities still exist in the valleys around Tamatert, Ait Souka, Tagadirt, Tacheddirt, Acheim, Taourirt n'Ait Mizane, Mzikene and Arhrene.

Before the advent of mountain tourism, the Imlil area was well known for its walnuts, apples and cherry production. While these are still important to the local economy, these have been eclipsed by tourism. Both mountain tourists and Moroccans come to Imlil seeking a cool relief from the heat of the Haouz.

The film Seven Years in Tibet was partly shot in the village.

On 17 December 2018, two trekkers Louisa Vesterager Jespersen from Denmark and Maren Ueland from Norway, were murdered near to the village by Islamic terrorists who had pledged allegiance to ISIS. At least one victim was beheaded, with the murders videoed and posted to social media.

== 1995 flooding ==
On 17 August 1995, following 70 millimetres (2.8 in) of rainfall in just 2.5 hours, the village of Imlil was catastrophically flooded. A six-metre wall of water washed down the surrounding valleys, with a reported 27 times the average volume of water. Official figures state that up to 150 people, including 20-60 tourists, were killed. Forty vehicles parked near the river were washed away. The villagers experienced significant losses to food stocks and agricultural lands, as well as a depleted tourist industry over the proceeding months. The Moroccan government was quick to help, however, clearing access to the village through the blocked mountain road just four days later. By 2000 the village had still not returned to normal, with large areas of previously cultivated land still buried under flood debris. Many of their walnut trees were also washed away in the flood, each having taken up to 15 years to mature. This loss has still not been accounted for.

== Climate ==
The climate in Imlil is continental mediterranean (Köppen: Dsb) with high diurnal temperature variations, cold and snowy winters (wet season) and hot, dry summers with cool nights.

Climate data for Imlil
Month	Jan	Feb	Mar	Apr	May	Jun	Jul	Aug	Sep	Oct	Nov	Dec	Year
Mean daily maximum °C (°F)	11.6 (52.9)	13.0 (55.4)	15.6 (60.1)	18.6 (65.5)	22.1 (71.8)	26.1 (79.0)	31.1 (88.0)	30.6 (87.1)	26.5 (79.7)	20.4 (68.7)	15.0 (59.0)	11.4 (52.5)	20.2 (68.3)
Mean daily minimum °C (°F)	−3.3 (26.1)	−1.7 (28.9)	0.7 (33.3)	2.9 (37.2)	5.8 (42.4)	8.9 (48.0)	11.9 (53.4)	12.8 (55.0)	10.0 (50.0)	6.1 (43.0)	1.6 (34.9)	−1.9 (28.6)	4.5 (40.1)
Average precipitation mm (inches)	62 (2.4)	61 (2.4)	74 (2.9)	72 (2.8)	39 (1.5)	16 (0.6)	4 (0.2)	5 (0.2)	21 (0.8)	47 (1.9)	69 (2.7)	71 (2.8)	541 (21.3)
Source: Climate-data.org

== Photo Gallery ==
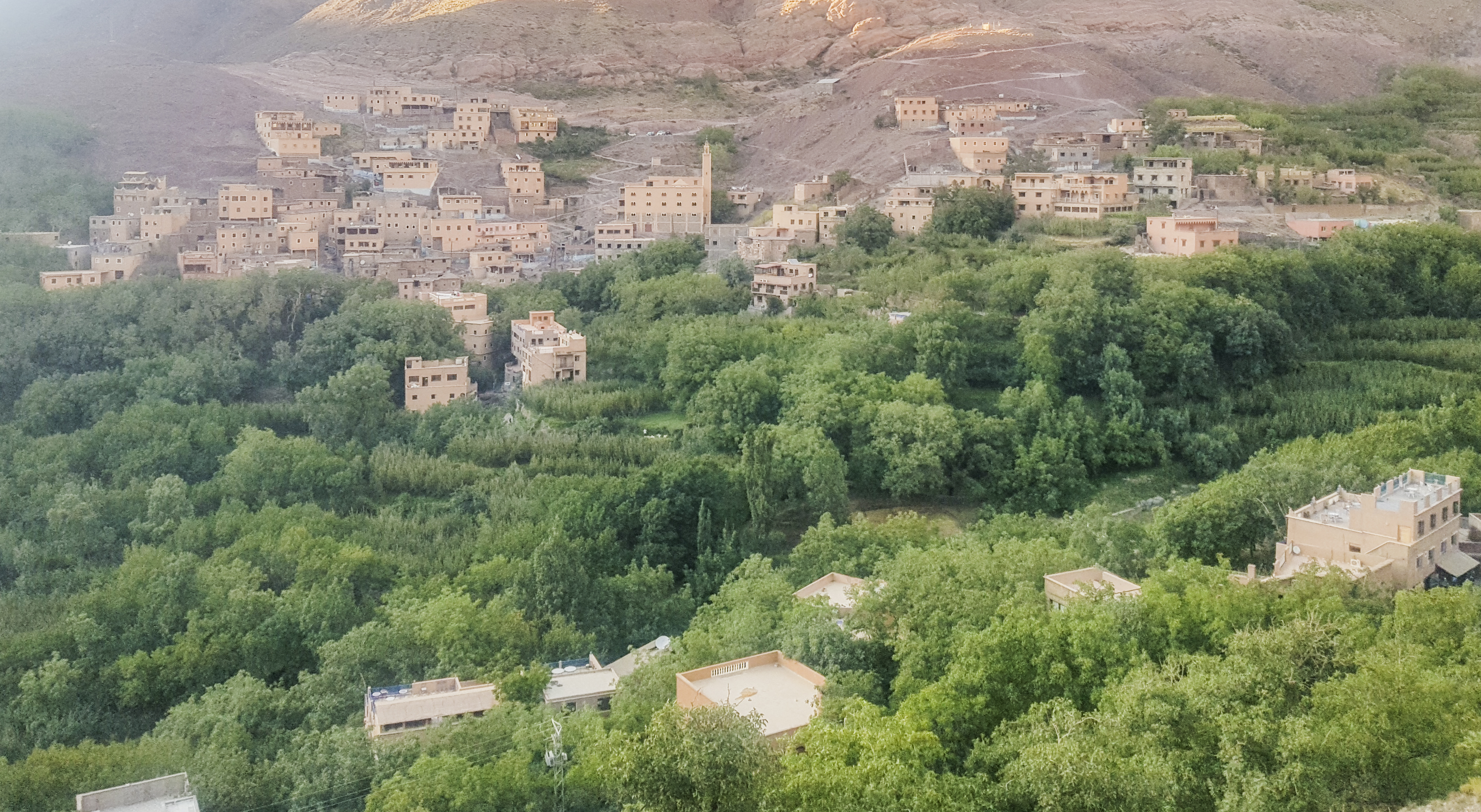
Imlil Village

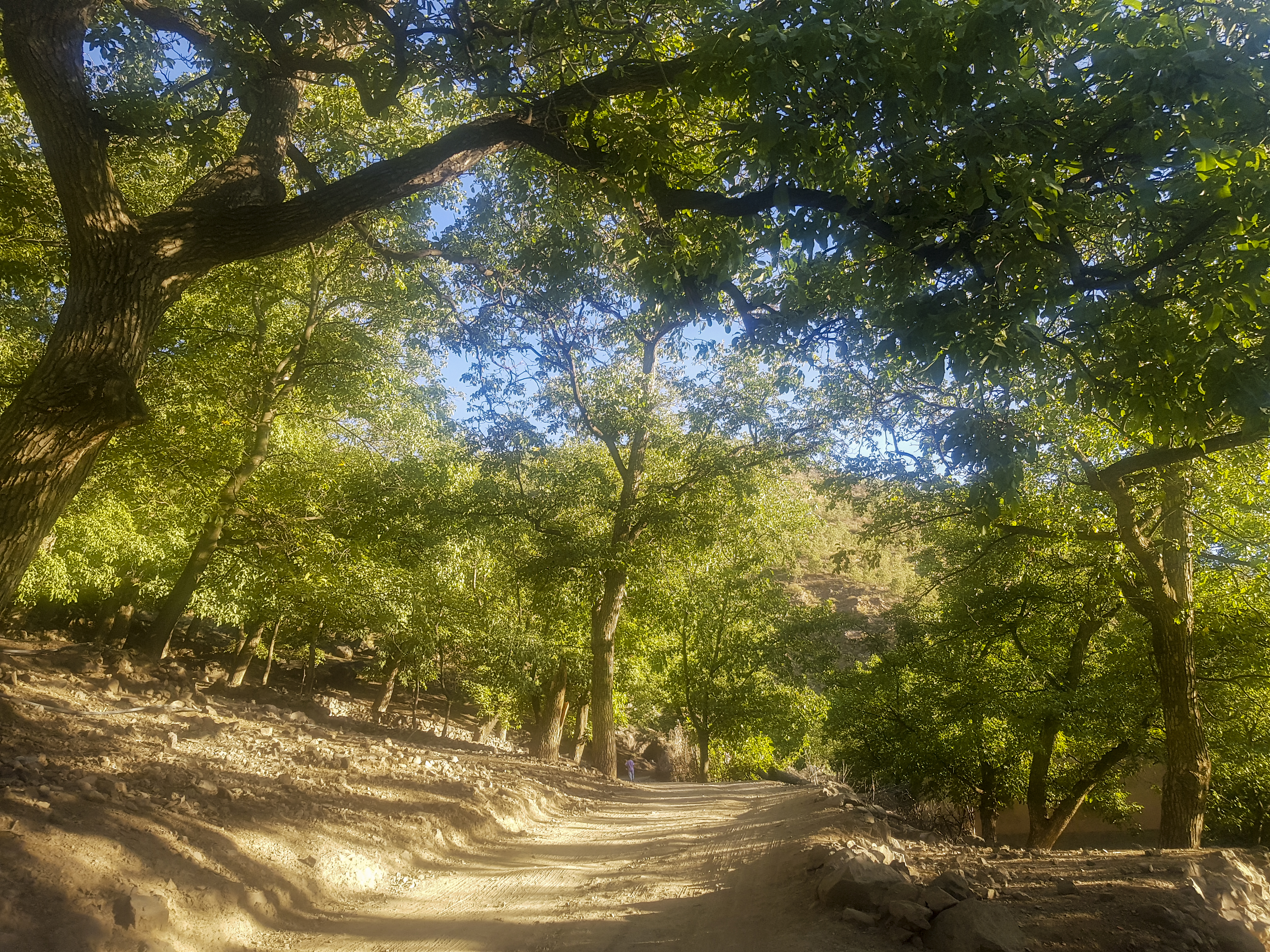
Noyers from Imlil Village

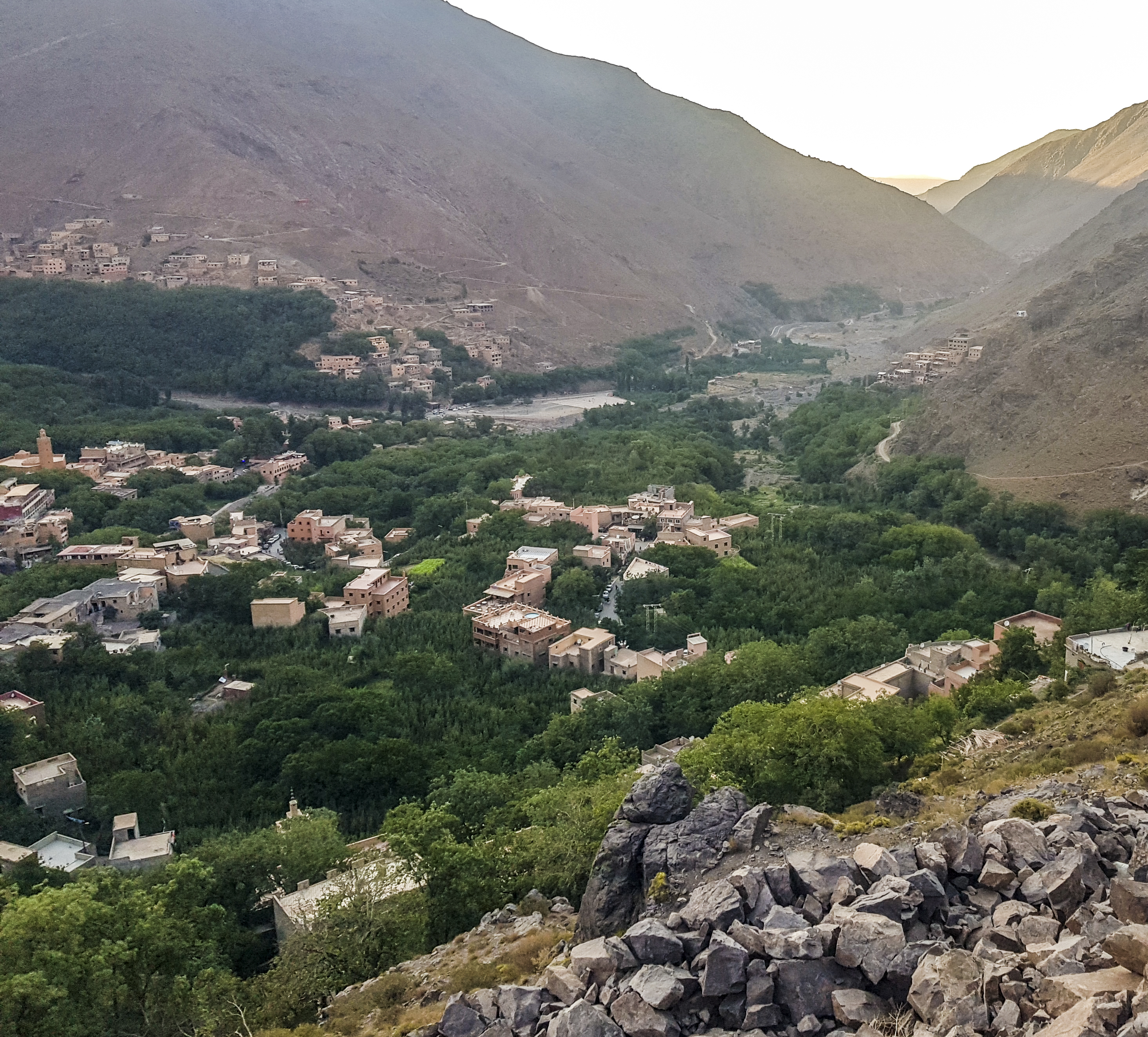
Imlil village

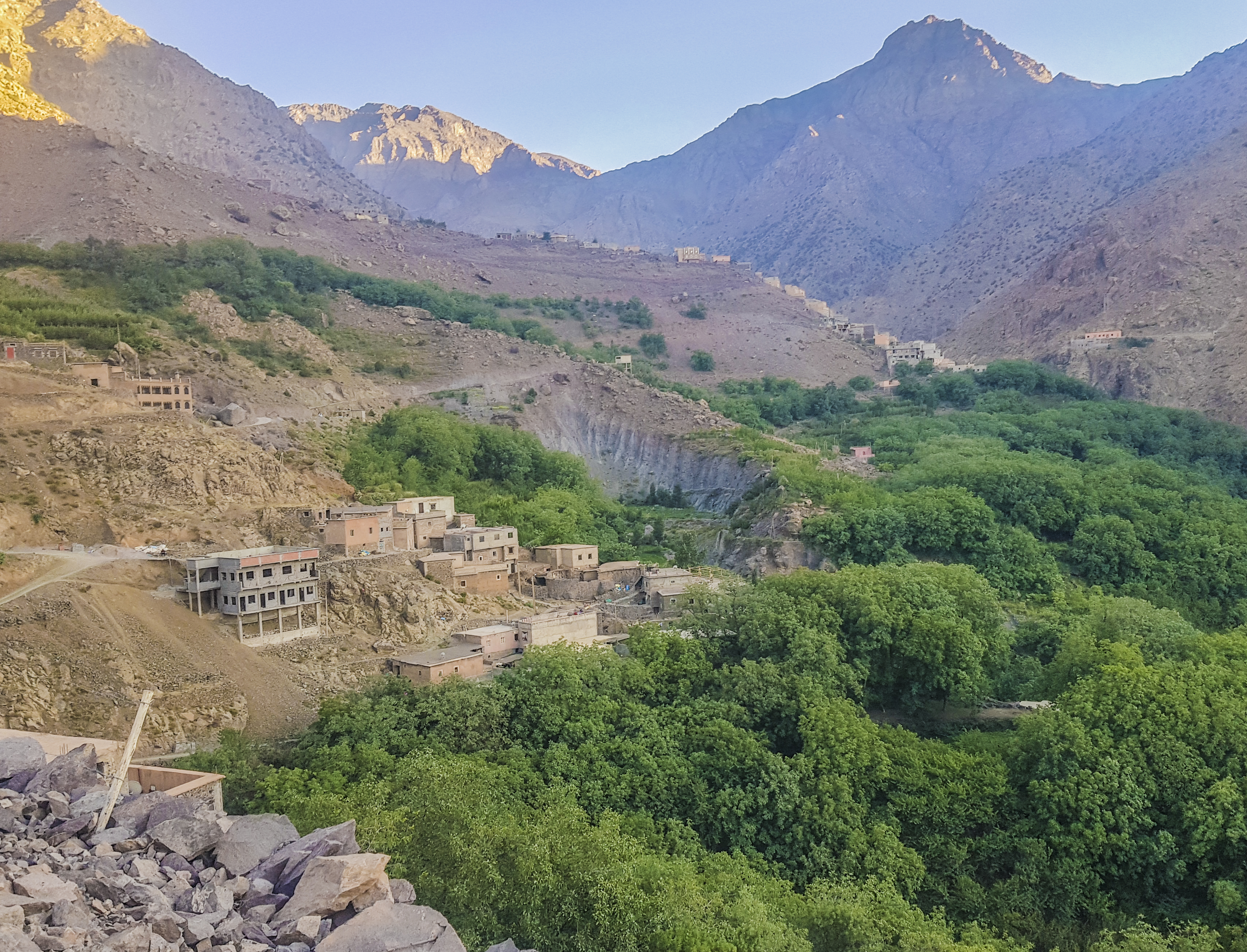
Imlil village
