= Asni =

Asni أسني ⴰⵙⵏⵉ
- Town and rural Commune
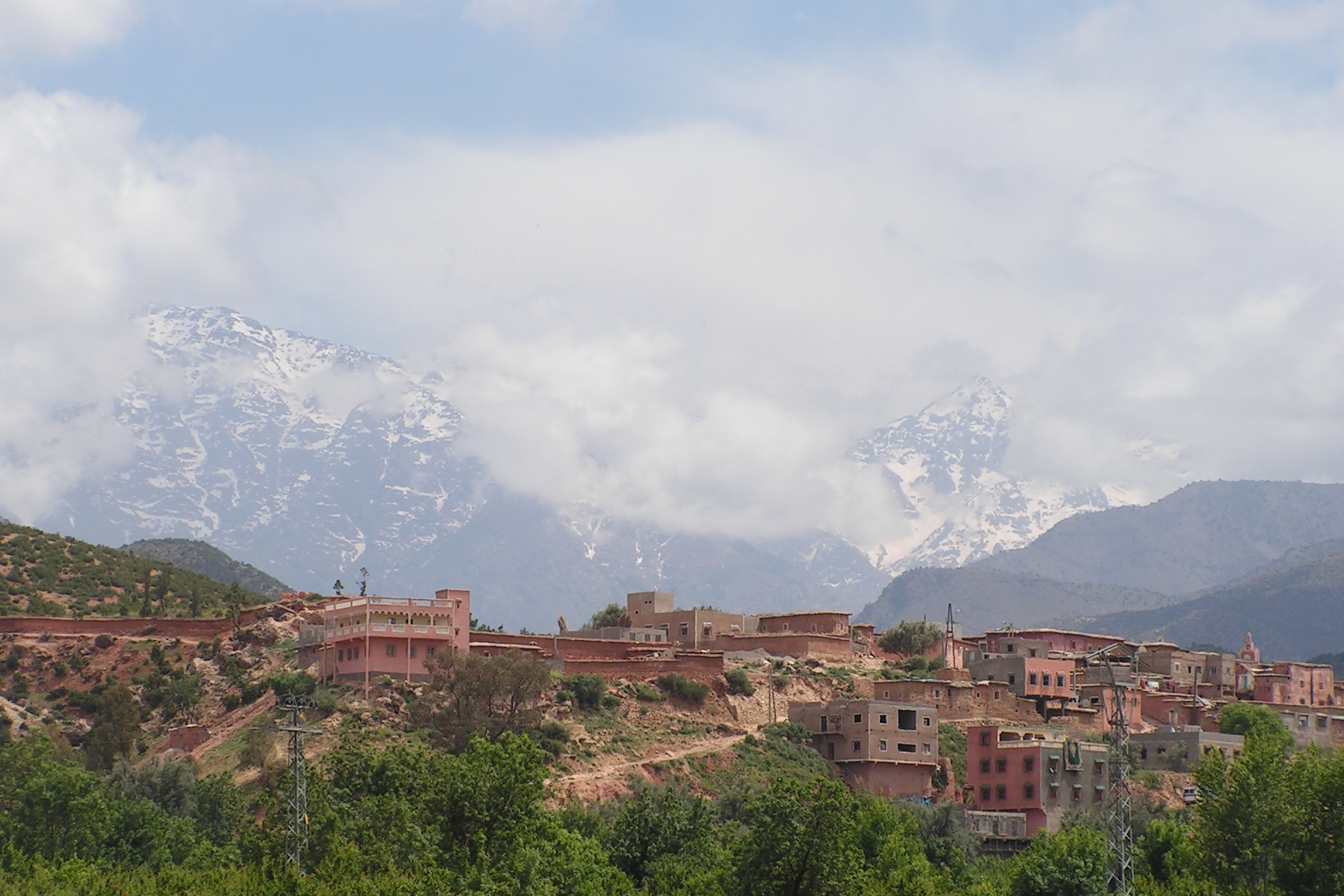
- Interactive map of Asni
- Coordinates: 31°15′N 7°59′W
- Country: Morocco
- Region: Marrakesh-Safi
- Province: Al Haouz
- Time zone: UTC+0 (GMT)

Asni (Arabic: أسني) is a small town and rural commune in the foothills of the High Atlas mountains near Marrakesh, Morocco.

The town is connected to Ikkiss, Imlil and Tacheddirt by tracks. Open back trucks provide a bus service several times a week between these three villages.

Ninety-percent of houses in Asni were destroyed during the 2023 Marrakesh-Safi earthquake.
