= Imi N'Tala =

Coordinates: 31°07′45″N 8°16′01″W

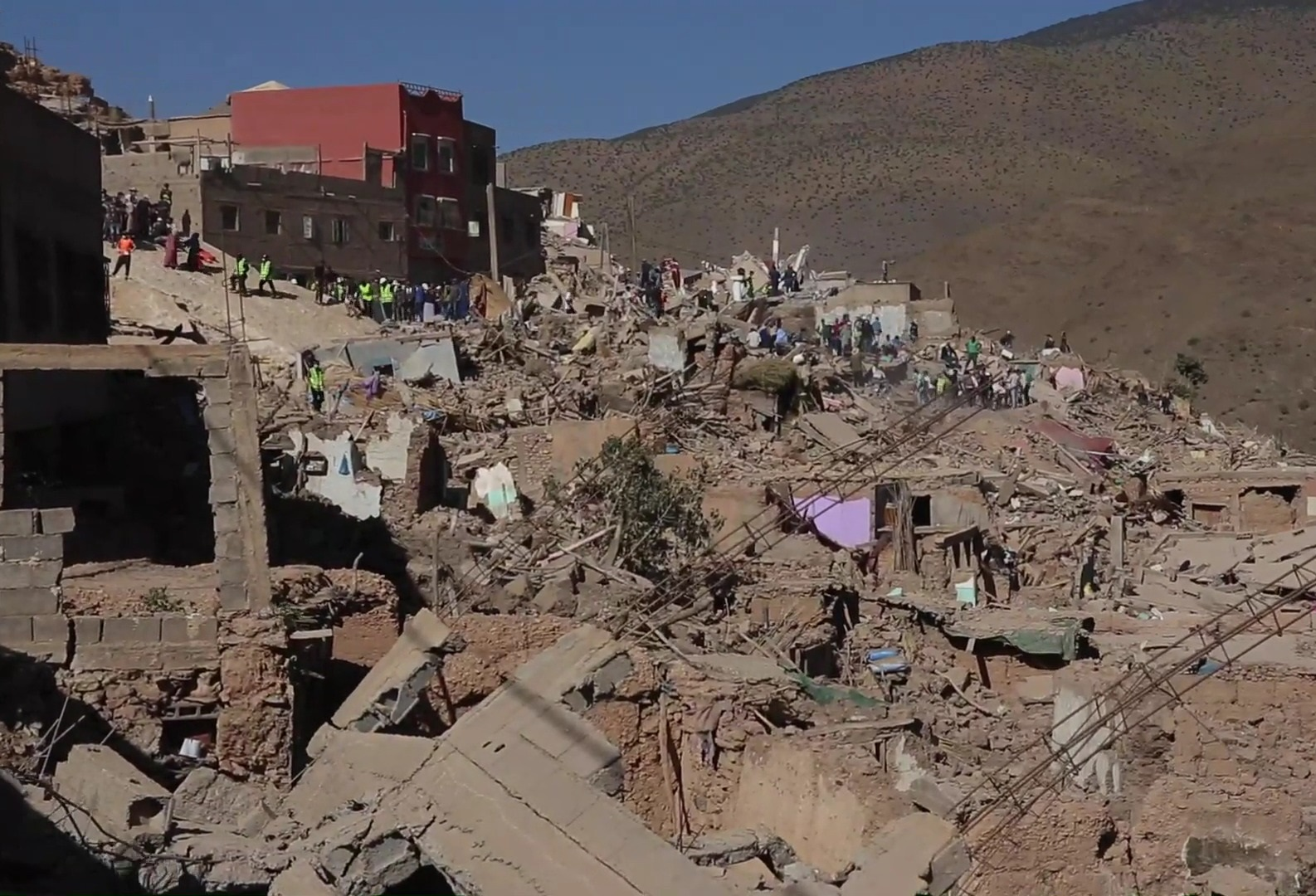
Impact of the 2023 Marrakesh-Safi earthquake in Imi N'Tala.

Imi N'Tala is a remote village in the Marrakesh–Safi region of Morocco.

== History ==
The village was heavily destroyed in the 2023 Marrakesh-Safi earthquake. At least 70 people died in the village.
