= Murders of Louisa Vesterager Jespersen and Maren Ueland =

2018 murders of two Scandinavian tourists in Morocco

- Imlil (Morocco)
- Location: Foothills of Mount Toubkal, close to the village of Imlil, Morocco
- Date: December 17, 2018 (bodies discovered)
- Attack type: Decapitation, stabbing
- Victims: Louisa Vesterager Jespersen; Maren Ueland
- Perpetrator: Islamic State
- Assailants: Abdessamad Ejjoud; Younes Ouaziad; Rachid Afatti
- No. of participants: 24
- Motive: Islamic extremism Revenge for the Battle of Hajin
- Verdict: 4 sentenced to death, 20 sentenced to 5–30 years in prison
- Convictions: Murder

On 17 December 2018, the bodies of Louisa Vesterager Jespersen, a 24-year-old Danish woman, and Maren Ueland, a 28-year-old Norwegian woman, were found decapitated in the foothills of Mount Toubkal near to the village of Imlil in the Atlas Mountains of Morocco.

A total of 18 men were arrested by Moroccan Police in relation to the murders. The murders were described by the Moroccan general prosecutor as a terrorist act, after a video released on the Internet showed several of the suspects swearing allegiance to the Islamic State while decapitating Jespersen. Initially, detectives believed the crimes were sexually motivated, with witnesses and CCTV indicating the suspects followed the women. They were also camped 600 m (2,000 ft) from the women.

Since then the three assailants and a fourth conspirator have been sentenced to death by the Supreme Court of Morocco. These are the first death sentences handed out by Morocco since 1993. The executions are due to be completed within 30 years. As of 2026, two of the four members of the cell sentenced to death committed suicide while in prison.

== Background ==
Louisa Vesterager Jespersen (born 1994) grew up in Ikast, Denmark. She attended Vestre School in Ikast, and graduated from Ikast-Brande Gymnasium in 2013. Before the trip to Morocco, she had been traveling to various countries, such as Argentina, Peru, and Norway. Jespersen had also applied for participation in the Fjällräven Polar expedition in 2017 and 2018.

Maren Ueland (born 1990) was from Bryne, Norway and was a trained social and healthcare assistant.

Jespersen and Ueland were both students at the University of South-Eastern Norway, where they studied outdoor recreation and nature guidance in order to become tour guides. The pair had arrived in Morocco on 9 December as tourists, with the intention of trekking and "chasing experiences", according to Jespersen's mother. The two women first arrived in Marrakesh, before traveling to Imlil in the Atlas Mountains. The village of Imlil is popular with travellers as the main base for summiting Toubkal, which is the highest peak in North Africa.

Four attackers had shared a video on social media before the attacks, pledging allegiance to the ISIS terror group, and discussed "destruction caused by the warplanes of the Crusader alliance". One of the attackers stated, "Keep fighting the enemies of Allah, wherever you are, you have no excuse and, be informed that we are your supporters… you have allies among us".

According to Swedish Defense University researcher Magnus Ranstorp, terrorists attacking tourists is not a new phenomenon, and it aims to destabilize the country where such attacks take place.

While Morocco is generally seen as a secure destination for tourists, the last terrorist attack happened in 2011, where 17 people were killed by a bombing at a restaurant in Marrakesh. One of them was 18-year-old Salome Girard, a friend of Maren Ueland. Over 1,600 people have traveled from Morocco to join the Islamic State in the Syrian civil war. Moroccan authorities initially ignored the people who joined ISIS but later realized they could return to commit terrorist offenses in Morocco. As a result, the Bureau central d'investigation judiciaire (BCIJ) was formed.

According to a researcher at the Danish Institute for International Studies, "Moroccan authorities appear to have a good grip on the jihadist situation, and cooperate with European and US authorities". Moroccans are overrepresented in "diaspora terrorism", which is terrorism which takes place outside the borders of Morocco; for example, two Moroccans were behind the 2017 London Bridge attack, a Moroccan killed people by driving his van into pedestrians in La Rambla in the 2017 Barcelona terrorist attacks, and the following day, another Moroccan killed two women and wounded 8 other victims in the 2017 Turku attack.

== Murders and investigation ==
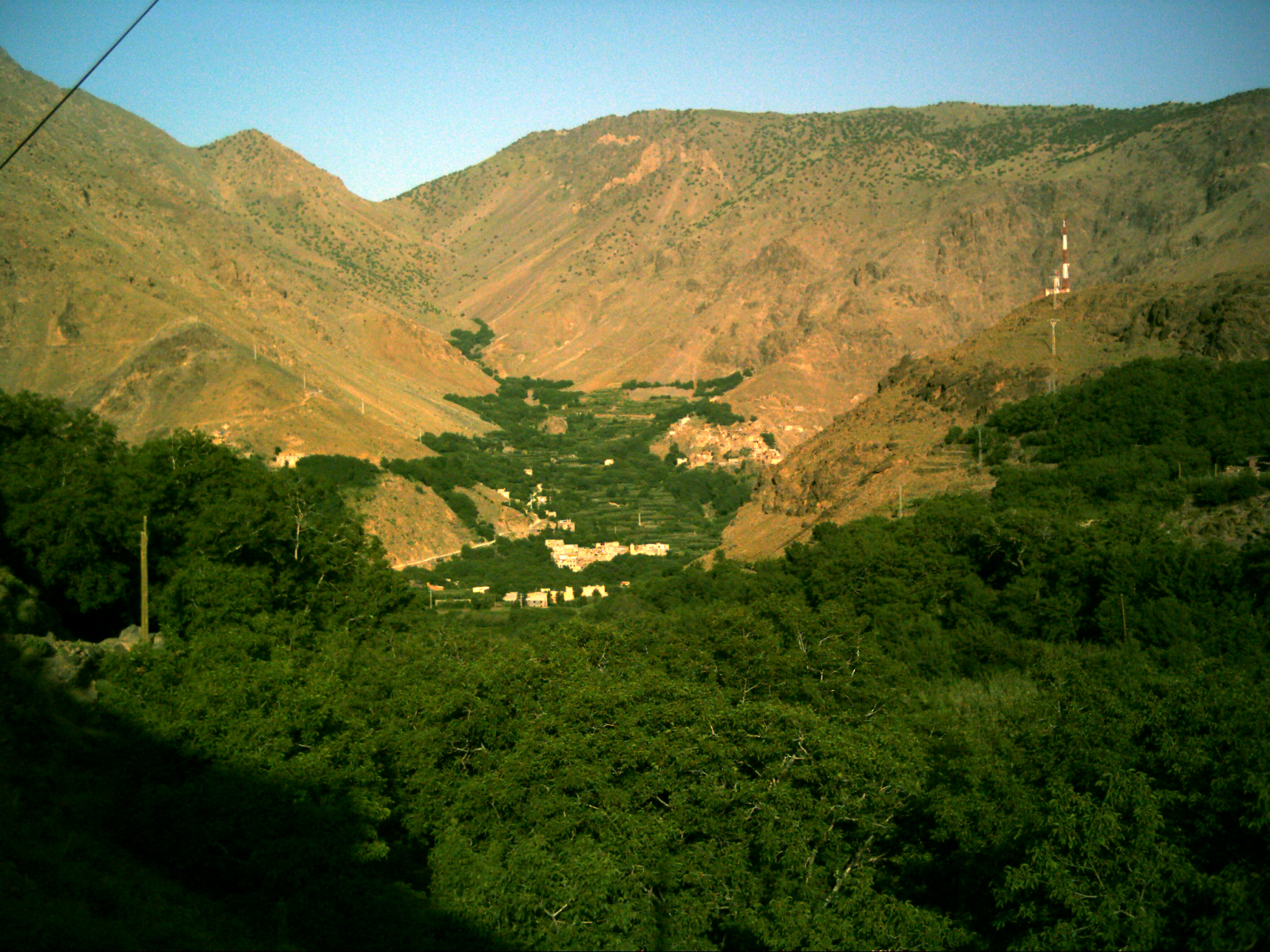
The village of Imlil and the surrounding valley

On the morning of 17 December 2018, a pair of French hikers came across the decapitated bodies of the victims, and their tent, near a trail connecting Imlil to Mount Toubkal. A suspect named Abderrahmane Khayali was quickly apprehended following the incident, after police found an ID in the victims' tent, that had been left behind by the suspect. Three additional suspects, Abdessamad Ejjoud, Rachid Afatti, and Younes Ouaziad, were later apprehended by the police while riding a bus during the morning rush hour in the nearby city of Marrakesh. The three suspects were caught in possession of bladed weapons. Abdessamad Ejjoud was the leader of the group, and the four men had shot a video the week before the murders, where they pledged allegiance to ISIS.

The killers had agreed to carry out a terrorist act on either security services or foreign tourists, before deciding to travel to the Imlil region to look for foreigners, and where they would target the two backpackers. In the video of the killings, the attackers can be heard shouting "enemies of Allah", and "revenge for our brothers in Hajin".

Moroccan police later made additional arrests of individuals believed to have connections with the suspects.

According to the investigation, the cell's ringleader was 25-year-old Abdessamad Ejjoud (born 15 August 1993), who worked as a carpenter and was nicknamed "Abu Musab” and "Abu Asiya", from the village of Douar El Caid in the rural commune of Harbil. Ejjoud was previously arrested alongside seven other people at the Mohammed V Airport in Casablanca on May 29, 2014 while attempting to leave for Syria. He was freed from the local prison in Salé in July 2015 and moved to the village of Douar El Aounat after a dispute with his father, he later became the imam of the village mosque.

Ejjoud increasingly got isolated throughout 2015, telling his family to tell them he had died if anybody asked about him. Local authorities had issued a summons against Ejjoud for preaching without a recommendation from the Council of Oulemas in Morocco, forcing him to return to his parents' house in his home village.

The first suspect to be arrested was Abderrahmane Khayali (1985 – 28 February 2023), a married father-of-two who worked as a plumber and bird poacher. Khayali was arrested at his home the morning after the murders at his home on December 18th. The video pledging allegiance was filmed in Abderrahmane Khayali's makeshift concrete dwelling in the village of Douar El Bagh, in the rural commune of Souihla.

Neighbours tipped authorities off about Khayali after he was unusually seen with a shaven beard the night of the murders. He had previously been arrested by the Royal Gendarmerie for illegally hunting pigeons and partridges, but was released without charge after a day in custody. He dropped out of school in the first year of middle school before getting vocational training as a plumber, working for years as a plumber at a Marrakech hotel where he was known to drink and smoke often. Khayali left his job in 2014 and became self-employed, he became increasingly religious after meeting Ouaziad in 2016 according to his family.

Ueland was befriended by 25-year-old Younes Ouaziad (May 1993 – 1 July 2025), who worked as a carpenter and a fruit seller in Marrakech. Ouaziad grew up in the same village as Khayali and dropped out of the third year of primary school and was addicted to hashish and alcohol as a teenager. Khayali and Ouaziad attended the mosque Ejjoud preached at.

=== Trial ===
In total, 24 went on trial in Salé, near Rabat in Morocco. Of those charged, 23 suspects were Moroccans from Marrakesh, and one was a Swiss-Spanish Muslim convert. Three of them were charged with murder, and the other 23 of various terrorist charges.

In May 2019, Ejjoud admitted to killing one of the women. He had previously been jailed for having attempted to join the Islamic State in Syria, and was released in 2015. He is the one who killed and beheaded Jespersen in the video. Ejjoud also confessed to planning the murders with the other two suspects.

In July 2019, three of the suspects were given a death sentence, which their lawyer said he would appeal.

==== Appeal ====
On 31 October 2019, the death sentence for three of the convicted was upheld by the anti-terrorist court in Salé. In total, 24 suspects connected to the murders, or who were members of the jihadist cell, were sentenced.

The prime suspect, Abdessamad Ejjoud, was 25 years of age and organized the murder expedition with two accomplices, Younes Ouaziad (27) and Rachid Afatti (33) who filmed the murders. A fourth suspect, Abderrahmane Khayali, had his sentence elevated from life imprisonment to the death penalty. Khayali was part of the expedition into the mountain, but left the group before the killings. The court upheld received sentences from 5 to 30 years in prison for nineteen of the accused, and elevated one sentence from 15 to 20 years in prison. Ejjoud used his chance to speak before the sentence to ask for the death penalty, as he believed in neither the laws nor human rights. Ouaziad and Afatti recited verses from the Quran.

Like in the first trial, the court ordered the four prime suspects to pay 190,000 euros to the parents of Maren Ueland.

The death penalty is still in effect in Morocco. In practice, no executions have taken place since 1993.

As of 2024, the suspects are still awaiting execution. On 28 February 2023, Abderrahmane Khayali committed suicide by hanging with a piece of cloth taken from his clothes anchored to a window; he was awaiting execution at the local prison in Oujda. On 1 July 2025, Younes Ouaziad committed suicide in the same manner while awaiting execution at the local prison in Larache. Ouaziad had been diagnosed with mental illness while in prison and had been under psychiatric surveillance, regularly taking medication and having received treatment for a flu the day of his death.

== Funerals ==
The remains of the victims were flown to Copenhagen, Denmark on 21 December 2018.

Jespersen's funeral was held in her native town of Ikast, Denmark on 12 January. The Prime Minister of Denmark, Lars Løkke Rasmussen, attended the funeral.

Ueland was buried on 21 January in Jæren, Norway. The Norwegian Minister of Health, Bent Høie, and the Moroccan Ambassador, Lamia Radi, attended the ceremony.

== Aftermath ==
In Morocco, news of the attack was met with widespread outrage and condemnation. The incident received extensive coverage in the international press. Reactions in the native countries of the victims were of shock and outrage. A public torchlit vigil was held in Ueland's native town of Bryne in support of her family and loved ones.

Vigils for the victims were held in Rabat, Morocco at the embassies of Norway and Denmark, along with vigils in Marrakesh and Imlil.

Two videos, one depicting the murder, and another where the suspects filmed themselves swearing allegiance to ISIS, were published onto social media. Moroccan authorities and Norway's National Criminal Investigation Service agents have said the videos are authentic.

== See also ==
- Kayla Mueller – American activist and aid worker abducted by ISIS and later killed
