= Tafeghaghte =

Village in Marrakesh-Safi, Morocco

Coordinates: 31°11′46″N 8°13′26″W

Tafeghaghte is a rural village in the Atlas Mountains of Morocco, located 60km south-west of Marrakesh.

== History ==
In the 2023 Marrakesh-Safi earthquake, 90 people in the village were reported killed. Most of the settlement was destroyed.
