= Ikkiss =

- Coordinates: 31°10′0″N 7°53′0″W

Ikkiss is a small village in Morocco's High Atlas mountains, in the Rhirhaia valley. It is just over 2000 m above sea level. It has a population of about 600 people.

It is connected to Asni and Imlil by tracks. Open-back trucks provide a bus service several times a week between these three villages. Further up the valley is the village of Tacheddirt.
