= Tacheddirt =

Tacheddirt تشديرت ⵜⴰⵛⴷⵉⵔⵜ
- Town
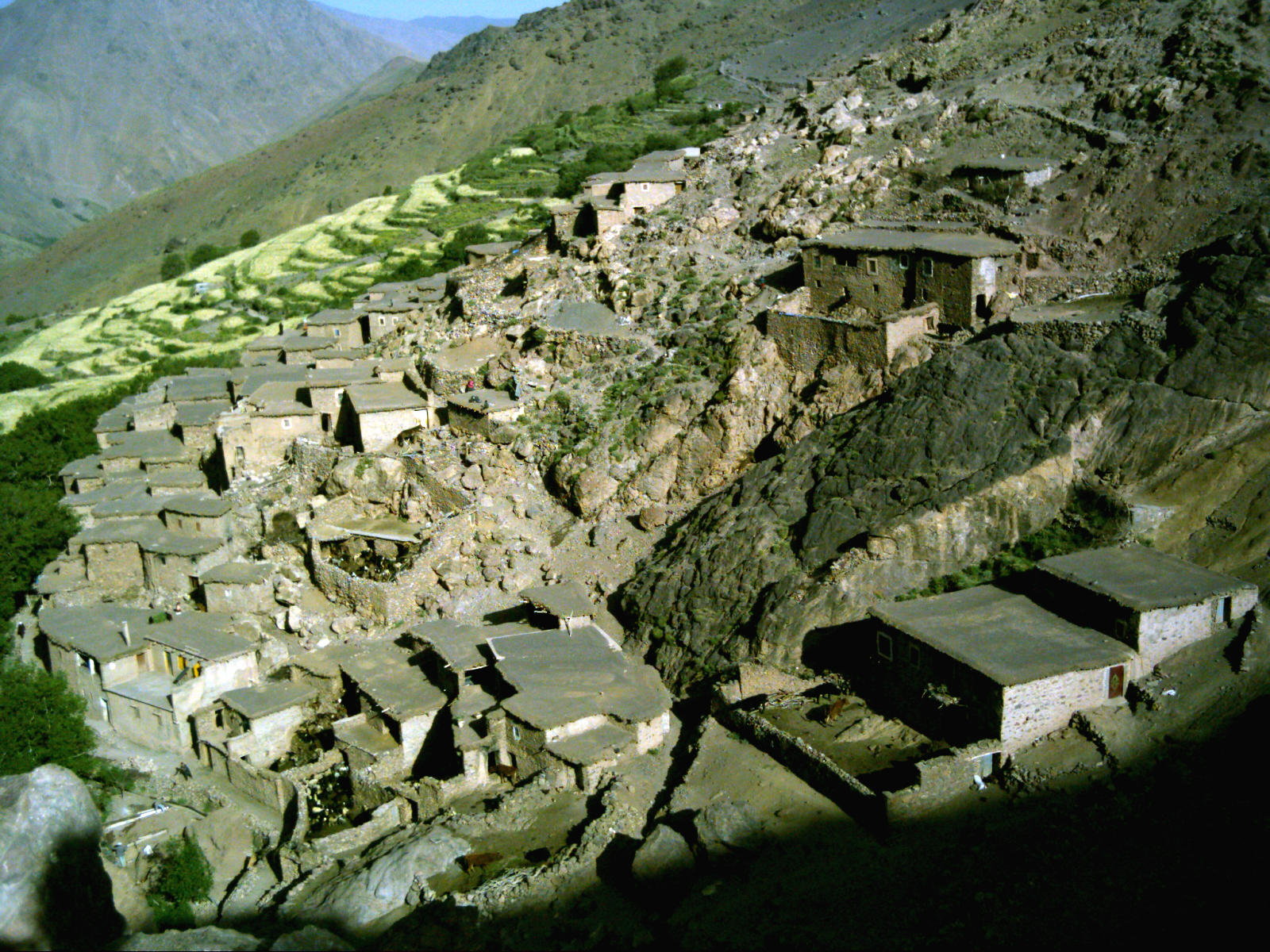
- Tacheddirt, looking west. 2004.
- Interactive map of Tacheddirt
- Coordinates: 31°09′22″N 7°50′42″W
- Country: Morocco
- Region: Marrakesh-Safi
- Province: Al Haouz
- Commune: Asni
- Time zone: UTC+0 (GMT)

Tacheddirt is a small village high up (2314 m) in the High Atlas Mountains of Morocco. It is the highest permanent settlement in North Africa, about 4 km further up from Ikkiss.

It has a population of about 200 to 300 people. Access is limited to a steep and winding footpath.
