= Ighil, Morocco =

Ighil
- Rural commune and town
- Location within Morocco
- Coordinates: 31°25′N 7°39′W
- Country: Morocco
- Region: Marrakesh-Safi
- Province: Al Haouz Province

Population (2004)
  - Total: 5,619
- Time zone: UTC+0 (GMT)

Ighil (Moroccan Arabic: إيغيل) is a small town and rural commune in Al Haouz Province of the Marrakesh-Safi region of Morocco. At the time of the 2004 census, the commune had a total population of 5619 people living in 858 households.

== History ==
The municipality of Ighil was created in 1992.

On 8 September 2023, Ighil was the epicenter of the 2023 Marrakesh-Safi earthquake.
