= Tifnout =

Coordinates: 31°04′N 7°45′W

Tifnout is a region in Adrar N’Dern or what called High Atlas, located in Tifnout Valley, east Toubkal Mountain, Taroudant Province, in the Souss-Massa region, in the southwest of Morocco.

Tifnout means in Tachelhit "Very beautiful" and Tifnout Region inhabited by Ait Tifnout Amazigh tribe. Tifnout region is divided into three rural commune (Ahl Tifnout, Iguidi, Toubkal).

== Tourism ==
Tourism areas in the region include Ifni Lake, Toubkal Mountain, Ouanakrim, Mountain n'Tarourt, and Tifnout Valley in Toubkal National Park.

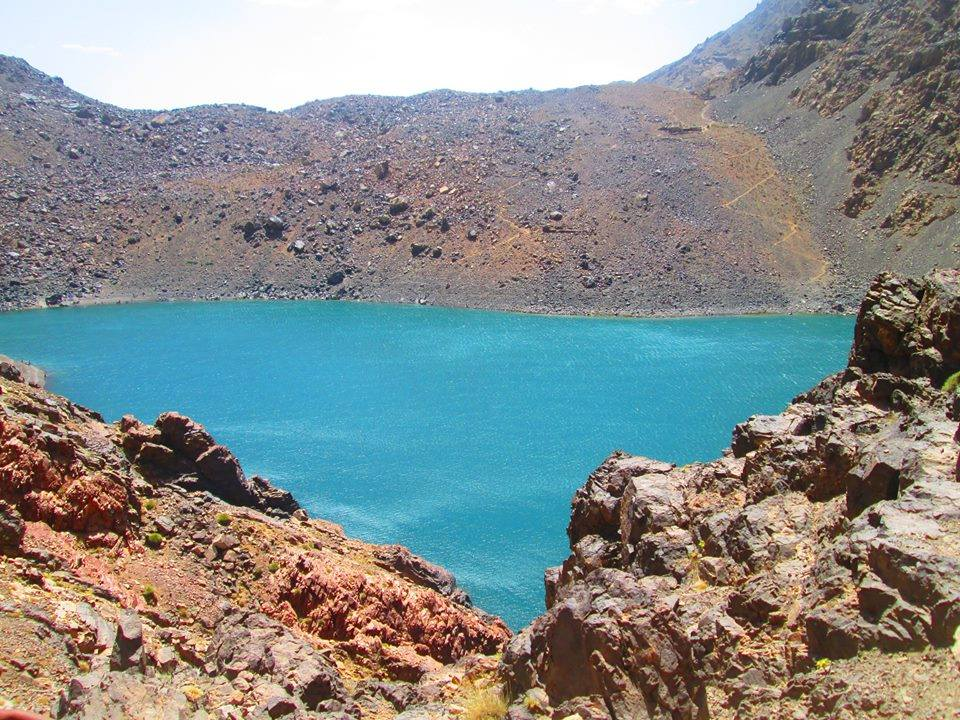
Ifni Lake "Tifnout Lake" - Tifnout

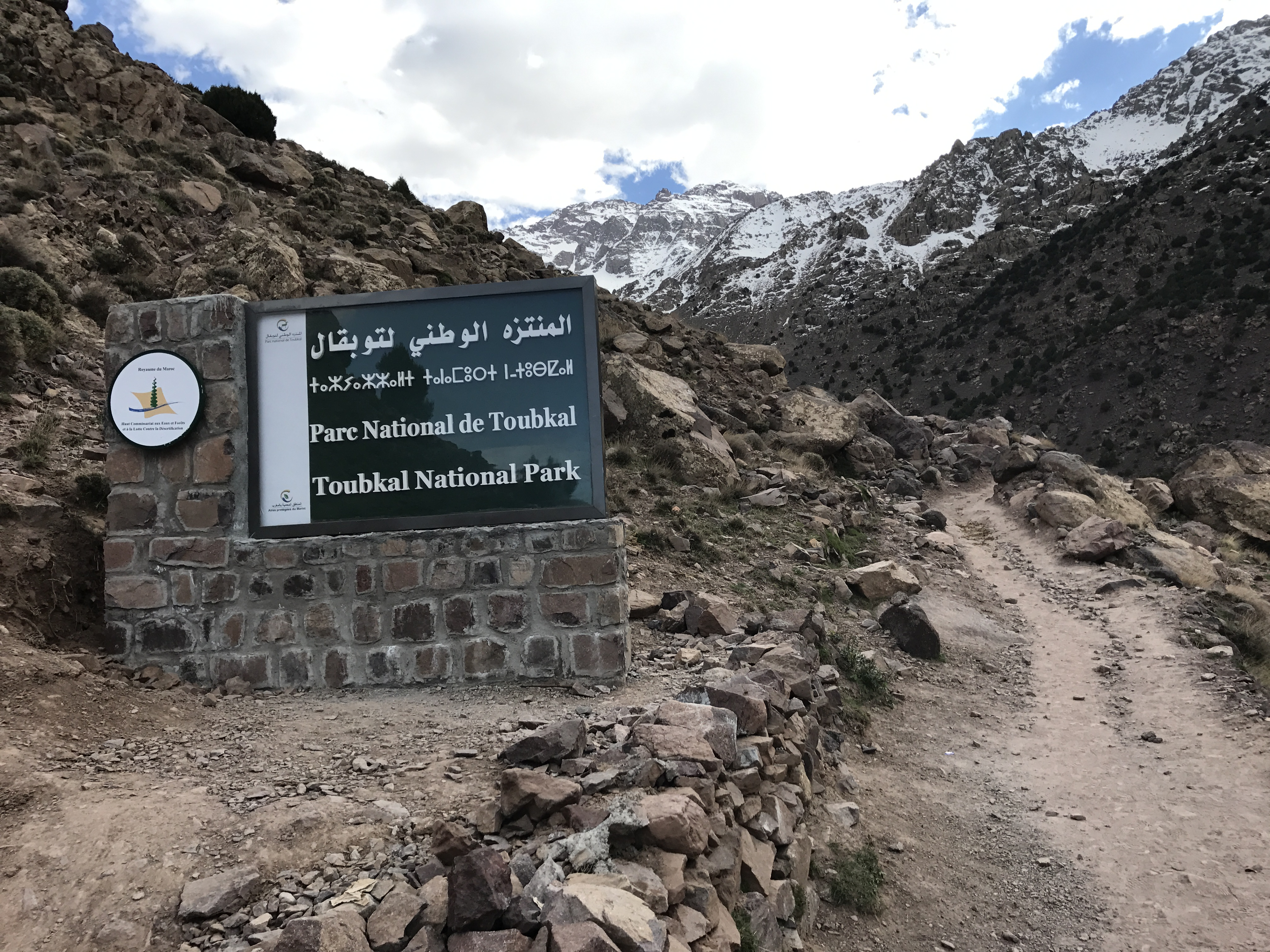
Toubkal National Park

South of Toubkal National Park, Mount Adrar N’Dern is a 4,001 m peak southeast of Jbel Toubkal in the Western High Atlas.

== Tifnout towns ==
Tifnout Region is divided into three rural commune (Ahl Tifnout, Iguidi, Toubkal) and those communes contain a lot of small towns they are:

Ait Tifnout
Toubkal Commune	Iguidi Commune	Ahl Tifnout Commune
1- Imlil 2- Ouaounzourte 3- Alemkal 4- Tagnite 5- Mzguimnate 6- Talmiresalte 7- Andod 8- Tizoual 9- Agadir N' Mehamed 10- Amsouzart 11- Ibrouane 12- Takatert 13- Tiskan 14- Ait Igran 15- Iguanoudine 16- Tamzguine 17- Aguerzrane 18- Tisselday(missour) 19- Zawyte 20- Almawdi 21- Azrou N'Toubkal 22- Tasseloumte 23- Talmelste 24- Adad 25- Tamsoulte 26- Tikchedren 27- Tigmi n igran 28- Larbaa 29- Tgount 30- Afza	1-Imourekhesan 2- Timyaline 3- tanghramt 4- Aghella 5- Ougouguen 6- Tigroute 7- Amzaourou 8- Ait Maad 9- Tifkilt 10- Assaka Wizguer 11- Ighebli 12- Anerouy 13- Aghefzli 14- Igli 15- Aghelad 16- Tamsoulte 17- Mezi 18- Tighariwine 19- iguidi ㅤ ㅤ ㅤ ㅤ ㅤ ㅤ ㅤ ㅤ ㅤ ㅤ ㅤ	1- Assarag 2- Anmid 3- Tanmitert 4- Amzerkou 5- Tizoukhine 6- Imin Ouamoumen 7- Ikis 8- Tirirte 9- Azro 10- Tagadirt N'Id Hammou 11- Takaterte 12- Izaken 13- Arg 14- Ighil 15- Tamsoulte 16- Tiqi 17- Anmitr 18-Tamgote 19-Tayzlt ㅤㅤㅤㅤ ㅤ ㅤ ㅤ ㅤ ㅤ ㅤ ㅤ ㅤ ㅤ ㅤ

== See also ==
- Ahl Tifnoute
- Toubkal (commune)
- Iguidi
- Toubkal National Park
