= List of highest mountain peaks of Morocco =

| Name | Range | Photograph | Height | Prominence (m) | Isolation (km) | Co-ordinates | Observations |
|---|---|---|---|---|---|---|---|
| Toubkal | High Atlas | | 4,165 metres (13,665 ft) | 3755 | 2078 | 31.059°N 7.916°W | Highest point in North Africa |
| Ouanoukrim | High Atlas | | 4,089 metres (13,415 ft) | 339 | 3.9 | 31.036°N 7.947°W | Second highest peak in North Africa |
| M'Goun | High Atlas | | 4,071 metres (13,356 ft) | 1904 | 149 | 31.508°N 6.443°W | Third highest peak in North Africa, second highest major summit |
| Afella | High Atlas | | 4,043 metres (13,264 ft) | 210 | 1.6 | 31.055°N 7.952°W | Fourth highest peak in North Africa |
| Akioud | High Atlas | | 4,030 metres (13,220 ft) | 135 | 0.8 | 31.047°N 7.949°W | Fifth highest peak in North Africa |
| Jebel n'Tarourt | High Atlas | | 3,996 metres (13,110 ft) | 894 | 14.3 | 31.082°N 7.765°W | Sixth highest peak in North Africa |
| Biquinoussene | High Atlas | | 4,002 metres (13,130 ft) | 101 | 1.0 | 31.066°N 7.950°W | Seventh highest peak in North Africa |
| Tazaqhart | High Atlas | | 3,980 metres (13,060 ft) | 103 | 0.7 | 31.058°N 7.960°W | high point of plateau |
| Taska n'Zat | High Atlas | | 3,912 metres (12,835 ft) | 447 | 13.4 | 31.164°N 7.648°W | Ninth highest peak in North Africa |
| Jebel Aksousal | High Atlas | | 3,910 metres (12,830 ft) | 468 | 7.8 | 31.118°N 7.858°W | Tenth highest peak in North Africa |
| Adrar n'Inghemar | High Atlas | | 3,892 metres (12,769 ft) | 355 | 7.2 | 31.151°N 7.793°W | Eleventh highest peak in North Africa |
| Tignousti | High Atlas | | 3,819 metres (12,530 ft) | 928 | 17.5 | 31.498°N 6.717°W | Twelfth highest peak in North Africa |
| Jebel Rhat | High Atlas | | 3,797 metres (12,457 ft) | 459 | 3.5 | 31.521°N 6.742°W | Thirteenth highest peak in North Africa |
| Jebel Ouaougoulzat | High Atlas | | 3,763 metres (12,346 ft) | 838 | 16.7 | 31.655°N 6.256°W | Fourteenth highest peak in North Africa |
| Arin' Ayachi | High Atlas | | 3,747 metres (12,293 ft) | 1383 | 155.1 | 32.477°N 4.927°W | Fifteenth highest peak in North Africa |
| Jebel Azurki | High Atlas | | 3,677 metres (12,064 ft) | 779 | 9.6 | 31.747°N 6.261°W | Sixteenth highest peak in North Africa |
| Adrar n'Tiniline | High Atlas | | 3,674 metres (12,054 ft) | 372 | 3.9 | 31.079°N 7.830°W | Seventeenth highest peak in North Africa |
| Jbel Igdet | High Atlas | | 3,615 metres (11,860 ft) | 1609 | 45 | 30.963°N 8.443°W | Eighteenth highest peak in North Africa |
| Angour | High Atlas | | 3,616 metres (11,864 ft) | 417 | 3.0 | 31.175°N 7.826°W | Nineteenth highest peak in North Africa |
| Jebel Anghomer | High Atlas | | 3,609 metres (11,841 ft) | 1414 | 30.8 | 31.336°N 6.998°W | Twentieth highest peak in North Africa |
| Adrar Bou Naceur | Middle Atlas | | 3,340 metres (10,960 ft) | 1642 | 148 | 33.568°N 3.886°W | |
| Jbel Sirwa | Anti-Atlas | | 3,305 metres (10,843 ft) | 1075 | 40.7 | 30.704°N 7.622°W | |

== See also ==
- Atlas Mountains
