= List of highest mountain peaks in the Arab World =

This is a list of the highest summits located in the Arab world of the Middle East.

== Summits ==
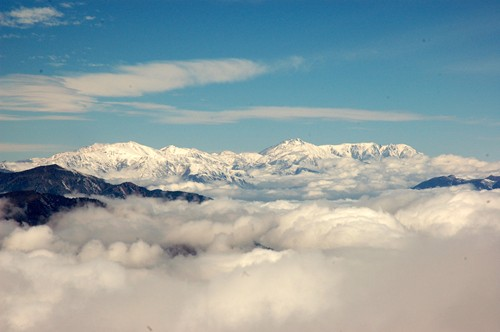
Toubkal mountain.

Rank	Country	Highest Summit	Height	Comments
1	Morocco	Toubkal	4,165 meters	
2	Morocco	Ouanoukrim	4,089 meters	
3	Morocco	M'Goun mountain	4,071 metres	
4	Morocco	Jebel Afella	4,043 metres	
5	Morocco	Akioud	3,666 meters	
6	Morocco	Jebel n'Tarourt	3,996 meters	
7	Morocco	Biquinoussene	3,990 meters	
8	Morocco	Tazaqhart'	3,980 meters	
9	Morocco	Taska n'Zat	3,912 meters	
10	Morocco	Jebel Aksousal	3,910 meters	
11	Morocco	Adrar n'Inghemar	3,892 meters	
12	Morocco	Tignousti	3,819 meters	
13	Morocco	Jebel Rhat	3,797 meters	
14	Morocco	Jebel Ouaougoulzat	3,763 meters	
15	Morocco	Ayachi	3,747 meters	
16	Morocco	Jebel Azurki	3,677 meters	
17	Morocco	Adrar n'Tiniline	3,674 meter	
18	Yemen	Jabal An-Nabi Shu'ayb	3,666 meters	
19	Morocco	Jbel Igdet	3,615 meters	
20	Morocco	Angour	3,615 meters	
21	Iraq	Cheekha Dar	3,611 meters	
22	Morocco	Jebel Anghomer	3,609 meters	
23	Morocco	Adrar Bou Naceur	3,340 meters	
24	Lebanon	Qurnat as Sawda'	3,088 meters	
25	Lebanon	Mount Hermon	2,814 meters	
26	Syria	Mount Hermon	2,814 meters	
27	Lebanon	Sannine	2,628 meters	
28	Israel	Mount Meron	1,047 meters	
29	Israel	Har HaAri	1,208 meters	
30	Israel	Mount Ramon	1,037 meters	
31	Palestine	Judaean Mountains	1,026 meters	
32	Israel	Har H̱emet	918 meters	
33	Israel	Mount Pitam	863 meters	
34	Israel	Har Basemat	861 meters	
35	Israel	Har Arikha	859 meters	
36	Israel	Har Nafẖa	846 meters	
