= Lake Ifni =

Lake in Morocco

- ضاية إفني (Moroccan Arabic)
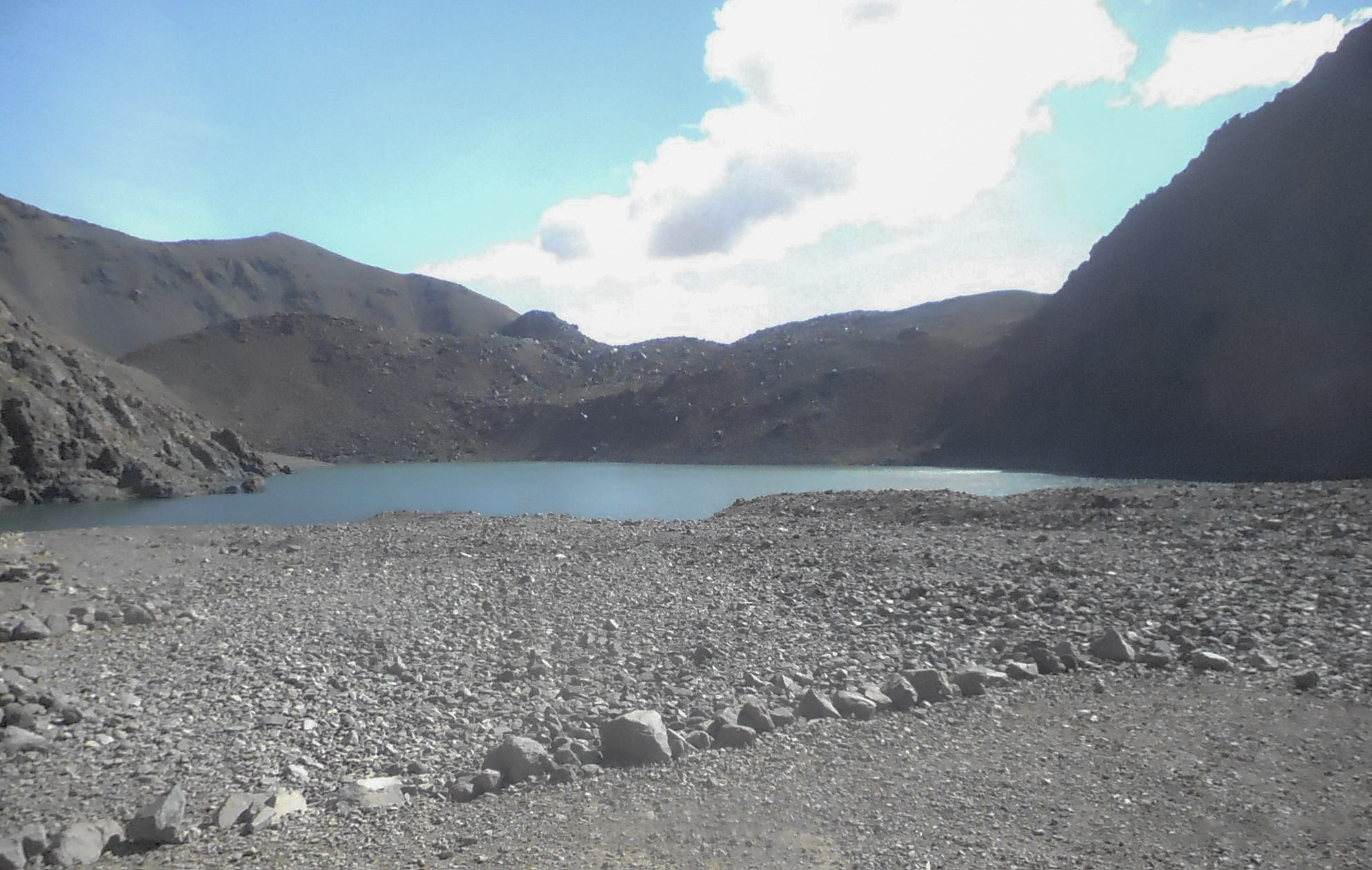
- Interactive map of Lake Ifni
- Location: Taroudant Province
- Type: Lake
- Basin countries: Morocco

Lake Ifni (Arabic:Dayet Ifni) is a green lake located in the soil of Toubkal National Park, in the Moroccan Toubkal (commune), deep in the High Atlas mountain range, with a continental climate, and directly overlooked by the highest peak in North Africa, which is the summit of Mount Toubkal. The lake is distinguished by its steep slopes, its location at the end of the valley, its great depth, and its height above sea level, which is about 2,500 meters. It is therefore one of the highest lakes in the world. Its area is about 26 hectares, its length is estimated at 870 meters, and its width is about 490 meters. with a discharge rate of 300 meters per second, and a depth exceeding 30 meters.

== Morphology ==
The geological history of the region dates back to the first geological time, more than 245 million years ago.

== Location ==
Lake Ifni is located within the Toubkal National Park, in the western Great View, specifically on the territory of the Toubkal community, Taroudant province, Souss-Massa region, near the Amsousart roundabout.

Lake Ifni is located at the end of an enclosed valley, in a rugged mountainous area whose formation dates back more than 245 million years.It is surrounded by steep slopes in all directions, except for the west, from which it opens onto the valley through a vast surface made of pebbles and stones, and is directly overlooked by the highest peak in North Africa, which is the summit of Mount Toubkal, 4167 metres, in addition to the Ouanokarim summit and others.

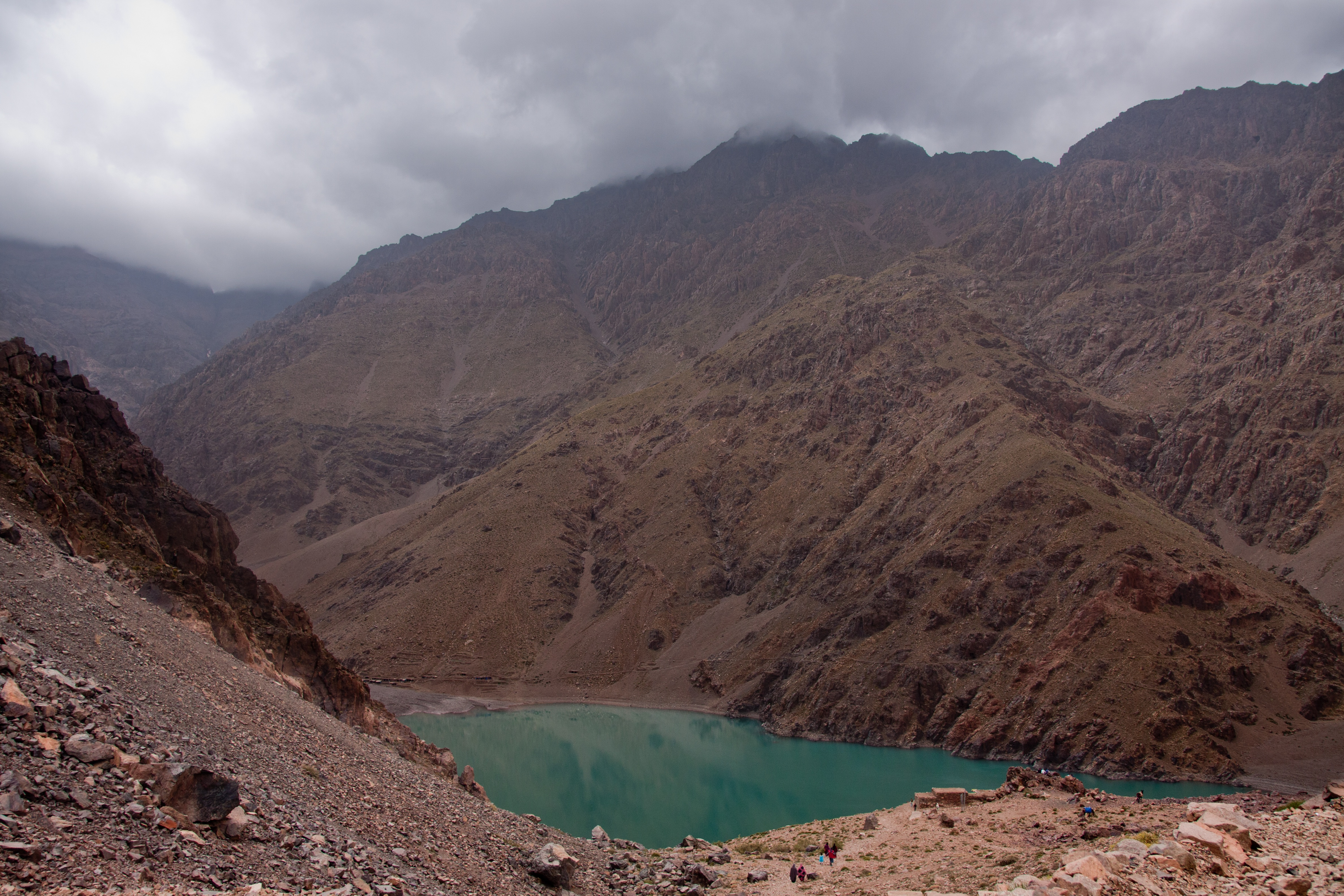
Lake Ifni from above

== Climate ==
The lake has a continental climate, with the highest temperature reaching 45 degrees during the summer, and below zero during the winter, which causes the lake's water to freeze.

== Population ==
Lake Ifni is considered a natural dam that residents use for agricultural activities. More than ten villages in the region benefit from the waters of Lake Ifni, Since the terrain of the region is difficult, crops are carried out on the slopes in the form of agricultural terraces. The inhabitants of these areas are considered to be from the Atlantic Berber tribes. The dominant language in the region is the Amazigh. In addition to agriculture, residents depend on grazing as a primary source of income for their livelihood, especially goats.

== Tourism ==
The lake is a favorite place for mountain sports enthusiasts nationally and internationally. Despite its difficult terrain, not all of it is used for grazing livestock. The western side of the lake has an open area and contains small buildings for the use of tourists. Many people also like camping and recreation. A road has been built through the village of Imsuzart which allows tourists to reach the beach by car. This lake is also considered a stopover for climbing Toubkal Peak from the eastern side, and its presence revitalizes the local economy for residents, especially during the period of snowfall.

Swimming in Lake Ifni is difficult and dangerous. This area has witnessed many drowning cases, especially among tourists.

In recent years, the High Atlas mountains have attracted a good number of tourists who on many occasions make the ascent of Mount Tubqal and visit the lake. In addition, there are other companies that offer only the visit to the lake, in a two-day activity,

== Culture ==
The Moroccan documentary Amouddou recorded its seventh episode in the great Atlas and more especially in Lake Ifni.

== Gallery ==
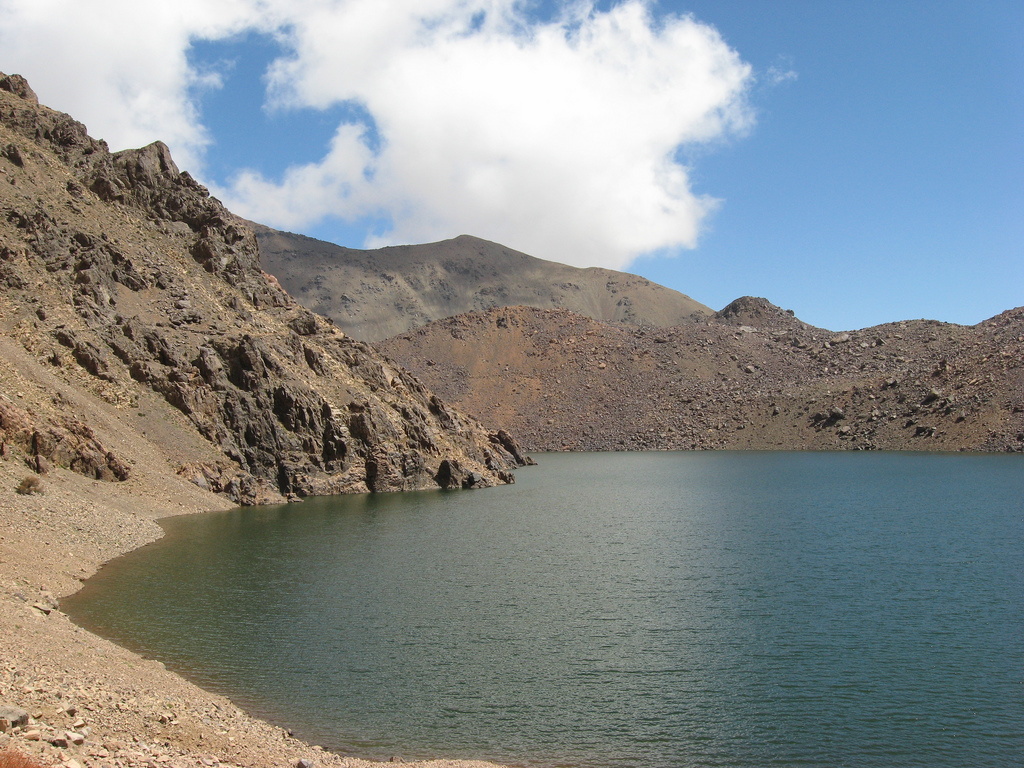
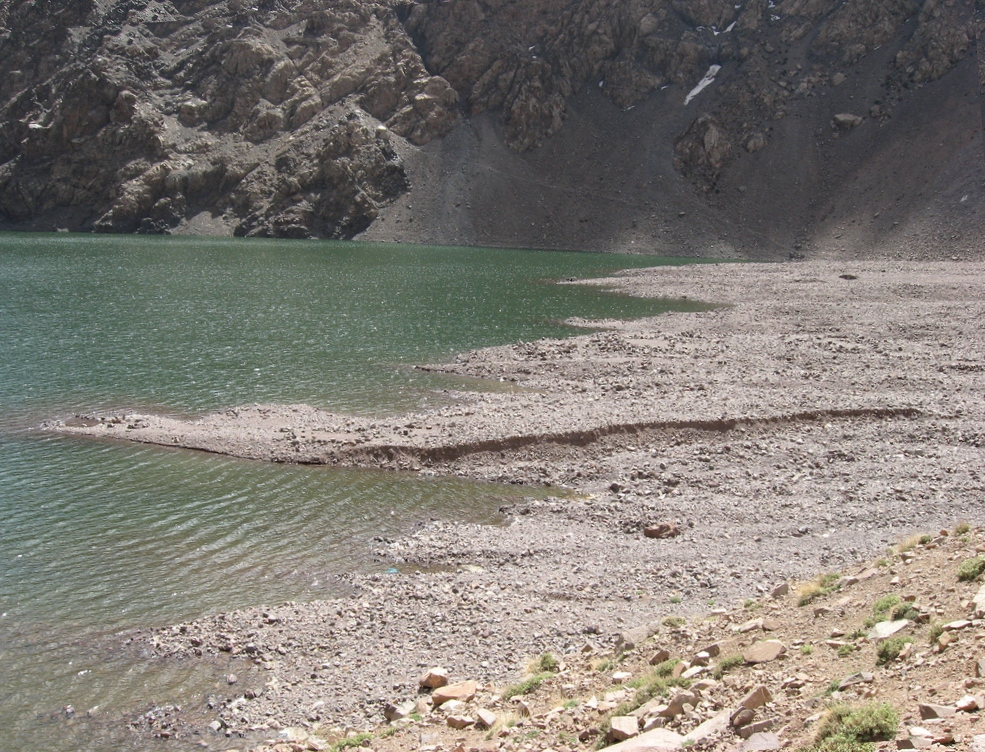

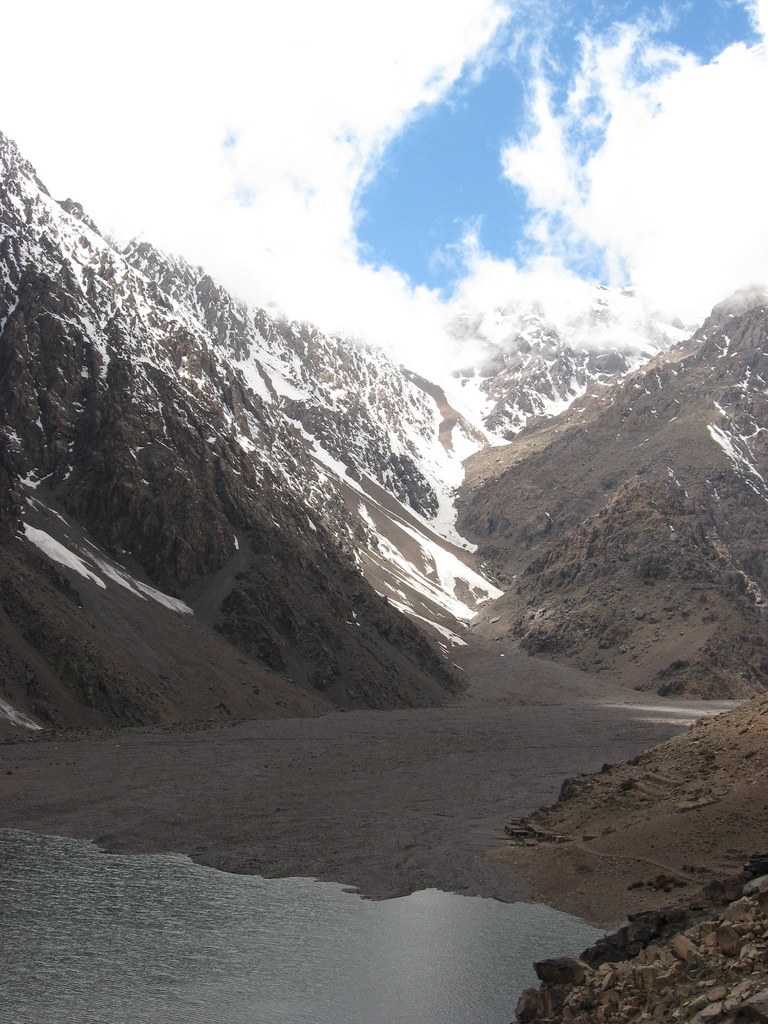
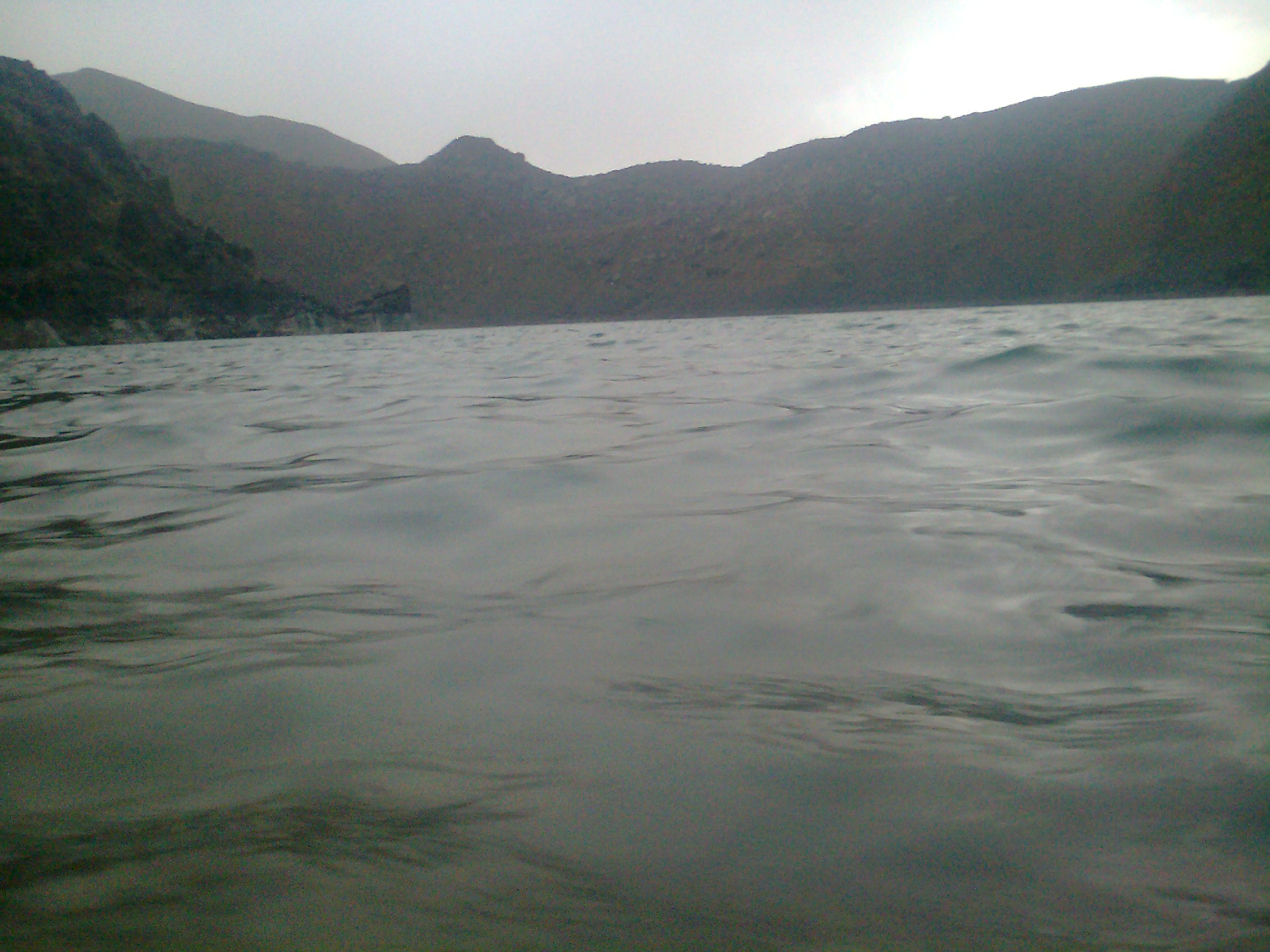

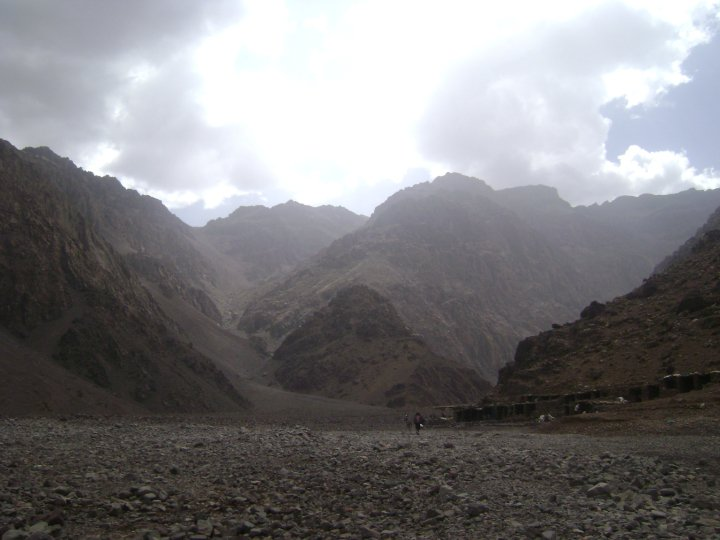
