= Toubkal (disambiguation) =

Toubkal can refer to these locations in Morocco:

- Toubkal, mountain peak in southwestern Morocco, the highest in North Africa.
- Toubkal National Park, national park in the High Atlas mountain range, 70 kilometres from Marrakesh in central-western Morocco.
- Toubkal, small town and rural commune in Taroudant Province of the Souss-Massa-Drâa region of Morocco.
