= Aroumd =

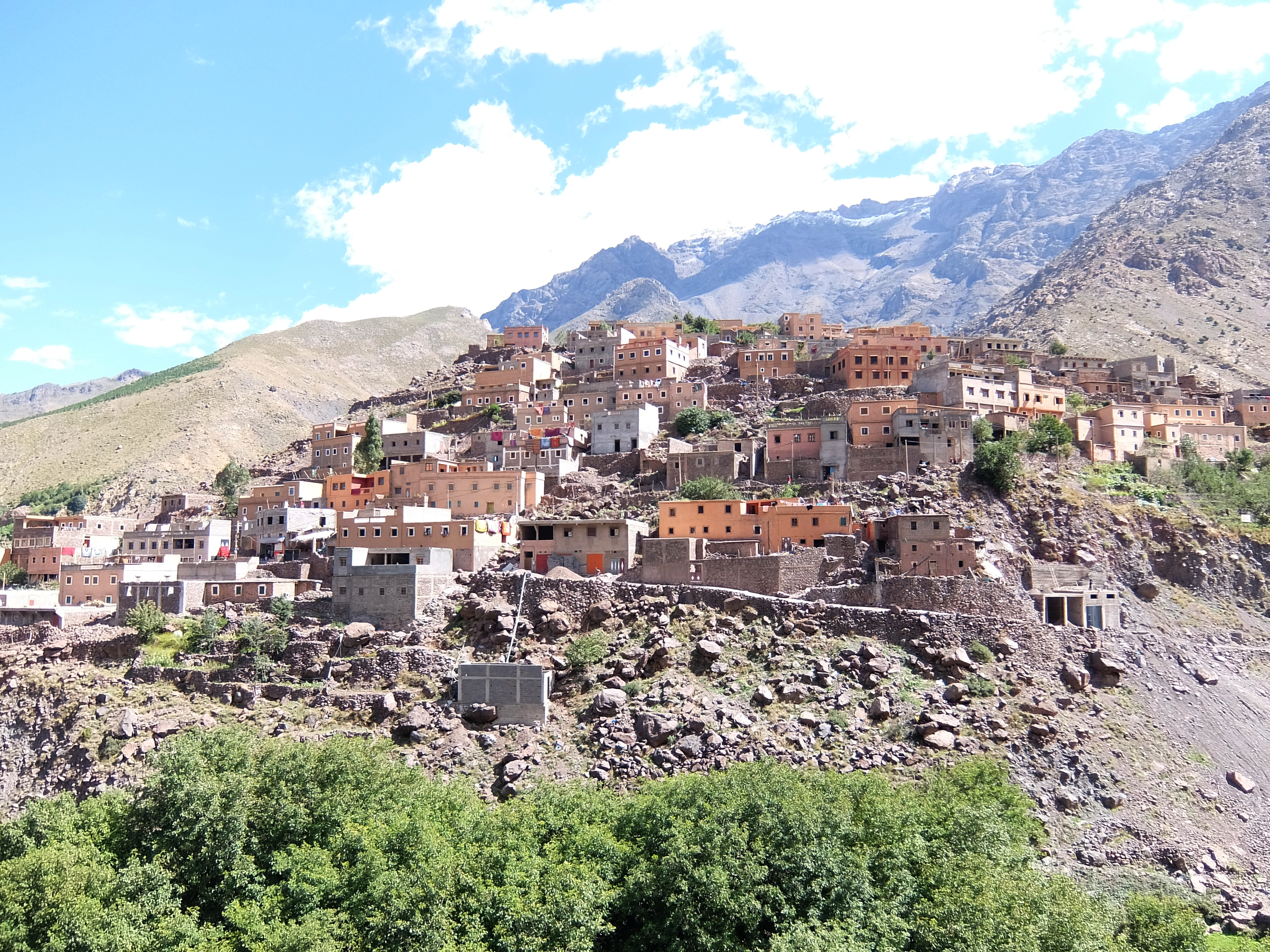
- View of Aroumd in 2018.

- Location within Morocco
- Coordinates: 31.126°N 7.917°W
- Country: Morocco
- Region: Marrakesh-Safi
- Province: Al Haouz Province
- Time zone: UTC+0 (GMT)

Aroumd (pronounced "arr-umm-n-d", also spelt Armed, Around, Arempt) is a small Amazigh village in the Ait Mizane Valley of the High Atlas Mountains of Morocco. Its population is around 1,900. Its altitude is 1900 m above sea level. Aroumd is 40 minutes' walk up the valley from Imlil, and is quieter and seen as more traditional. Aroumd is the highest village in the Ait Mizane Valley and so forms a good base for summitting Mount Toubkal, the highest peak in North Africa. The route into Toubkal passes by Aroumd which is in Toubkal National Park.

Village life is organised primarily by the Association pour le Developpement d'Armed, which is a charity formed by the elders of the village. Recent projects have included resurfacing and widening the mountain roads, and getting electricity and running water to all the houses in the village.
