= Mediterranean High Atlas juniper steppe =

Terrestrial ecoregion in Morocco

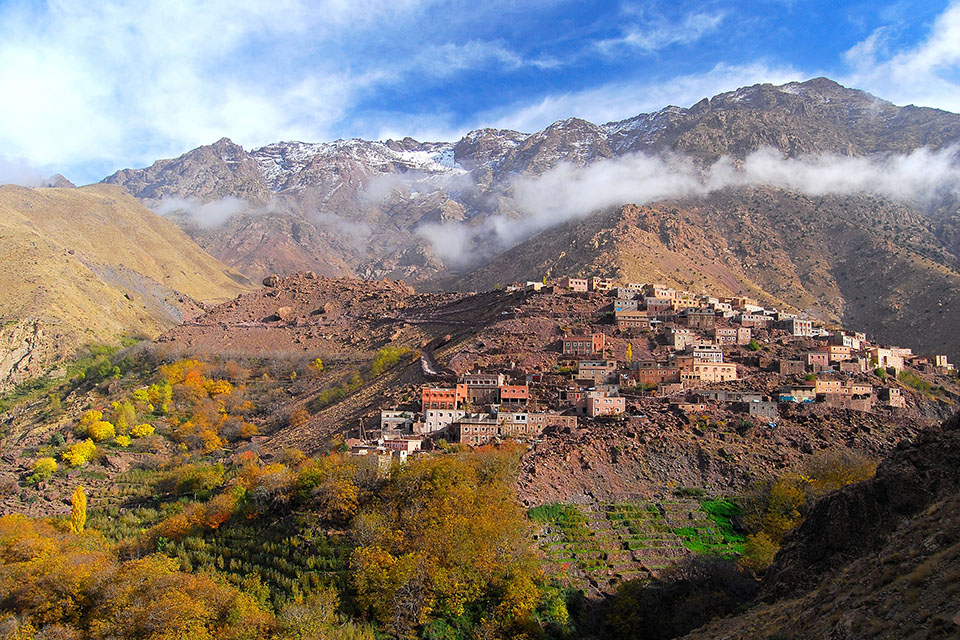
- Jebel Toubkal

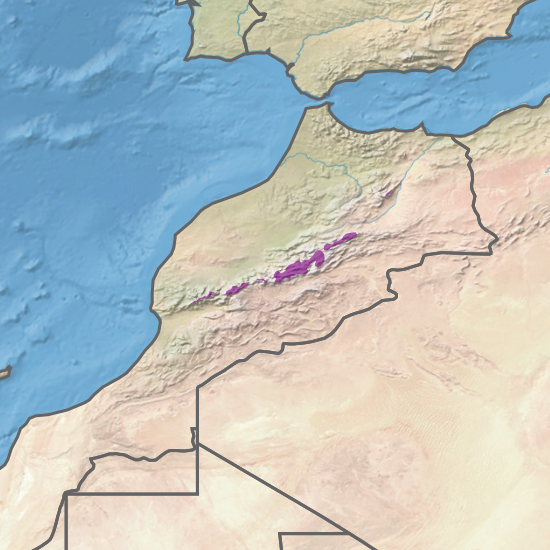
- Map of the ecoregion

Ecology
- Realm: Palearctic
- Biome: montane grasslands and shrublands
- Borders: Mediterranean conifer and mixed forests; Mediterranean woodlands and forests

Geography
- Area: 6,328 km^{2} (2,443 mi^{2})
- Country: Morocco

Conservation
- Conservation status: Vulnerable
- Protected: 1,682 km^{2} (27%)

The Mediterranean High Atlas juniper steppe is a montane grasslands and shrublands ecoregion in Morocco. It extends along the High Atlas range of northwestern Africa's Atlas Mountains.

== Geography ==
The ecoregion extends from 2700 meters elevation up to 4167 meters elevation on Toubkal, which is the highest peak in North Africa.

== Climate ==
The ecoregion has a temperate montane climate. Average annual precipitation varies from 200 to 600 mm, and up to 1000 mm in the wettest areas. North-facing slopes are generally cooler and more humid, and snow can persist as long as seven months above 3500 meters elevation. South-facing slopes are generally more arid, and are exposed to drying winds from the Sahara.

== Flora ==
Open woodlands of juniper (Juniperus thurifera) and evergreen holm oak (Quercus rotundifolia) are the characteristic plant community, extending up to the treeline at approximately 3200 meters. The critically endangered Moroccan cypress (Cupressus atlantica) has been reduced to a few hundred trees scattered in the western portion of the range. Thorny and cushion shrubs cover the ground, including Cytisus balansae, Erinacea anthylis, Prunus prostrata, and Astragalus armatus.

Denser stands of oaks and junipers have an understory of shade-loving shrubs including Fraxinus dimorpha, Lonicera arborea, Crataegus lacinata, Buxus sempervirens, and Berberis vulgaris australis, interspersed with the tall shrubs Juniperus oxycedrus and Ephedra nebrodensis and herbaceous plants Cephalantera rubra, Helleborine latifolia, Festuca triflora, and Festuca rubra.

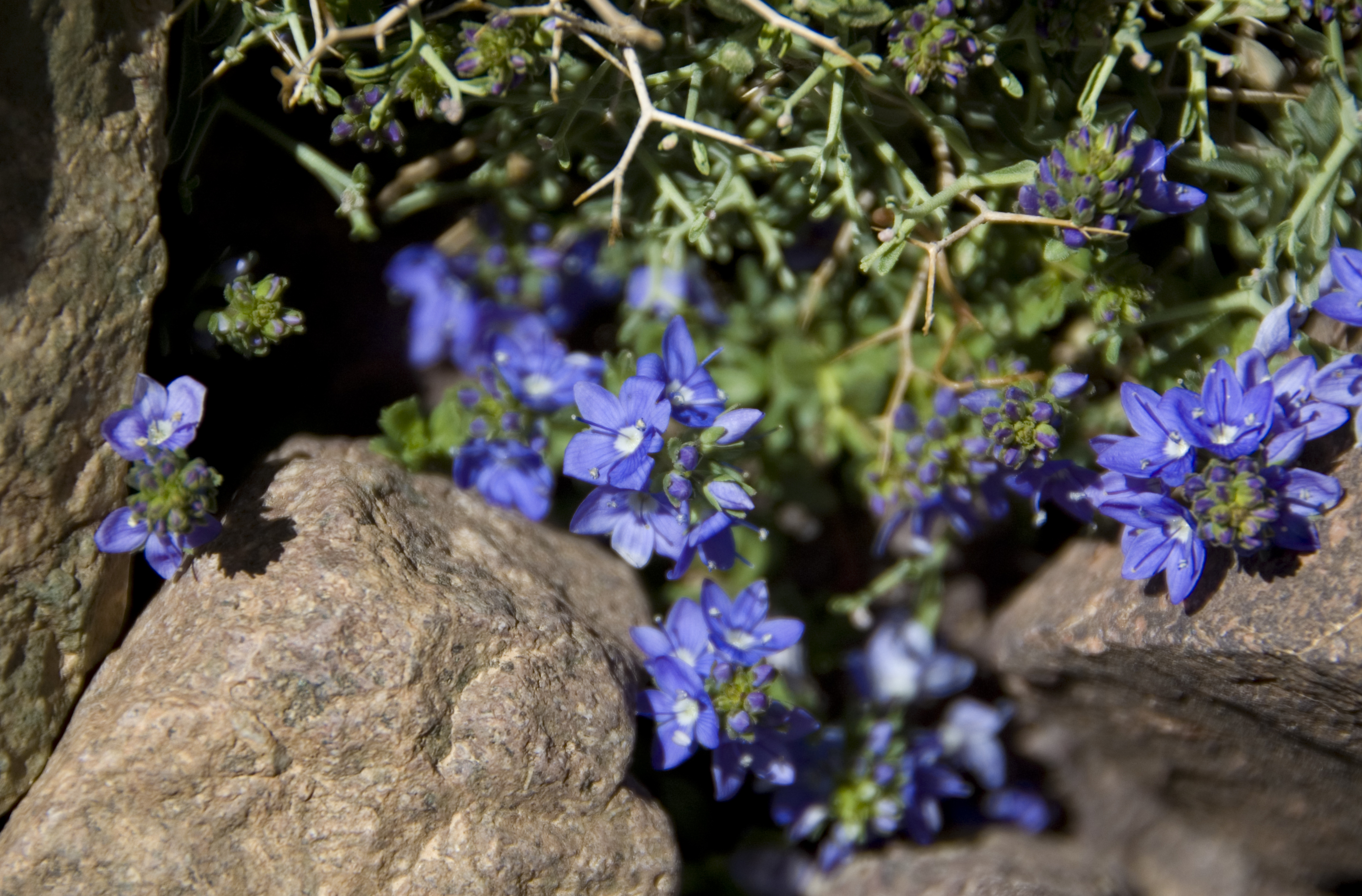
Flowers on Jebel Toubkal

Open grasslands cover ridgelines, and extend from the treeline to the summits, interspersed with areas of bare rock. These high meadows are adapted to strong winds and alpine conditions, and include Avena montana, Festuca mairei, Festuca alpina, and Ranunculus geraniifolius.

At lower elevations, the juniper and oak woodlands transition to evergreen broadleaf forests, which extend up to 2800 meters elevation on humid north-facing slopes, and xeric conifer forests extend from 1500 meters elevation up to 3100 meters on drier south-facing slopes.

== Fauna ==
The High Atlas is home to the Barbary leopard (Pathera pardus panthera) and Barbary sheep (Ammotragus lervia). Other mammals include red fox (Vulpes vulpes), golden jackal (Canis aureus), wild boar (Sus scrofa), Barbary ground squirrel (Atlantoxerus getulus), Egyptian mongoose (Herpestes ichneumon), crested porcupine (Hystrix cristata), and European polecat (Mustela putorius).

Native birds include the alpine accentor (Prunella collaris) and rufous-tailed rock thrush (Monticola saxatilis). Toubkal National Park is home to breeding population of white-rumped swift (Apus caffer), as well as African crimson-winged finch (Rhodopechys alienus) and Moroccan horned lark (Eremophila alpestris atlas).

Reptiles endemic to the High Atlas include the Atlas day gecko (Quedenfeldtia trachyblepharus), Quedenfeldtia moerens, Atlas dwarf lizard (Lacerta andreanskyi), Atlas mountain skink (Chalcides montanus), and Atlas mountain viper (Vipera monticola).

== Protected areas ==
Protected areas include Toubkal National Park and Haut Atlas Oriental National Park.
