= Segonzac =

Segonzac may refer to the following places and people in France:

== Places ==
- Segonzac, Charente, a commune in the department of Charente
- Segonzac, Corrèze, a commune in the department of Corrèze
- Segonzac, Dordogne, a commune in the department of Dordogne

== People ==
- André Dunoyer de Segonzac (1884–1974), a French painter
- René de Segonzac (1867-1962), French army officer and explorer
