= René de Segonzac =

Marquis Édouard Marie René Bardon de Segonzac
- Born: 7 September 1867; Cuy, Oise, France
- Died: 27 March 1962 (aged 94); Woluwe-Saint-Lambert, Belgium
- Military career
- Allegiance: France
- Branch: French Army
- Conflicts: Occupation of Ivory Coast; French operations in Morocco; First World War
- Awards: Legion of Honour; Croix de Guerre

Marquis Édouard Marie René Bardon de Segonzac (7 September 1867 – 27 March 1962) was a French army officer and explorer. He studied at the École Spéciale Militaire de Saint-Cyr before being commissioned and serving in the Ivory Coast where he was accused and acquitted of the murder of a fellow officer in the Quiquerez-Segonzac affair(fr). He became renowned as an explorer and adventurer in Morocco and was also posted to Tunisia. In the First World War, he became a pilot and received the Legion of Honour and the Croix de Guerre.

== Early life ==
Édouard Marie René Bardon de Segonzac was born in the Château des Essarts in Cuy, Oise on 7 September 1867. His parents were the aristocratic Édouard and Mathilde des Rioul de Segonzac. He entered military service in 1886, studying at the École Spéciale Militaire de Saint-Cyr and being in the first class to graduate from the Châlons-en-Champagne campus in 1889. Upon receiving his commission he joined the cavalry and served in the occupation of San Pédro on the Ivory Coast in 1892. In October 1893, he was tried for the murder of Lieutenant Paul Quiquerez(fr) but was acquitted of all charges against him.

De Segonazac obtained leave from the army to travel in Morocco in 1899. Disguised as a pilgrim and with a guide disguised as a sharif he travelled from Tripoli via Marrakech and the High Atlas mountains to Tazeroualt in the Sous region. An account of his travels, including more than 150 photographs, was published in 1901 as Excursion au Sous. The same year he determined to travel further in Morocco, resigning his army commission to do so.

De Segonzac went on to lead five geographical research expeditions to Morocco for the Comité de l'Afrique francaise including a return to Sous in 1901 and one to Southern Morocco and the western High Atlas in 1904. His second Sous expedition, made alone, went from the Rif via the Middle Atlas and Azrou to Moulouya. He then climbed the Jbel Ayachi before travelling to Taza and the Sebou valley, taking nine months. He carried out all of his expeditions in disguise as a Moroccan traveller. Further books included Voyages au Maroc (1899-1901) and Au Couer de l'Atlas, the latter of which included hundreds of photographs.

== First World War ==
During the First World War, de Segonzac served as a captain in the French military aviation corps. During the war he listed his address as Rue Dumont D'urville in Paris and in 1915 was posted to Chartres for a while. He was married and his wife, the Comtesse de Segonzac, resided in Compiegne. He remained a member of the Vieilles Tiges pilots association after the war. De Segonzac received the Legion of Honour and the Croix de Guerre during his military career and held several foreign decorations. He also held campaign medals for Tunisia and Morocco.

== Later life ==
De Segonzac became renowned as an explorer and adventurer and may have served as the inspiration for Lieutenant André de Saint-Avit in Pierre Benoit's Atlantida, in which one French officer murders another. He wrote La Légende de Florinda la Byzantine (The legend of Florinda the Byzantine) in 1928, illustrated by H. Zworykine and with a preface written by Marshal Hubert Lyautey. He also owned the largest colonial agricultural property in French Morocco, along the Sebou valley, of a surface of 11,000 hectares, under the Compagnie du Sebou.
