= Salmo akairos =

Conservation status
- Vulnerable (IUCN 3.1)

Scientific classification
- Kingdom: Animalia
- Phylum: Chordata
- Class: Actinopterygii
- Division: Teleostei
- Order: Salmoniformes
- Family: Salmonidae
- Genus: Salmo
- Species: S. akairos

Binomial name
- Salmo akairos Delling & Doadrio, 2005

Species of fish

Salmo akairos, known as Moroccan trout or Ifni trout is a species of trout, a salmonid fish, endemic to Lake Ifni, a lake less than one square kilometre in size located at an altitude of 2,300 m (7,500 ft) in Morocco.

The Ifni Trout can be identified by the marmorations (marble pattern) along its dorsal region. Its ventral fins are accented with black and white tips.
