= Afella =

Mountain in Morocco

Highest point
- Elevation: 4,043 m (13,264 ft)

Geography
- Location: Al Haouz Province, Marrakesh-Safi, Morocco
- Parent range: High Atlas

Afella is a mountain located in the Western High Atlas range in Morocco. Its highest peak is at 4043 metres.

Toubkal National Park with Afella, west of Toubkal
