= Jbel Igdet =

Mountain in Morocco

- Location within Morocco

Highest point
- Elevation: 3,619 m (11,873 ft)
- Prominence: 1,614 m (5,295 ft)
- Listing: Ultra and Ribu
- Coordinates: 30°57′53″N 8°26′37″W

Geography
- Country: Morocco
- Region: Marrakesh-Safi
- Parent range: High Atlas Range

Jbel Igdet (Arabic: جبل عقدت) is a mountain located in the Western High Atals range in Morocco. It is the westernmost ultra-peak of the Atlas Mountains. Its highest peak is 3,619 m (11,873 ft).
