= M'Goun =

Mountain in Morocco

M'Goun جبال مكون, ⵉⵖⵉⵍ ⵎⴳⵯⵓⵏ
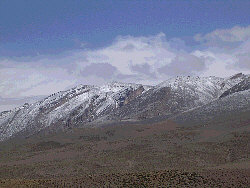
- Ighil M'Goun

Highest point
- Elevation: 4,071 m (13,356 ft)
- Prominence: 1,904 m (6,247 ft)
- Listing: List of Ultras of Africa, Ribu
- Coordinates: 31°30′30″N 6°26′36″W

Geography
- Location within Morocco
- Location: Drâa-Tafilalet, Morocco
- Parent range: High Atlas Range

The M'Goun mountain, also rendered as Ighil Mgoun / Ighil M’Goun / Irhil M’Goun (in tifinagh ⵉⵖⵉⵍ ⵎⴳⵯⵏ), Ighil n’Oumsoud, Jebel Mgoun, Jebel Ighil M’Goun and Jebel Aït M’goun, at 4,071 metres (13,356 ft) is the third highest peak of the Atlas Mountains after Toubkal and Ouenkrim.

It is an ultra prominent peak located in the Drâa-Tafilalet region of Morocco.

An area of 5,370 km^{2} in the region was designated as a UNESCO Global Geopark in 2015, having become a member of the Global Geopark Network the previous year. The Geopark showcases tectonic structures within the Atlas Mountains as well as aspects of the area's cultural history.

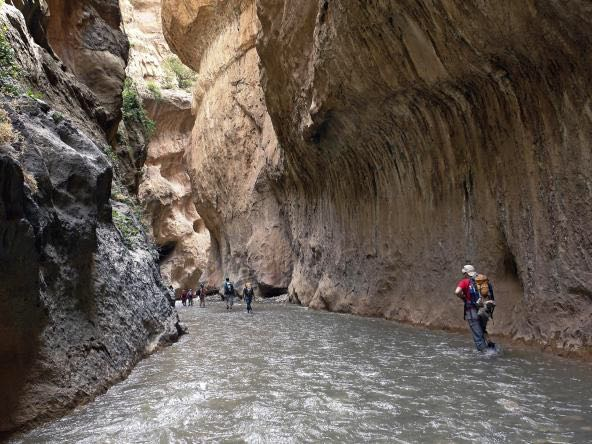
Hiking in Mgoun Canyon

== See also ==
- List of Ultras of Africa

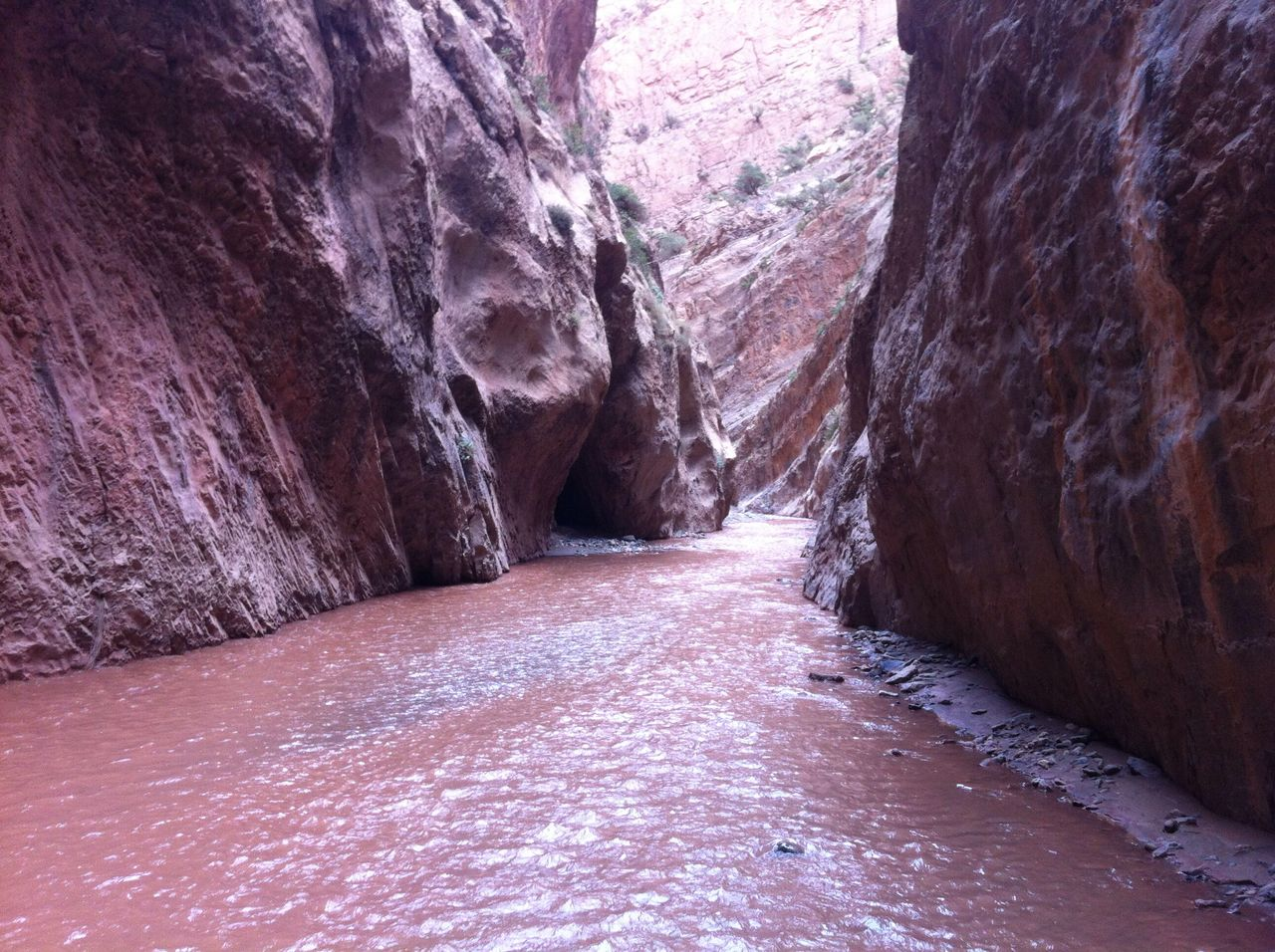
