= Iguidi =

- Rural commune and town
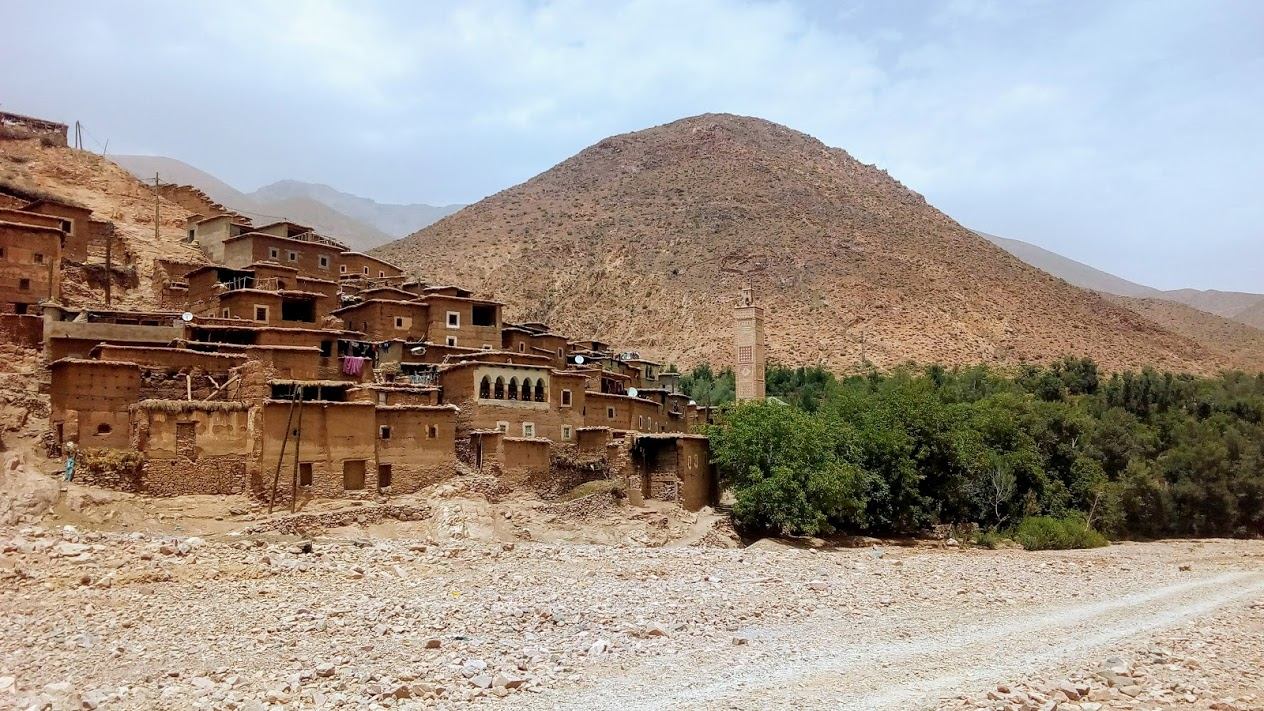
- Iguidi

- Location within Morocco
- Coordinates: 30°44′48″N 7°55′36″W
- Country: Morocco
- Region: Souss-Massa-Drâa
- Province: Taroudant Province

Population (2004)
  - Total: 9,323
- Time zone: UTC+0 (GMT)

Iguidi is a small town and rural commune in Taroudant Province of the Souss-Massa-Drâa region of Morocco. At the time of the 2004 census, the commune had a total population of 9,323 people living in 1,350 households.
