= Ahl Tifnoute =

- Rural commune and town
- Location within Morocco
- Coordinates: 30.98406°N 7.860135°W
- Country: Morocco
- Region: Souss-Massa-Drâa
- Province: Taroudant Province

Population (2004)
  - Total: 6,339
- Time zone: UTC+0 (GMT)

Ahl Tifnoute is a small town and rural commune in Taroudant Province of the Souss-Massa-Drâa region of Morocco. At the time of the 2004 census, the commune had a total population of 6,339 people living in 937 households.
