= Cuy, Oise =

Cuy
- Commune
- Location of Cuy
- Location within France Location within Hauts-de-France
- Coordinates: 49°35′11″N 2°54′30″E
- Country: France
- Region: Hauts-de-France
- Department: Oise
- Arrondissement: Compiègne
- Canton: Thourotte
- Intercommunality: Pays des Sources

Government
  - Mayor (2020–2026): Michel Leroy
- Area^{1}: 4.33 km^{2} (1.67 sq mi)
- Elevation: 95 m (312 ft)
- Highest elevation: 161 m (528 ft)
- Lowest elevation: 49 m (161 ft)
- Population (2023): 215
  - Density: 49.7/km^{2} (129/sq mi)
- Time zone: UTC+01:00 (CET)
  - Summer (DST): UTC+02:00 (CEST)
- INSEE/Postal code: 60192 /60310
- ^{1} French Land Register data, which excludes lakes, ponds, glaciers > 1 km^{2} (0.386 sq mi or 247 acres) and river estuaries.

Cuy (French pronunciation: [kɥi]) is a commune in the Oise department in northern France.

== See also ==
- Communes of the Oise department
