= Ouanoukrim =

Mountain in Morocco

Ouanoukrim وانوكريم
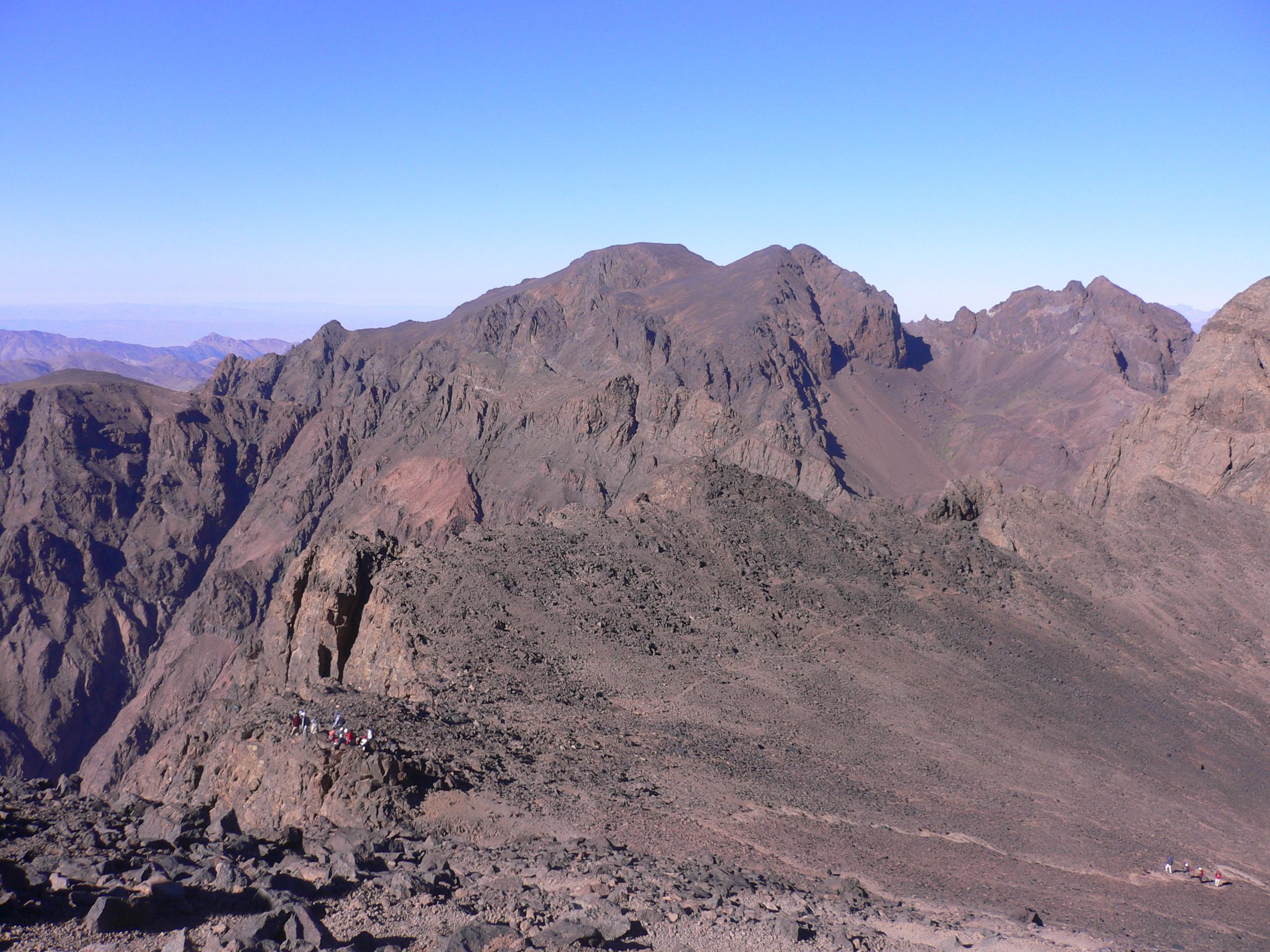
- The Ouenoukrim mountain as seen from Toubkal. The Timzguida summit is left and Ras Ouanoukrim right

Highest point
- Elevation: 4,089 m (13,415 ft)
- Prominence: 423 m (1,388 ft)
- Coordinates: 31°02′11″N 7°56′50″W

Geography
- Location: Toubkal National Park, Marrakesh-Safi, Morocco
- Parent range: High Atlas Range

Ouanoukrim (Arabic: وانوكريم, also Ouenkrim, ونكريم) is a mountain in Morocco located south of Marrakesh. It has two summits, Timzguida (4,089 m or 13,415 ft) and Ras Ouanoukrim (4,083 m or 13,396 ft), which are the second and third highest peaks of the Atlas range.

Toubkal National Park, with (Ras) Ouanoukrim
