= Jbel Ayachi =

Mountain in Morocco

Jbel Ayachi جبل العياشي
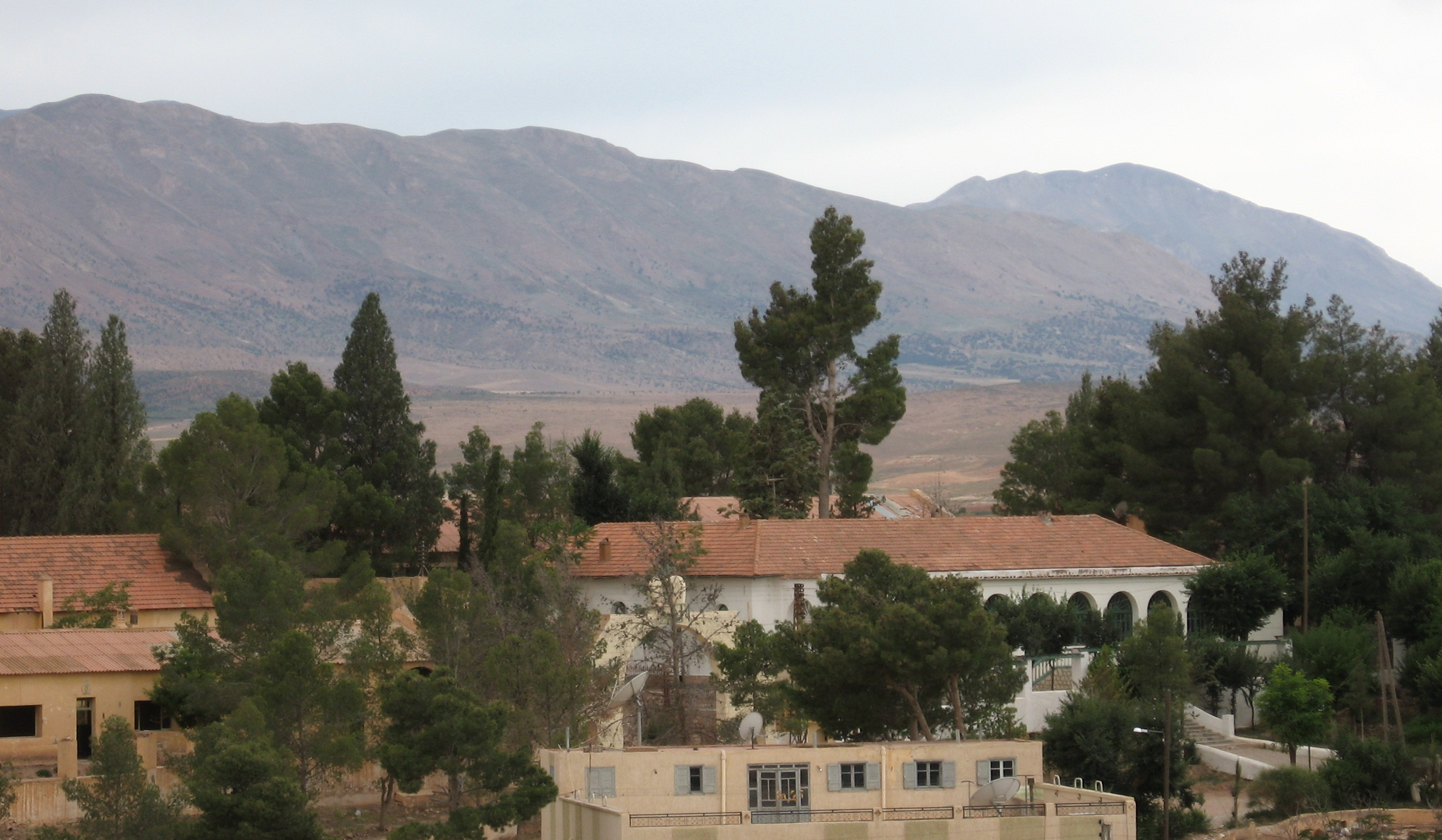
- Jbel Ayachi looms over the town of Midelt

Highest point
- Elevation: 3,757 m (12,326 ft)
- Prominence: 1,400.01 m (4,593.2 ft)
- Coordinates: 32°28′40″N 04°55′37″W

Geography
- Location: Midelt Province, Morocco
- Parent range: Atlas Mountains

Climbing
- First ascent: Unknown

Jbel Ayachi (Arabic: جبل العياشي) is one of the highest mountains in North Africa, and anchors the Eastern High Atlas in central Morocco. Jbel Ayachi rises to a height of 3,757 m above sea level.

This mountain area provides a habitat to the bearded vulture.

== Geography ==
Rather than denoting a single peak, Jbel Ayachi refers to a mountainous massif more than 20 kilometers in diameter. Conceptually a ring, the Ayachi region harbors a seasonal lake at its center and is surrounded by peaks and passes that often surpass 3000 m in elevation.

During the 20th century, American climbers erected a large metal cone to mark the peak. Jbel Ayachi's second-highest peak is located in the southeast.

Despite its proximity to the Sahara Desert, the peaks of Ayachi remain snow-covered and cold late into the year. Snow remains on most of the peaks until late May or early June, and in a few sheltered spots may survive the entire summer.

The government of Morocco published accurate topographical maps of the region in 1968, including contours, peaks, and some of the paths and springs. This can be purchased from the Division de Cartographie in major Moroccan cities. The Ayachi region is covered by the maps of the Midelt and Er-Rich districts.

=== Human geography ===
Formerly forested, the landscape has been severely affected by overgrazing. It is now dominated by sparse brush, loose stony soil, and sharply defined wadis and ravines. Nomadic Berbers have inhabited the mountains for many years, raising sheep and goats and remaining largely isolated from the sedentary farmers and market towns of the plains. These nomads often come into conflict with government foresters over the use of natural resources, especially trees.

The heart of the nomadic community in Ayachi is the village of Tarhirat, which has no permanent dwellings but is centrally located and well-watered.

== Features ==
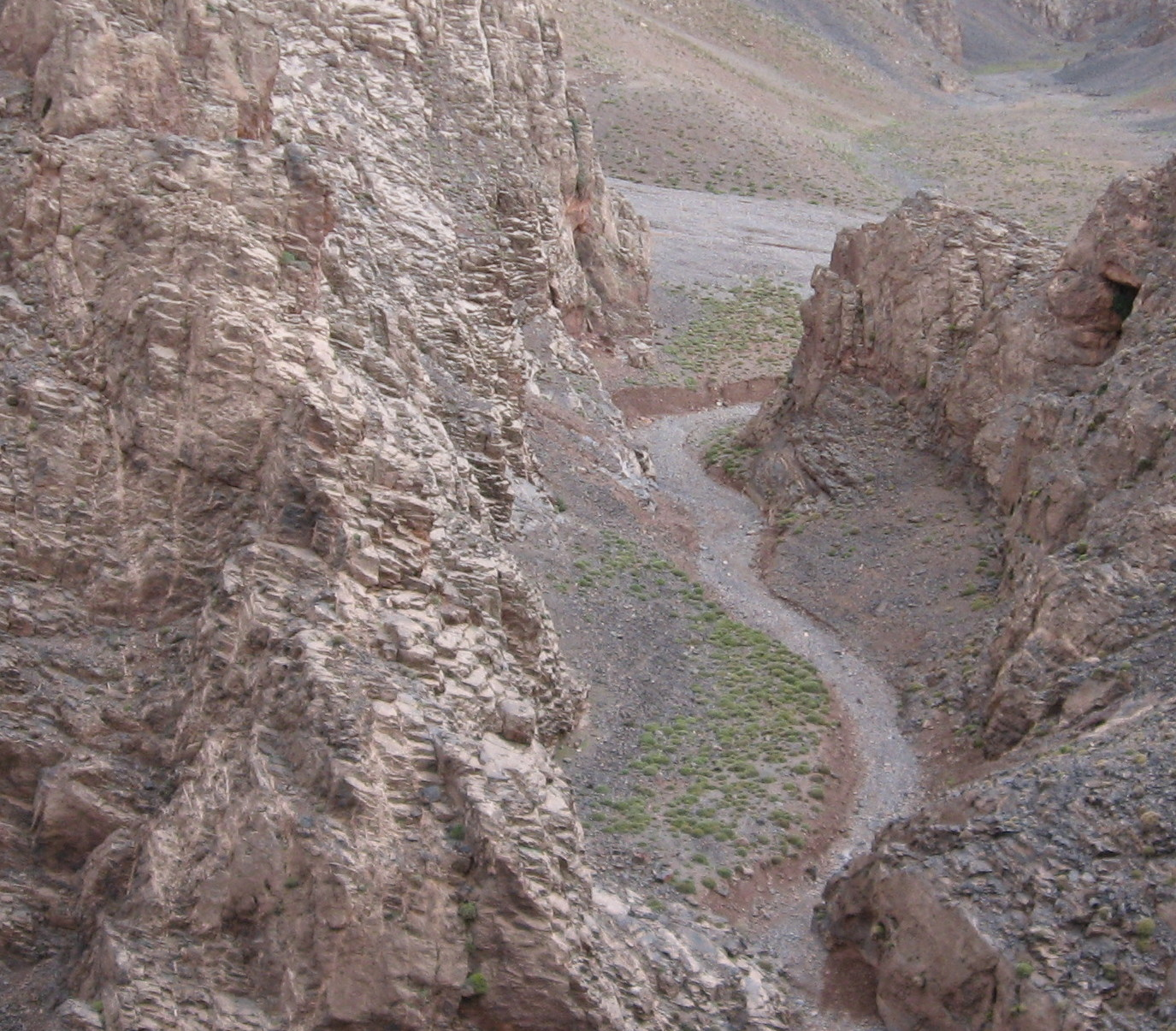
A ravine near Tarhirat in Jbel Ayachi

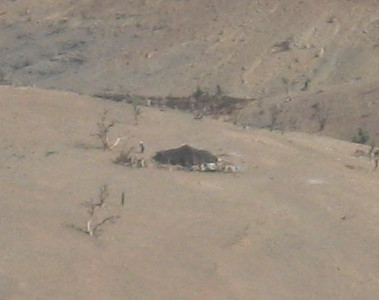
Berber tent in Wadi n'Ikis, Jbel Ayachi

== See also ==
- Moulouya River
- High Atlas
