= Toubkal National Park =

National park in Morocco

- IUCN category II (national park)
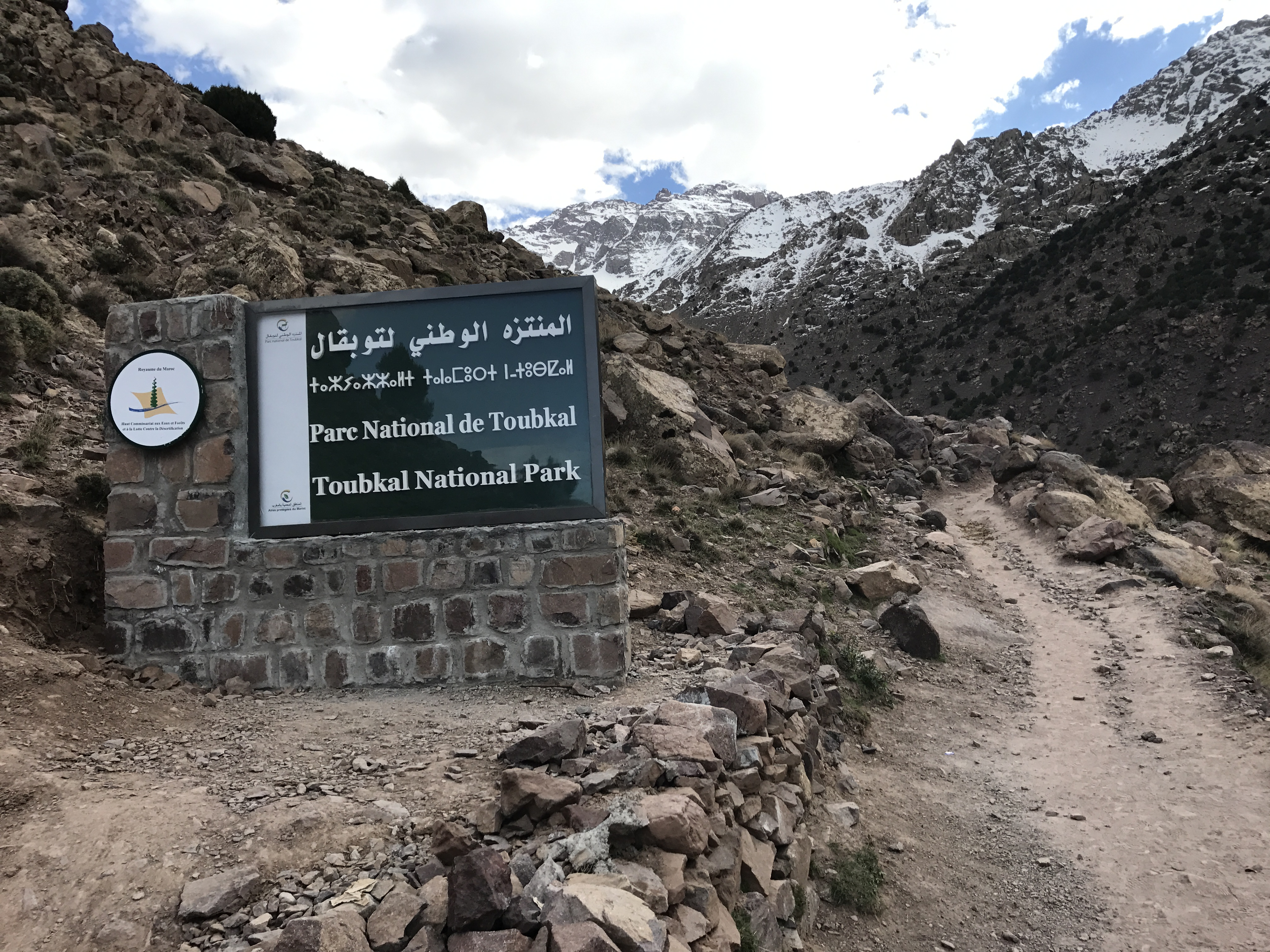
- Sign of the park
- Interactive map of Toubkal National Park
- Location: Morocco
- Coordinates: 31°5′N 7°50′W
- Area: 380 km^{2} (150 sq mi)
- Established: 1942

Toubkal National Park is a national park in the High Atlas mountain range, 70 kilometres from Marrakesh in central-western Morocco. Established in 1942, it covers an area of 380 km^{2}. Jbel Toubkal is the highest peak of the park at 4,167 metres.

== Main attractions ==
The Toubkal National Park offers many attractions to visitors. Climbing to the mountain peak takes two days and offers flowery landscapes in spring and colourful forests of cedar oaks and junipers in autumn. The Berber village of Imlil, surrounded by mountains, is a stop point to immerse oneself in the dwellers' simple lives. The ecomuseum of the Toubkal National Park showcases the history of the park and the ongoing projects about sustainability and protection of endangered species.

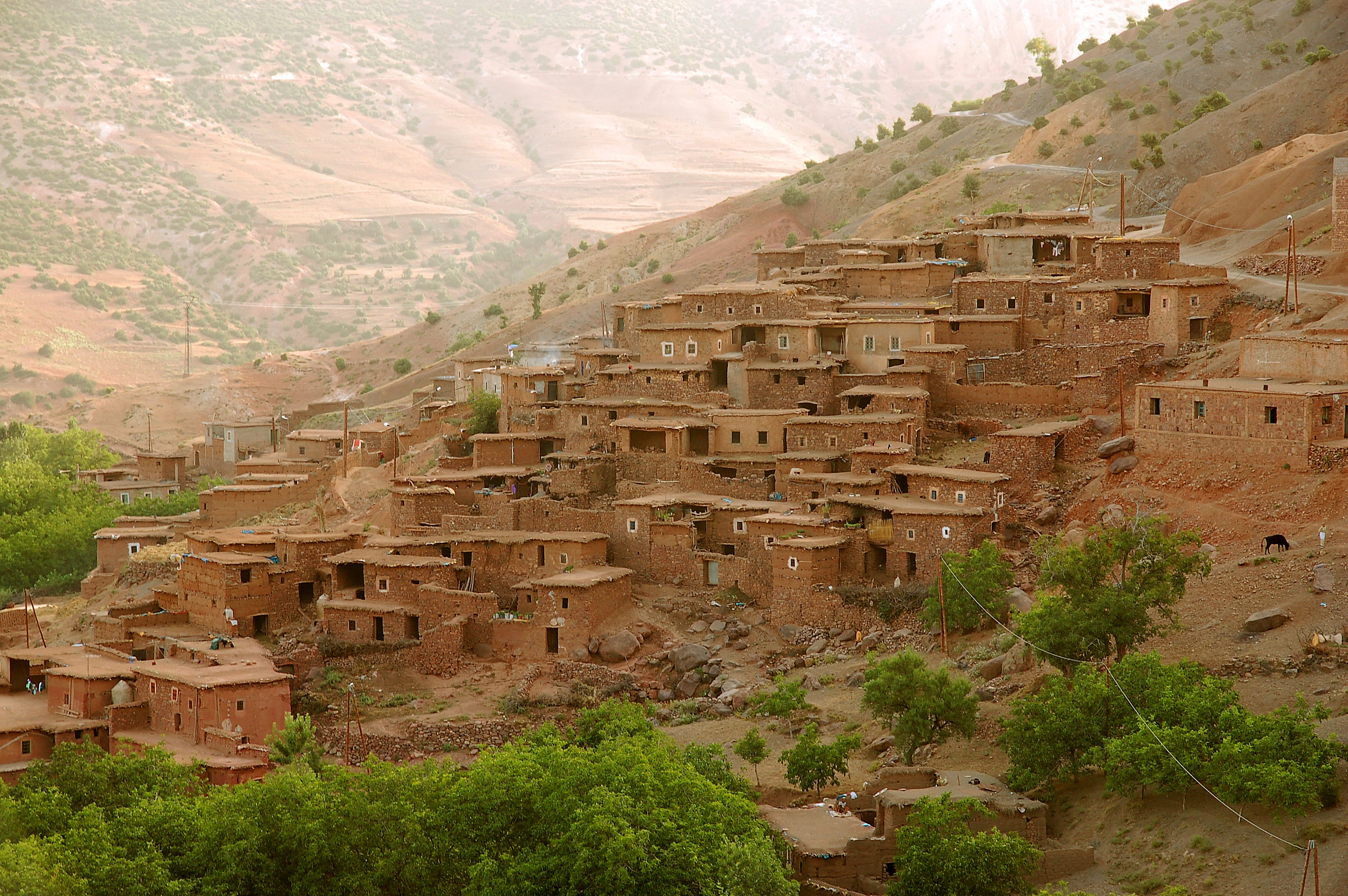
The village of Imlil

== Archaeological sites ==
In October 2012 Salafists were blamed for destroying an 8,000-year-old petroglyph within the park that depicted the Sun as a divinity.

== Geography ==
=== Important Bird Area ===
The park has been designated an Important Bird Area (IBA) by BirdLife International because it supports significant populations of Barbary partridges, Levaillant's woodpeckers, subalpine, Sardinian, spectacled and Tristram's warblers, Moussier's redstarts, and black-eared and black wheatears.

=== Mountains ===
Toubkal National Park

The park contains the following mountains:

- Toubkal (4167 m)
- Ouanoukrim (4089 m )
- Plateau de Tazarhart (3995 m)
- L'Aksoual ( 3910 m)
- Ineghmar (3892 m)
- Bou Iguenouane (3882m)
- Le Tichki (3753 m)
- Azrou Tamadout (3664 m)
