= High Atlas =

Mountain range in central Morocco

- Tizi N'Test

Highest point
- Peak: Toubkal
- Elevation: 4,167 m (13,671 ft)
- Coordinates: 31°03′43″N 7°54′58″W

Naming
- Native name: ⴰⴷⵔⴰⵔ ⵏ ⴷⵔⵏ (Tachelhit)

Geography
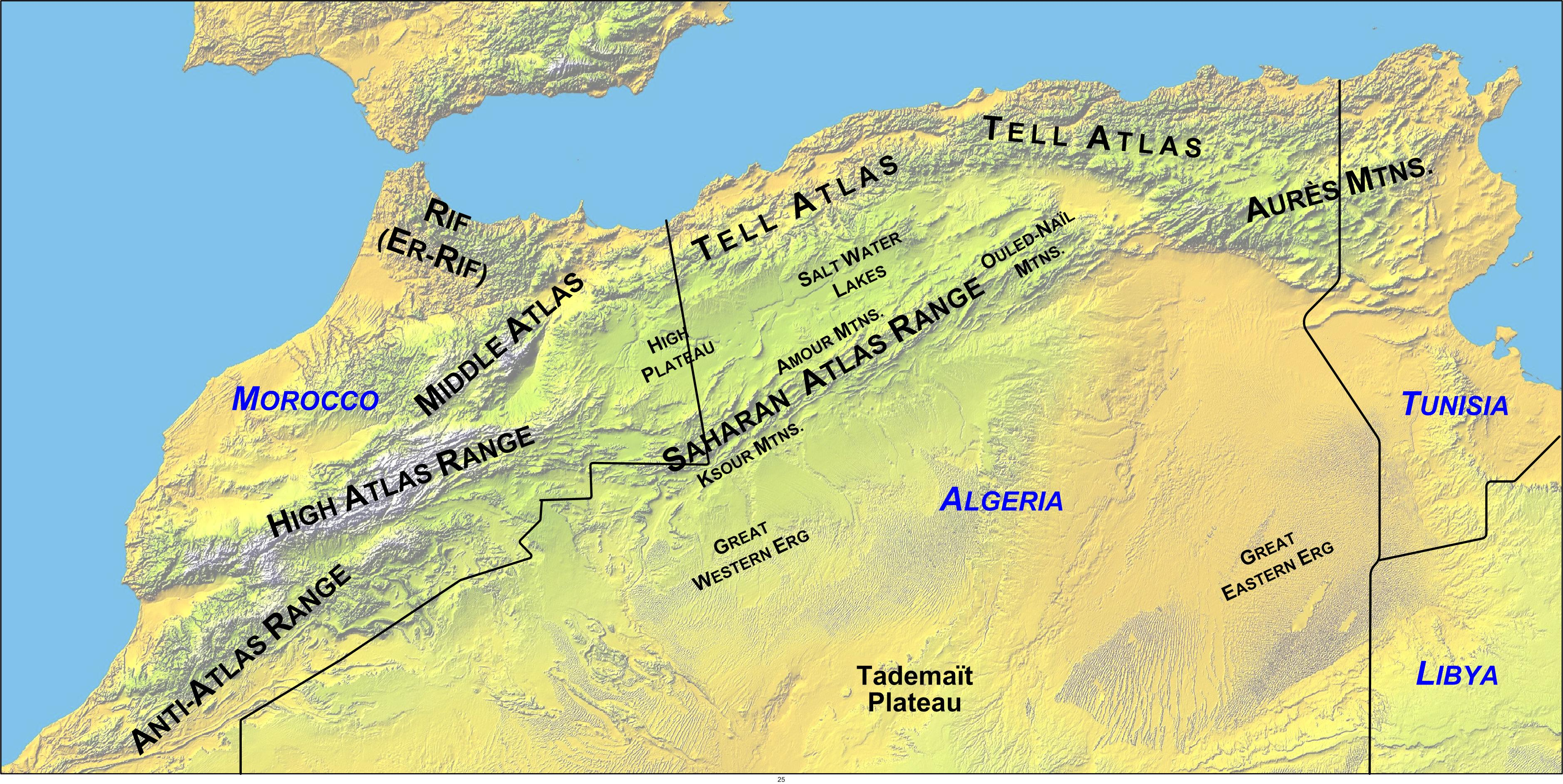
- Location of the High Atlas in North Africa
- Country: Morocco
- Range coordinates: 31°26′N 6°56′W
- Parent range: Atlas Mountain System

The High Atlas, also called the Grand Atlas, is a mountain range in central Morocco, North Africa, the highest part of the Atlas Mountains.

The High Atlas rises in the west at the Atlantic Ocean and stretches in an eastern direction to the Moroccan-Algerian border. At the Atlantic and to the southwest the range drops abruptly and makes an impressive transition to the coast and the Anti-Atlas range. To the north, in the direction of Marrakesh, the range descends less abruptly.

The range includes Jbel Toubkal, which at 4,167 m (2.589 miles; 13,671 ft) is the highest in the range and lies in Toubkal National Park. The range serves as a weather system barrier in Morocco running east–west and separating the Sahara from the Mediterranean and continental zones to the north and west. In the higher elevations of the massif, snow falls regularly, allowing winter sports. Snow lasts well into late spring in the High Atlas, mostly on the northern faces of the range. On the Western High Atlas, there is Oukaïmeden, one of three main ski stations in Morocco.

The High Atlas forms the basins for a multiplicity of river systems. The majority of the year-round rivers flow to the north, providing the basis for the settlements there. A number of wadis and seasonal rivers terminate in the deserts to the south and plateaux to the east of the mountains.

The High-Atlas Mountains are inhabited by Berbers, who live from agriculture and pastoralism in the valleys. In the steppe zone of the High-Atlas, where precipitations are low, the locals created a smart technique in managing the low precipitations and the weak soil. They turn the rather semi-arid lands into fertile valleys called locally by Agdal (garden in Berber). This technique has intrigued many Western agriculturalists, in which they were impressed by the high efficiency of this agricultural system. Many scientists, particularly French scientists, make yearly expeditions to observe the community and their living system.

== Climate ==
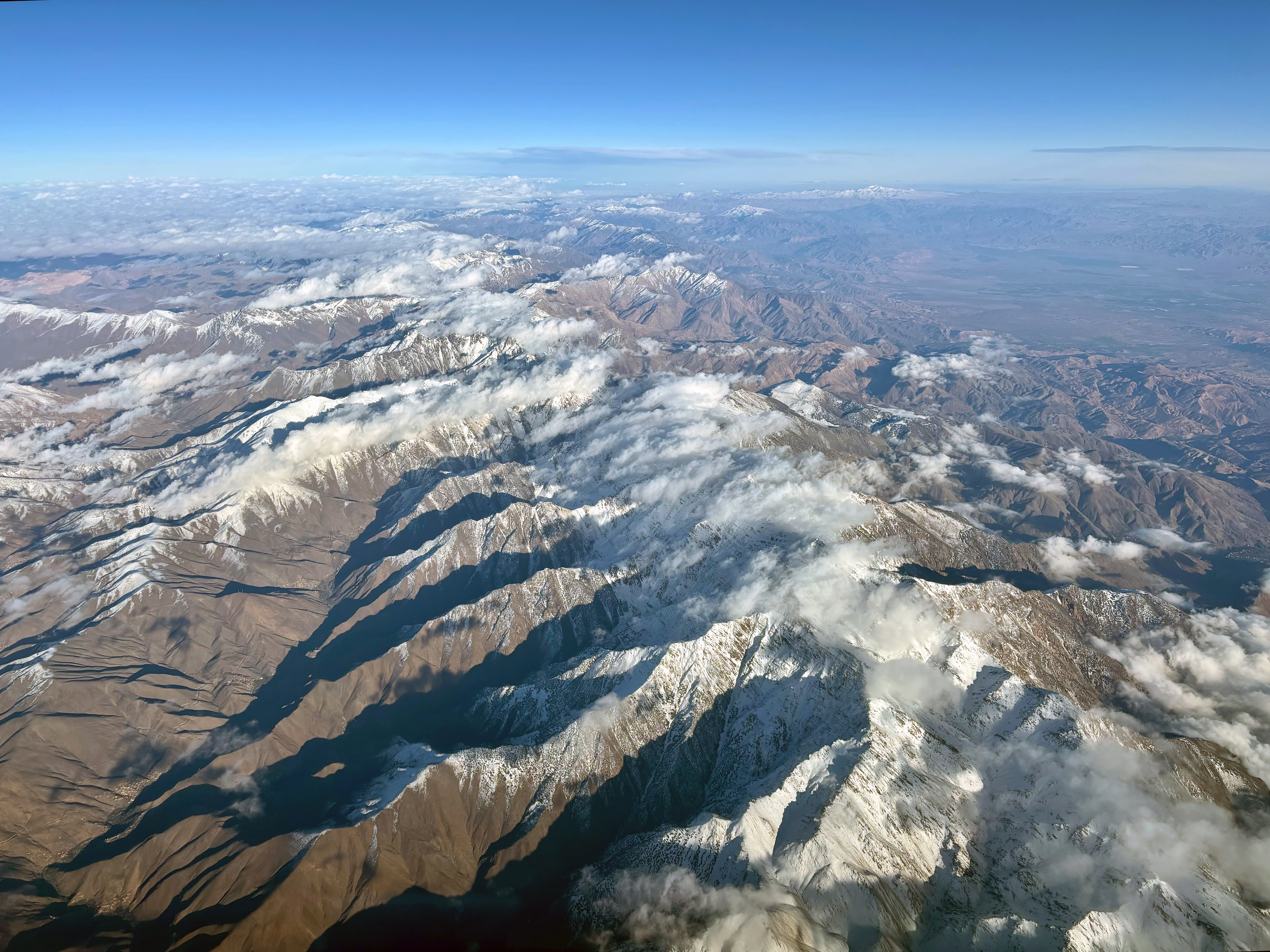
Aerial view of High Atlas

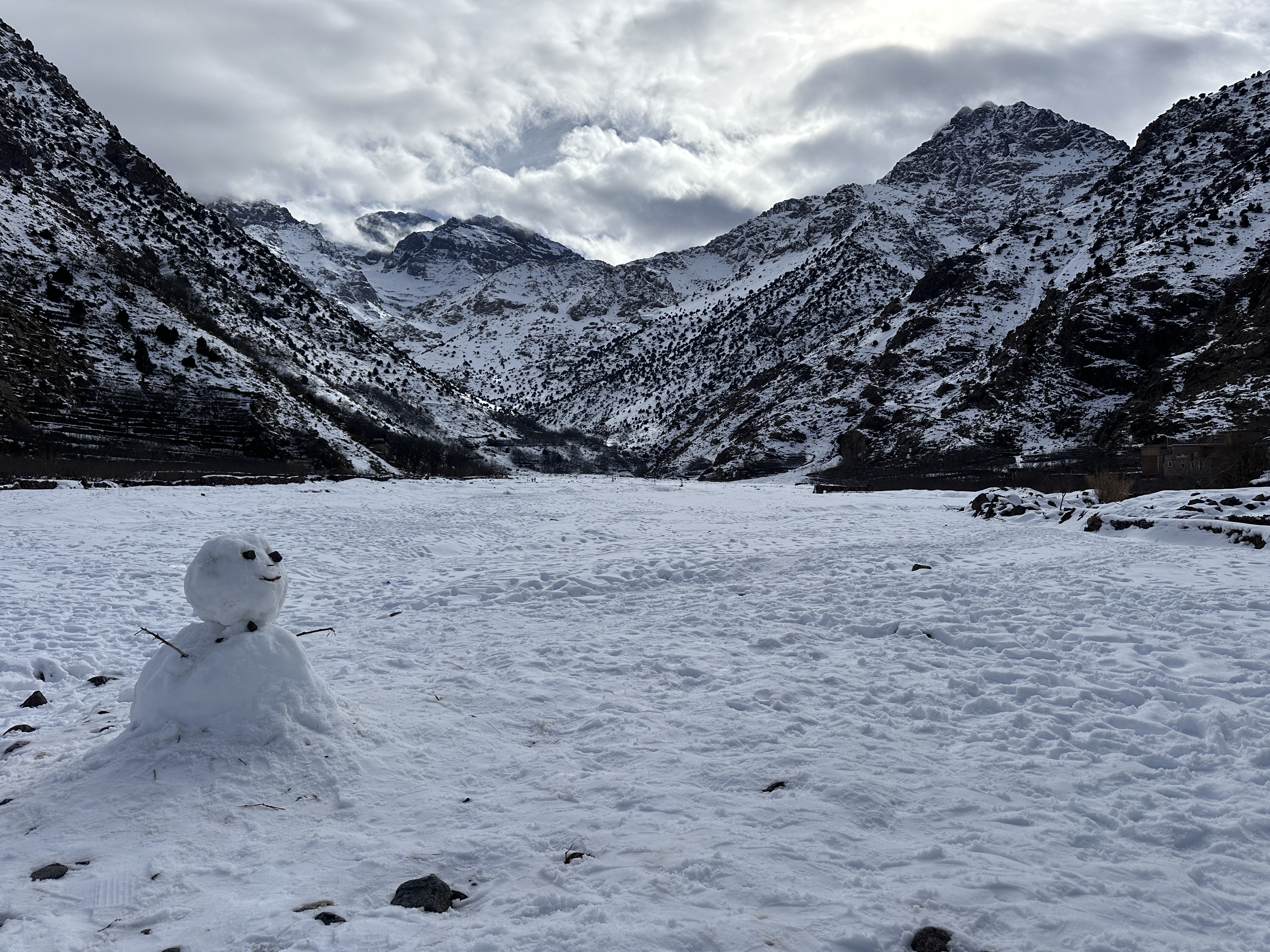
Snowman built by local children in the High Atlas Mountains

There are two types of Alpine Climates in the High Atlas:

- Mediterranean climate, dominates the north and south of the Western High Atlas until (Jbel Toubkal), as well as the northern part of Central High Atlas from Jbel Toubkal until Imilchil, owing to their exposition to the perturbations coming from the North Atlantic Ocean. These regions are relatively humid with irregular precipitations but occasionally torrential. The annual rainfall is between 600 and 1,000 mm (24 and 39 in). The drought in the summer months, interrupted by thunderstorms, is usually intense. Snow falls between November and April, but can persist from September to June in the peaks. Important rivers flow through the valleys (including Asif Melloul, Oued n'Fis, and Oued Tessaout) supply the fertile basins like Aït Bou Guemez and Imilchil. These conditions allow the existence of pine, oak and cedar forests. However, these forests are declining because of the reducing of annual precipitation, over-exploitation of the trees (used for construction and heating), and sheep-goat overgrazing.
- Continental semi-arid or steppe climate, and is present in the southern part of the Central High Atlas, from Toubkal to Imilchil, and the whole Oriental High-Atlas down of Imilchil. These regions are marked by variations in temperatures. It extends southward from the steppe lands into rocky desert. In addition, some localized valleys supplied by irrigation make agriculture possible. Forests are almost rare. This portion of High-Atlas is very similar to the Rocky Mountains in the western United States.

== Subdivisions ==
=== Western High Atlas ===
Western High Atlas

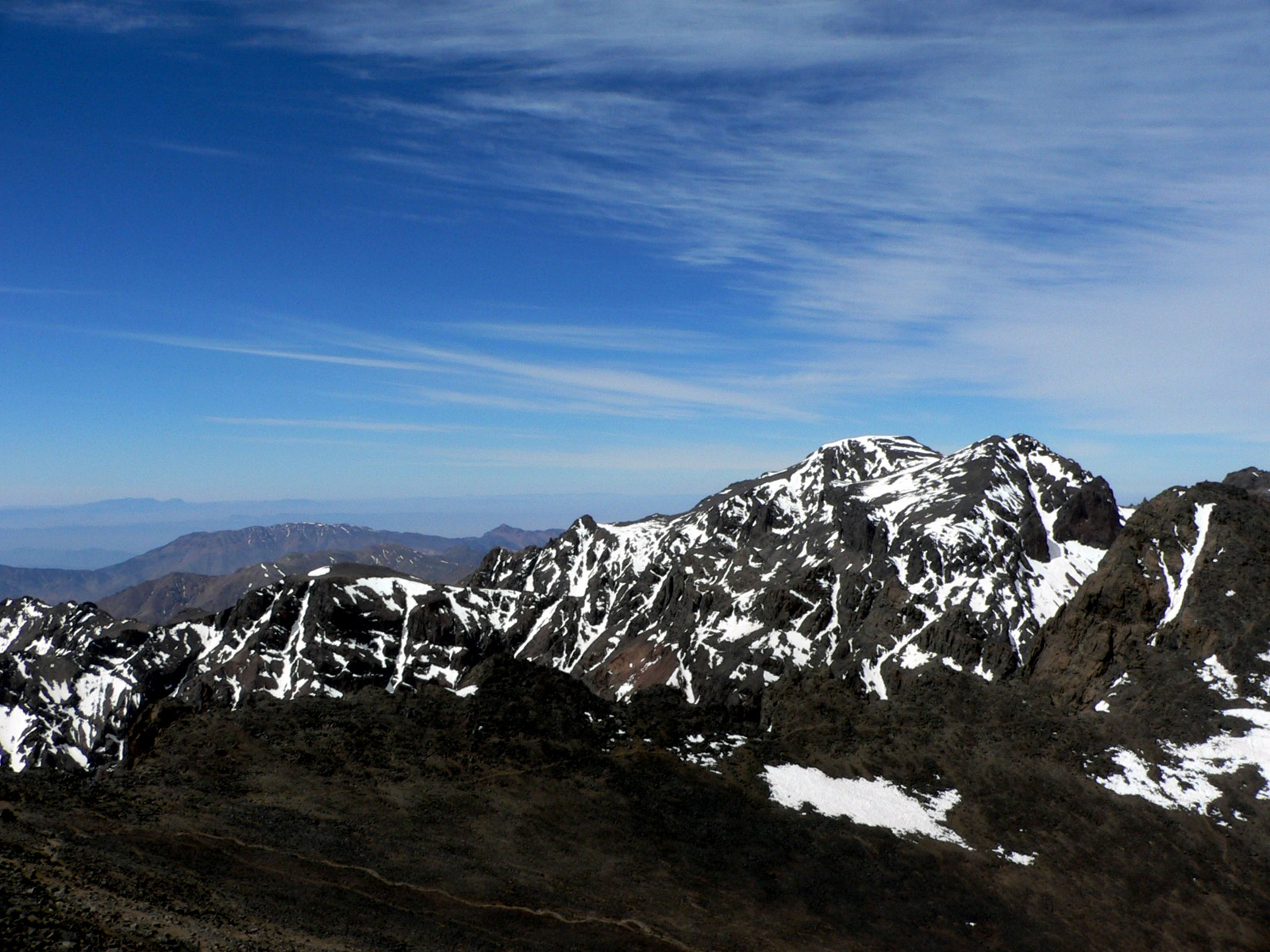
Jbel Toubkal in Toubkal National Park

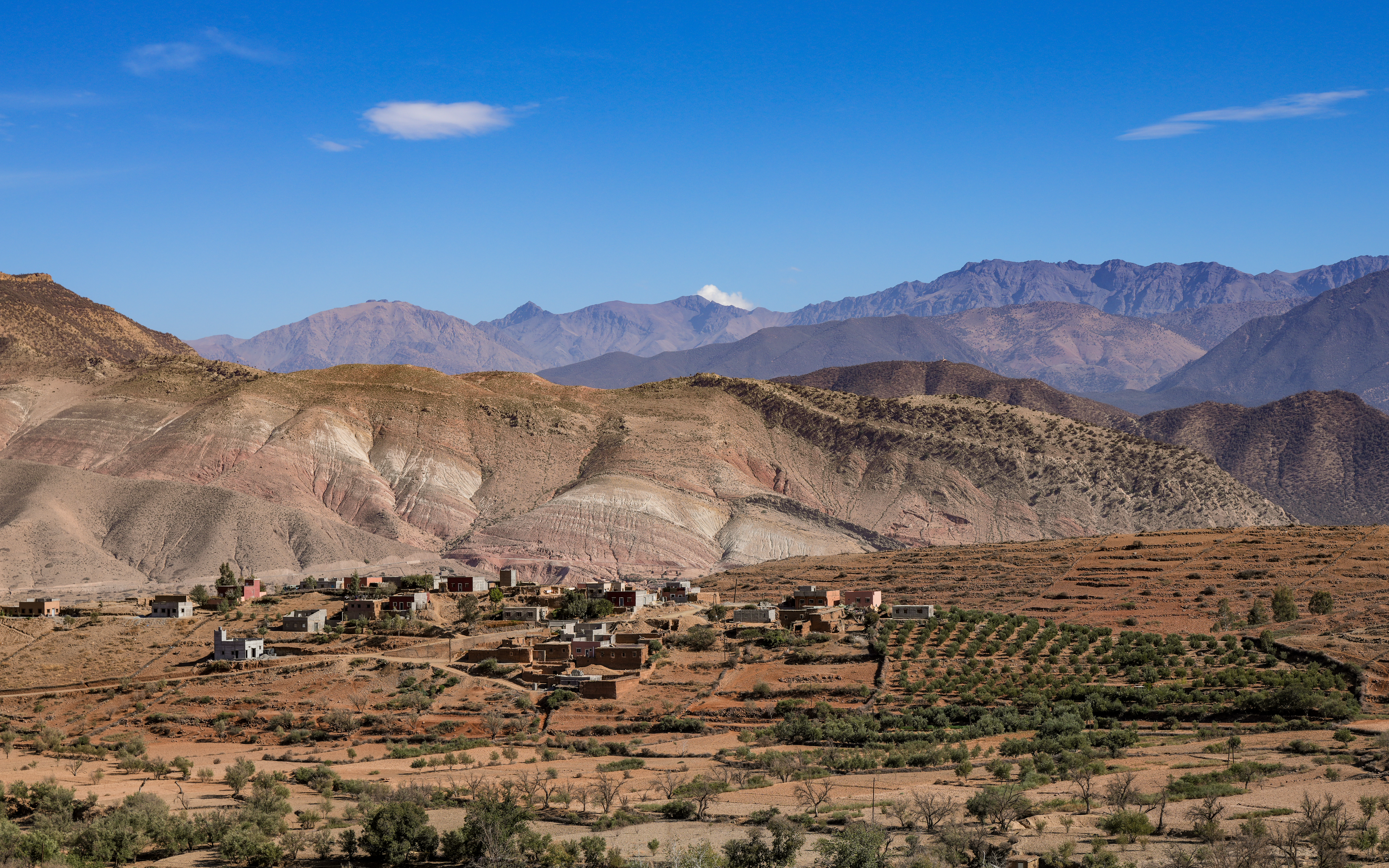
North face of the Western High Atlas near Ouirgane

In the west lies the oldest portion of the range. Its high point is the Jbel Toubkal, which is visible from the city of Marrakesh. Jbel Toubkal lies in the Toubkal national park, which was created in 1942. The massif consists of Jurassic and Cretaceous formations notched by deep erosion-carved valleys. This part of the range includes the Ourika Valley, which is the only location in the High Atlas where the endangered primate, the Barbary macaque, Macaca sylvanus, is found; however, this primate is also found in parts of the Middle Atlas and the Rif, as well as parts of Algeria. The Ourika Valley is also a location where a diverse flora was recorded as early as the 19th century.

=== Central High Atlas ===
A solid chalk mass morphologically dominated by tabular zones reaching an altitude of 2,500 m (8,200 ft) extends from Azilal to Ouarzazate. Here, the contrasting landscapes are similar to Colorado in the United States, with high plateaux, gorges and box canyons, and peaks sometimes splintered by erosion. Several peaks in this area exceed 4,000 m (13,000 ft), with Jbel Mgoun at 4068 m being the highest peak in this part of the High Atlas. The area is populated by Berbers.

=== Eastern High Atlas ===
Eastern High Atlas

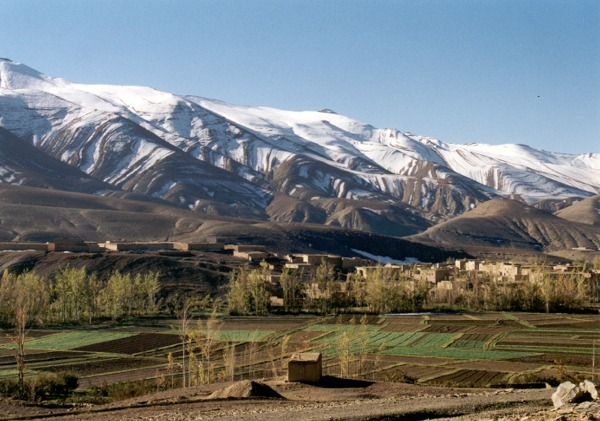
Village in the eastern High Atlas

The eastern part of the High Atlas forms vast plateaux at high altitude which provide the headwaters for the Moulouya River. It extends from the town of Khenifra. This portion of the range includes the solid mass of the Tamlelt whose northern edge is occupied by its higher peaks, such Jbel Ayachi at 3,747 m (12,293 ft). The altitude falls towards the east where the mountains join the pre-Saharan zone.

This massif became an internationally famous paleontological site after the discovery of the bones of a dinosaur called 'Atlasaurus', which populated Morocco 180 million years ago. This dinosaur is also named Tazoudasaurus, after the name of the village of Tazouda, where it was discovered. The creature, about 15 metres (49 feet) long, is postulated to be an ancestor of the Sauropoda found in America. Until 140 million years ago, the African and American continents were connected.

== Geology ==
The Atlas Mountains define an ENE-WSW trending intracontinental belt, resulting from the tectonic inversion of the Late Triassic to Middle Jurassic rift basin during the Cenozoic convergence between the African and Eurasian Plates. The Moroccan Atlas is formed by the ENE-WSW-striking High Atlas and the NE-SW-trending Middle Atlas. The former is divided into three segments named western, central, and eastern High Atlas.

The western High Atlas was part of the Atlantic Jurassic passive margin and is separated from the central and eastern High Atlas by the Paleozoic Massif, an area of pre-Mesozoic basement exposures located south of Marrakesh. The central and eastern High Atlas basin developed as a multiphase rift system opened toward the east by two major rift episodes occurring during Middle-Late Triassic and Early Jurassic (late Sinemurian and Pliensbachian. At present, the central High Atlas is characterized by a folded domain that is dominated by NE-SW striking structural highs or ridges separating elongated and wide synclines filled by Early and Middle Jurassic sediments.

Subordinate NW-SE trending structural highs bounding equal-trend synclines are also present. Cretaceous and later syntectonic Tertiary units are also locally present (e.g., Miocene-Pliocene La Cathédrale conglomerates and sandstones).

=== Triassic-Jurassic ===
During the Triassic, the central High Atlas extensional basin was characterized by the synrift deposition of red beds and localized evaporites capped by extensive basaltic lava flows.

Following the Triassic red bed deposition, marine conditions prevailed during the Early and Middle Jurassic resulting in the development of carbonate and mixed depositional systems. The Jurassic Atlas basin was open to the east (western Tethys realm) with Paleozoic provenance areas located toward the west and south. Liassic sedimentary systems evolved from extensive peritidal shallow water carbonate platforms (Hettangian-lower Sinemurian) that progressively backstepped toward the basin margins, to more localized platform development flanking the depocenters (Sinemurian).

Normal faulting and block tilting increased notably during Pliensbachian times, resulting in north to south compartmentalization of the basin. Pliensbachian carbonate platforms preferentially developed in the margins basin and in synsedimentary structural highs, promoting abrupt transitions in the marine sedimentary record from shallow water to basinal facies.

==== Toarcian ====
Global anoxia during the latest Pliensbachian and the earliest Toarcian occurred in close association with regional drowning of the lower Liassic platforms and localized deposition of basinal marls. From Toarcian times, carbonate platforms of the Azilal Formation developed in the margins of the central High Atlas basin, whereas the basin axis was occupied by a mixed carbonate-siliciclastic platform system prograding eastward to basinal deposits. This mixed system progressively graded to an extensive shallow water carbonate platform of the Anoual Formation, Bajocian to early Bathonian in age that is recognized throughout the central High Atlas.

=== Cretaceous ===
Finally, the middle Dogger to Lower Cretaceous red beds record the sedimentation of continental to shallow marine transitional deposits that characterize the central High Atlas domain. Fully marine environmental conditions and platform carbonate deposits, which locally crop out in the margins of the Atlas System, dominated between Aptian and Cenomanian times.

== Paleontology ==
Fossils of Mesozoic animals are known from High Atlas. Remains of sauropod dinosaurs Tazoudasaurus and Atlasaurus were found in the Toarcian and Bathonian deposits of this range, respectively. In 2023, a fossil of a hybodontiform Strophodus was collected from the Bajocian deposits of High Atlas. It's the oldest Gondwanan specimen of this genus at the time of discovery. The new species was named Strophodus atlasensis, after the mountain range where its holotype was found.

== Areas of interest ==
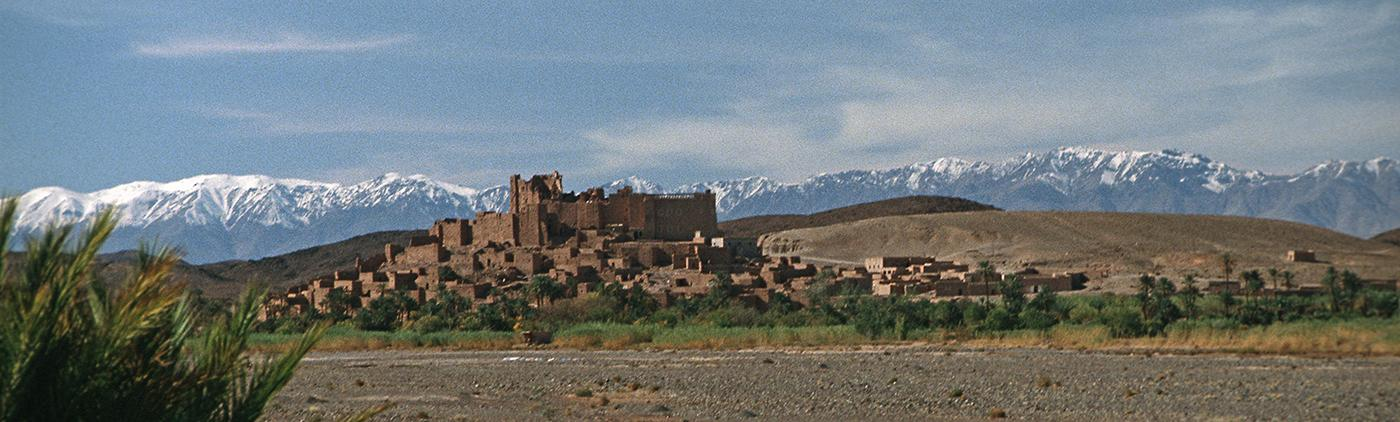
A Kasbah in the Dades valley, High Atlas

At the foot of the High Atlas one finds Aït Benhaddou, a ksar (Maghribi Arabic: قـصـر, romanized: qṣer, fortified village) still in use. The ksar is widely used in the film industry.

At approximately mid-range, the Amesfrane Rock Wall rises some 1,650 feet (500 m) from a dry riverbed wadi. The formation is composed of rounded columns patterned with horizontal ridges that occurred as a result of erosion, which caused travellers to nickname it "the Cathedral", for its resemblance to a gothic cathedral.

Among the summits at a height of 1,600 m (5,200 ft) height lies the Kasbah of Telouet on the road to Marrakesh. The canyons and ravines of the Dadès and the Todra are also points of interest.

== See also ==
- Mediterranean woodlands and forests
- Mediterranean conifer and mixed forests
- Mediterranean High Atlas juniper steppe
