= Toubkal =

Highest peak of the Atlas mountain range

Mt Toubkal
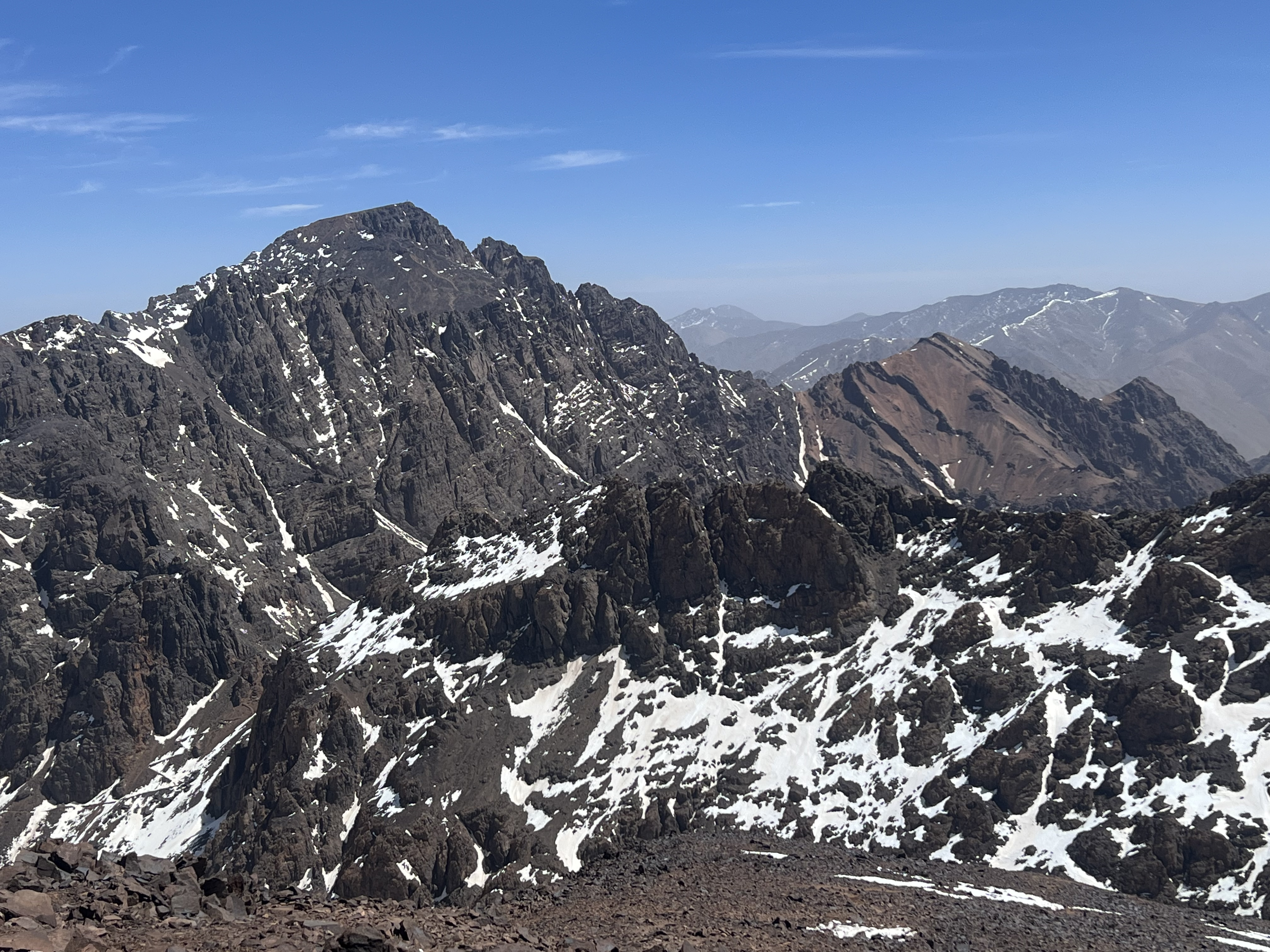
- Mt Toubkal from summit of Ouanoukrim

Highest point
- Elevation: 4,167 m (13,671 ft)
- Prominence: 3,755 m (12,320 ft); Ranked 36th
- Listing: Country high point List of Ultras of Africa; Ribu
- Coordinates: 31°03′35″N 7°54′54″W

Geography
- Location: Morocco
- Parent range: High Atlas mountains
- Topo map(s): Toubkal Massif Map and Guide

Climbing
- First ascent: 12 June 1923 by the Marquis de Segonzac, V. Berger, and H. Dolbeau
- Easiest route: South cwm (hike in summer)

Toubkal (Arabic: توبقال, romanized: tūbqāl, pronounced [tuːbqaːl]; Tamazight: ⵜⵓⴱⵇⴰⵍ Tubqal), also Jbel Toubkal or Jebel Toubkal, is a mountain in central Morocco, located in the Toubkal National Park. At 4,167 m (13,671 ft), it is the highest peak in Morocco, the Atlas Mountains, North Africa and the Arab world. Located 63 km (39 mi) south of the city of Marrakesh, and visible from it, Toubkal is an ultra prominent peak, the highest for over 2,000 km (1,200 mi). Toubkal is ranked 27th by topographic isolation.

The most common route to reach the summit of Toubkal starts from the village of Imlil in the High Atlas. The ascent typically takes two days and includes an overnight stay at a mountain refuge. The route is considered non-technical but requires good physical fitness due to the altitude.

Toubkal with the National Park

== Geography ==
Although much of the High Atlas consists of sedimentary rocks, the Toubkal massif is an area of volcanic rocks which have weathered into alpine crests, cut by deep, narrow valleys. To the south, the mountain drops steeply down for 1,800 metres (5,906 ft) to a small lake called Lac d'Ifni. To the west, the mountain's edge is marked by a pass, the Tizi n'Ouanoums at 3,664 metres (12,021 ft). From this pass, the mountain's W-S-W ridge rises up to Toubkal West, which forms a shoulder at 4,020 metres (13,189 ft) before continuing to the summit at 4,167 metres (13,671 ft).

The north and western sides of Toubkal drain down to the Mizane Valley, which has the passes of both Tizi n'Ouanoums and Tizi n'Ouagane at its head. Two hanging valleys on the western side of the mountain – the Ikhibi Nord and Ikhibi South – provide ready access for trekkers and climbers to reach Toubkal's summit. At one time the northern valley provided the normal route of ascent, but the construction of a mountain hut by the French Alpine Club below Ikhibi Sud now encourages trekkers to ascend via the southern route instead.

== Access ==
Toubkal is popular with trekkers and ski mountaineers, but less so with climbers, despite its ease of access and sunny climate. Trekkers usually approach the mountain from Marrakesh via the road-end village of Imlil, gateway to Mount Toubkal. Qualified guides can be hired, as well as porters, to carry equipment and food supplies higher into the mountains. It is a moderate hike and navigation is not a problem.

The normal route starts with a walk to the village of Aroumd. Beyond Aroumd, a floodplain is crossed and the route follows the left slope of the valley southwards. The valley bends to the east to the tiny settlement of Sidi Chamharouch, which has grown around a Muslim shrine. At Sidi Chamharouch, the path leads over the stream and runs steeply uphill to the right side of the Isougouane valley, which leads to two stone-built refuges (Refuge du Toubkal and Refuge Les Mouflons) that are often used as base camp 3,207 m (10,522 ft).

== Routes ==
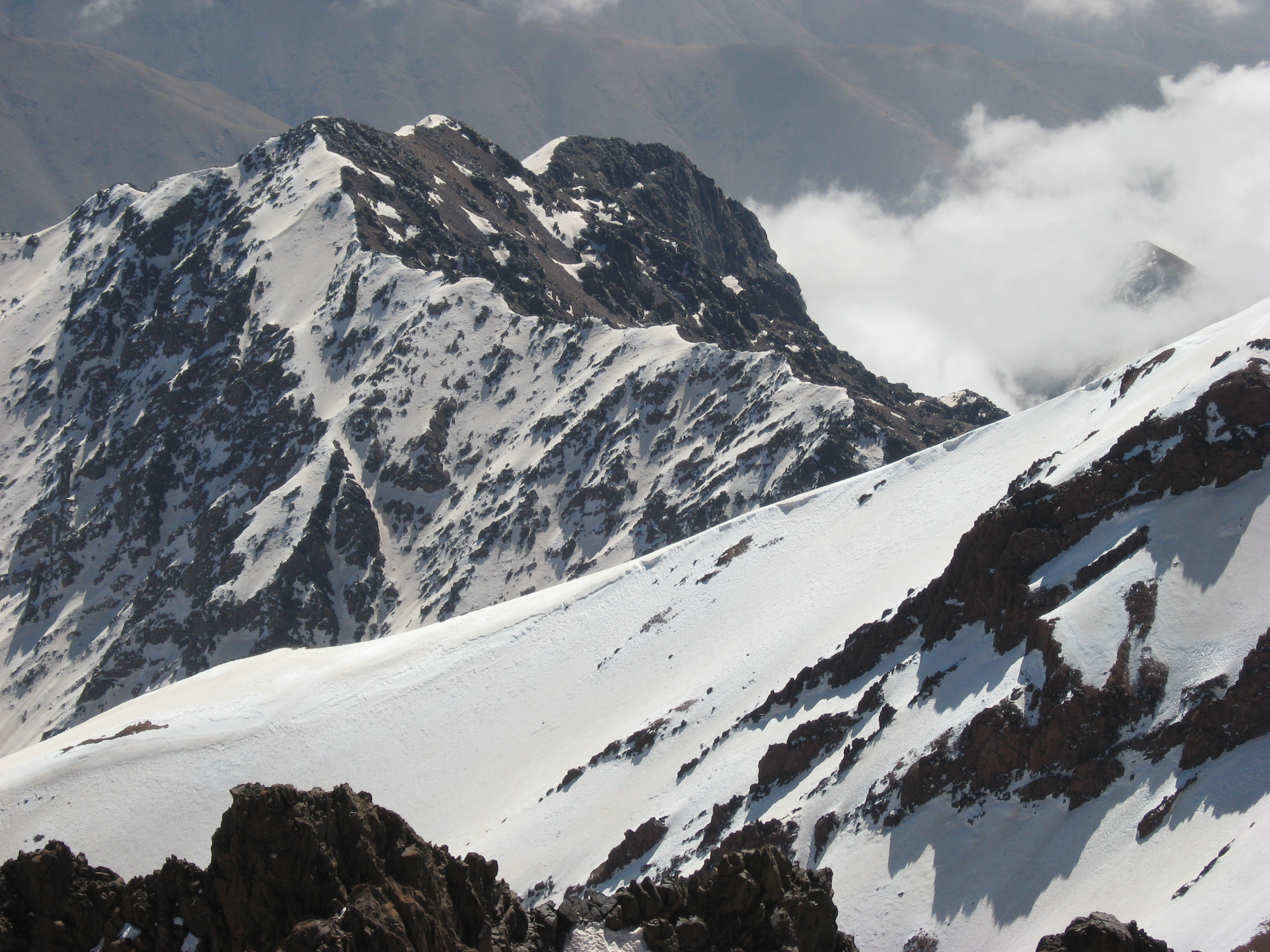
The highest peak of Toubkal

The first recorded ascent was on 12 June 1923 by the Marquis de Segonzac, Vincent Berger and Hubert Dolbeau, but the mountain may well have been climbed before that date. Toubkal's height was measured the following year, and determined as being 4,165 metres (13,665 ft) Nowadays measured at 4,167 metres, the summit is crowned with a large pyramidal metal trigonometric marker, and offers views taking in most of the Atlas and Little Atlas Mountains. It is possible to climb mountain Toubkal in two days - first day up to the refuge (around seven hours), second day to the summit (around four hours ascent, three hours descent) and back to Imlil (up to five hours).

In summer the mountains can be very dry, but are sometimes subject to storms. Although the temperature should remain above zero during the day, freezing conditions are possible over 3,500m. In winter the mountains are covered in snow and ice, and can be prone to avalanches. Skiing is possible as the snow can lie to considerable depth and cover many rocky slopes. Information about the state of the route can be obtained at Marrakesh tourist offices or at Imlil.

1) Ikhibi Sud (normal route). From the Toubkal refuge, a path crosses the stream, climbs a steep scree slope to the east and enters a hanging valley, then climbs another steep slope to reach a col (Tizi'n'Toubkal at 3,940m). At the col the route turns left (northwards) up easy slopes to the narrow summit crest of Jebel Toubkal.

The ascent during the summer (from May) is non-technical yet moderately difficult, complicated only by steep and slippery scree slopes and altitude sickness. Sturdy boots and proper (windproof) clothing are required, and trekking poles are helpful on the scree. An ice-axe may be needed on the remaining snowfields in the early summer. The ascent during the end of the winter and spring (February/March) is more difficult; crampons are necessary to ascend through the snow and - in some cases - ice. Ascent: 960 m (3,150 ft); 2.5 –3 hours.

2) Ikhibi Nord Not as frequently ascended as Ikhibi Sud, but technically easier. The route starts some distance down the valley from the Toubkal refuge, and turns right (eastwards) to follow a track up through a hanging valley to a col on the north side of Toubkal. Ascent:1,000 metres (3,281 ft); 3–4 hours. The col also gives access to adjacent peaks of Imouzzer 4,010 m (13,156 ft) and Tibherine 3,887 m (12,753 ft)

3) West-North-West Ridge (ONO Arete). (First ascent by J de Lepinay and party, 1936). Infrequently climbed, but a long and pleasant traverse containing many gaps and towers. Some difficulties can be avoided by means of an abseil. Grade III/IV; 7 hours.

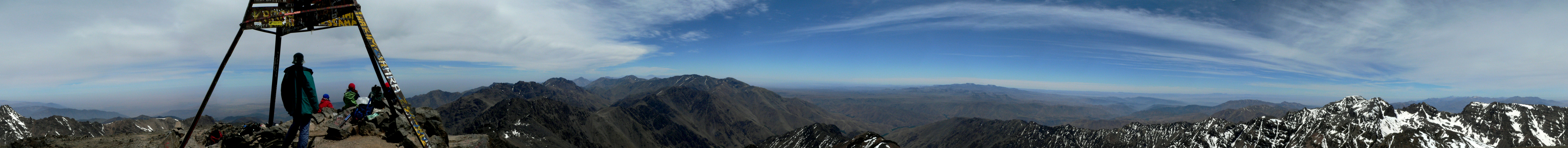
360 degree panorama from the summit

== Other ==
On 17 December 2018, two trekkers, from Denmark and Norway, were murdered close to the foot of the trail in a terror-related attack.
