= Oriental (1997–2015) =

Oriental الجهة الشرقية
- Region
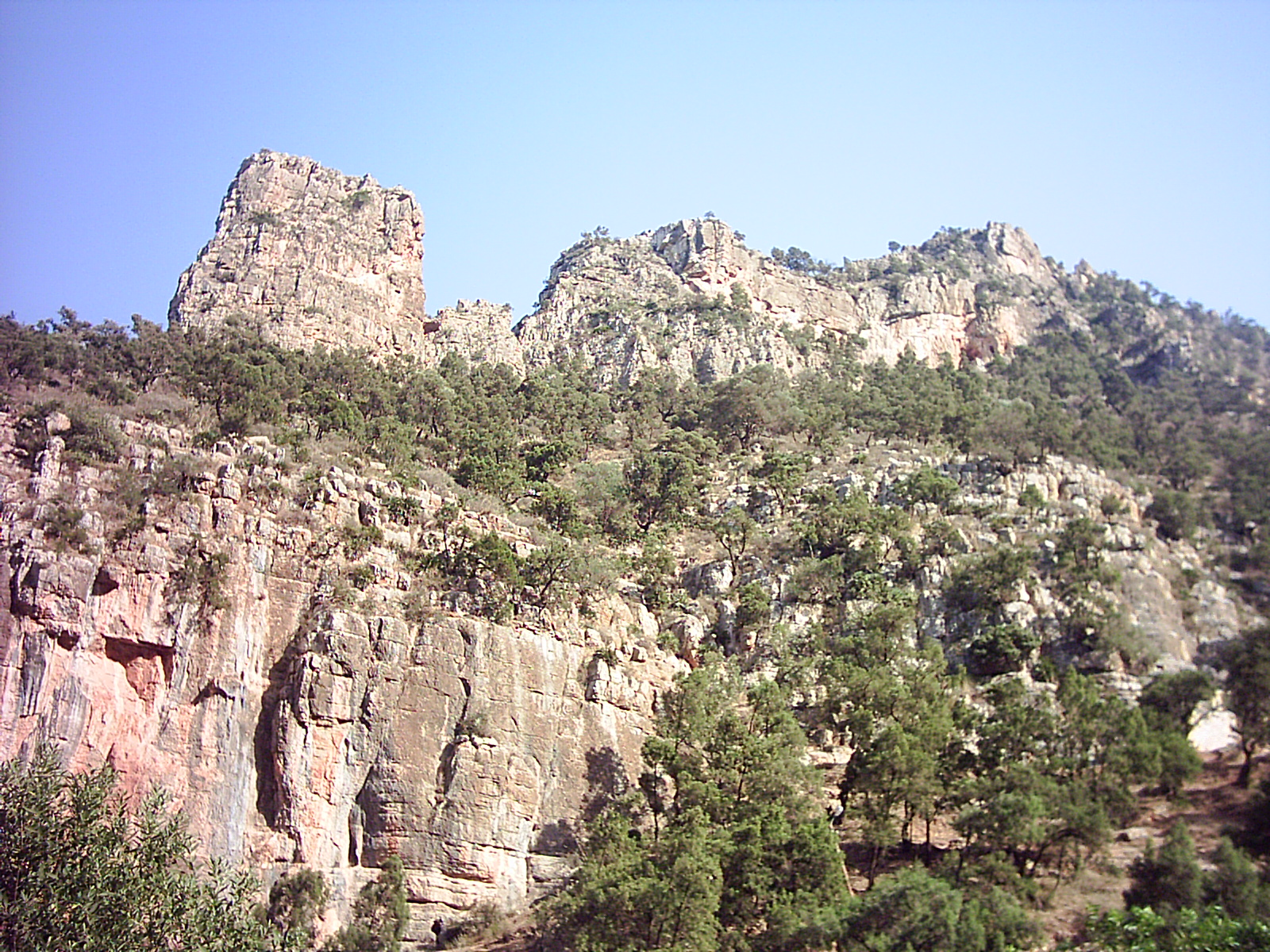
- Jebel Tamejout - Grotte du Chameau (Zegzel)

- Location in Morocco
- Coordinates: 34°41′N 1°54′W
- Country: Morocco
- Capital: Oujda

Government
  - Wali (Governor): Abdelfettah El Houmam

Area
  - Total: 82,900 km^{2} (32,000 sq mi)

Population (2004)
  - Total: 1,918,094
- Time zone: UTC+0 (WET)
  - Summer (DST): UTC+1 (WEST)

Oriental (Arabic: الجهة الشرقية) is one of the sixteen former regions of Morocco. It covers an area of 82,900 km^{2} and has a population of 1,918,094 (2004 census). The capital and largest city is Oujda, and the second largest city is Nador.

== Geography ==
It is situated in the north-east of the country, with a northern coastline on the Mediterranean Sea. The regions of Taza-Al Hoceima-Taounate, Fès-Boulemane and Meknès-Tafilalet lie to its west, with the Algerian provinces of Tlemcen and Naâma to its east and Béchar to the south. Melilla, a Spanish autonomous city, also borders the region.

The region is made up of the following prefectures and provinces:

- Berkane Province
- Eddriwesh Province
- Figuig Province
- Jerada Province
- Nador Province
- Prefecture of Oujda-Angad
- Taourirt Province

== Municipalities by population (2004) ==
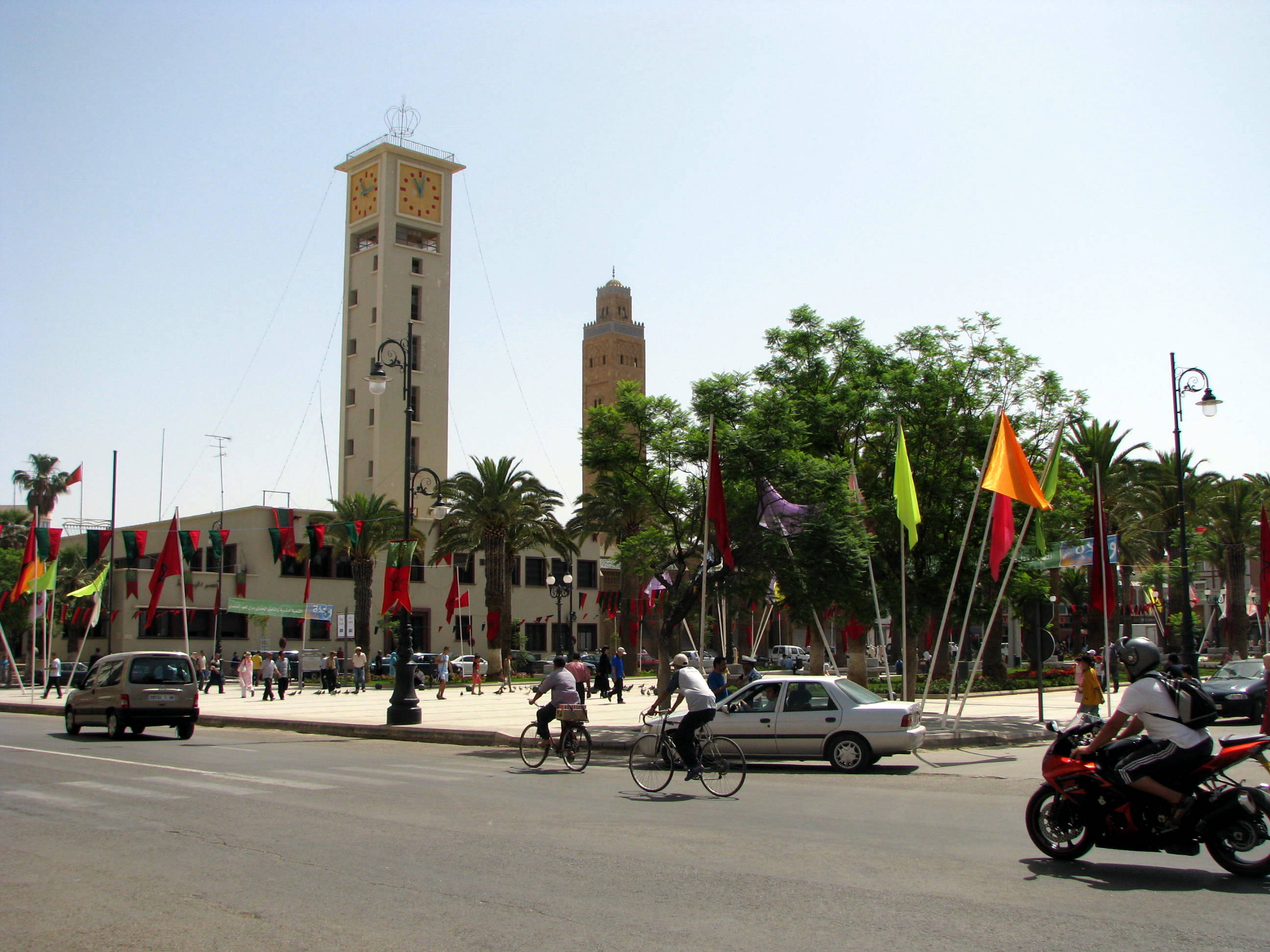
Main square of Oujda, the regional capital and largest city.

- Oujda, Oujda-Angad: 398,131
- Nador, Nador Province: 124,915
- Taourirt, Taourirt Province: 79,664
- Berkane, Berkane Province: 79,570
- Jerada, Jerada Province: 43,870
- Al Aaroui, Nador Province: 36,021
- El Aioun Sidi Mellouk, Taourirt Province: 34,767
- Beni Ensar, Nador Province: 31,800
- Zaio, Nador Province: 29,851
- Bouarfa, Figuig Province: 24,527
- Sidi Slimane Echcharraa, Berkane Province: 22,889
- Zeghanghane, Nador Province: 20,134
- Ahfir, Berkane Province: 19,477
- Ain Bni Mathar, Jerada Province: 13,526
- Figuig, Figuig Province: 12,516
- Aklim, Berkane Province: 8,979
- Bni Drar, Oujda-Angad: 8,919
- Debdou, Taourirt Province: 4,575
- Touissit, Jerada Province: 3,429
- Saidia, Berkane Province: 3,338
- Ain Erreggada, Berkane Province: 2,975
- Naima, Oujda-Angad: 1,151
