= Bouhdila =

- Town
- Location in Morocco Bouhdila (Africa)
- Country: Morocco
- Region: Oriental
- Province: Berkane

Population (2004)
  - Total: 16,145
- Time zone: UTC+0 (GMT)

Bouhdila is a neighbourhood of Berkane, the capital of Berkane Province in Oriental, Morocco. According to the 2004 census, it had a population of 16,145.
