= Mestegmer =

- Rural commune and town
- Interactive map of Mestegmer
- Country: Morocco
- Region: Oriental Region
- Province: Taourirt Province

Population (2004)
  - Total: 6,378
- Time zone: UTC+0 (GMT)

Mestegmer is a small town and rural commune in Taourirt Province of the Oriental region of Morocco. Mestegmer is situated at an elevation of approximately 397 metres (1,302 feet) above sea level. The town lies at coordinates 34°28′60″ N 2°41′58″ W in the province, reflecting the typical topography of the broader area.

At the time of the 2004 census, the commune had a total population of 6,378 people living in 1,094 households.
