= Ahl Oued Za =

Coordinates: 34.373531°N 2.90364°W

- Rural commune and town
- Interactive map of Ahl Oued Za
- Country: Morocco
- Region: Oriental Region
- Province: Taourirt Province

Population (2004)
  - Total: 14,202
- Time zone: UTC+0 (GMT)

Ahl Oued Za is a small town and rural commune in Taourirt Province of the Oriental region of Morocco. At the time of the 2004 census, the commune had a total population of 14202 people living in 2161 households.
