= Chouihia =

- Town
- Location in Morocco
- Coordinates: 34.8720°N 2.6179°W
- Country: Morocco
- Region Rif oriental: Oriental
- Province: Berkane

Population (2004)
  - Total: 12,539
- Time zone: UTC+0 (GMT)

Chouihia is a town in Berkane Province, Rif Oriental, Morocco. According to the 2004 census it has a population of 12,539.
