= Tafoughalt =

Tafoughalt ⵜⴰⴼⵓⵖⴰⵍⵜ
- Town
- Location in Morocco
- Coordinates: 34°48′36″N 2°24′00″W
- Country: Morocco
- Region: Oriental
- Province: Berkane

Population (2014)
  - Total: 2,735
- Time zone: UTC+0 (GMT)

Tafoughalt or Taforalt (Note: Standard Moroccan Tamazight: ⵜⴰⴼⵓⵖⴰⵍⵜ, romanized: tafuɣalt, Arabic: تافوغالت, romanized: tāfūghālt) is a town in Berkane Province, Oriental, Morocco. It is located in the centre of Aït Iznasen mountains. According to a 2014 census it has a population of 2,735.

The parents and older brothers of Hakim Ziyech, a footballer who as of 2023 plays for Chelsea and the Morocco national team, originate from Tafoughalt. They immigrated to the Netherlands in the late 1960s.

nearby to the town is an archeological site known as Grotte des Pigeons (Pigeons cave) containing well preserved paleolithic remains.
