= Oulad M'Hammed =

Coordinates: 33.720428°N 3.02658°W

Oulad M'Hammed أولاد امحمد
- Rural commune and town
- Interactive map of Oulad M'Hammed
- Country: Morocco
- Region: Oriental Region
- Province: Taourirt Province

Population (2004)
  - Total: 2,174
- Time zone: UTC+0 (GMT)

Oulad M'Hammed is a small town and rural commune in Taourirt Province of the Oriental region of Morocco. At the time of the 2004 census, the commune had a total population of 2174 people living in 326 households.
