= Dar Al-Thaqafa =

Cultural center in Berkane, Morocco

- Arabic: دار الثقافة
- Interactive map of the Dar Al-Thaqafa area

General information
- Location: Berkane, Oriental, Morocco
- Coordinates: 34.92°N 2.32°W
- Construction started: 18 August 2016
- Opened: 7 November 2025
- Owner: Government of Morocco
- Operator: Ministry of Youth, Culture and Communication

Dar Al-Thaqafa (Arabic: دار الثقافة, meaning “House of Culture”) is a public cultural center located in Berkane, in the Oriental region of Morocco. It was inaugurated on 7 November 2025 and is operated by the Ministry of Youth, Culture and Communication.

The center hosts cultural activities such as theatre performances, exhibitions, and workshops, contributing to cultural life in the region.
