= Sidi Bouhria =

Sidi Bouhria سيدي بوهرية
- Town
- Location in Morocco
- Coordinates: 34°44′21″N 2°21′44″W
- Country: Morocco
- Region: Oriental
- Province: Berkane

Population (2004)
  - Total: 5,400
- Time zone: UTC+0 (GMT)

Sidi Bouhria is a town in Berkane Province, Oriental, Morocco. According to the 2004 census it has a population of 5400. It’s an area from the Beni-Znassen tribes in the Angad area of Oujda.
