= Ain Lehjer =

Coordinates: 34.59486°N 2.37204°W

Ain Lehjer عين الحجر
- Rural commune and town
- Interactive map of Ain Lehjer
- Country: Morocco
- Region: Oriental Region
- Province: Taourirt Province

Population (2004)
  - Total: 9,210
- Time zone: UTC+0 (GMT)

Ain Lehjer is a small town and rural commune in Taourirt Province of the Oriental region of Morocco. At the time of the 2004 census, the commune had a total population of 9210 people living in 1443 households.
