= El Atef =

Coordinates: 33.70787°N 2.821335°W

El Atef العطف
- Rural commune and town
- Interactive map of El Atef
- Country: Morocco
- Region: Oriental Region
- Province: Taourirt Province

Population (2004)
  - Total: 2,471
- Time zone: UTC+0 (GMT)

El Atef is a small town and rural commune in Taourirt Province of the Oriental region of Morocco. At the time of the 2004 census, the commune had a total population of 2471 people living in 350 households.
