= Mechraa Hammadi =

Coordinates: 34.723282°N 2.79183°W

Mechraa Hammadi مشرع حمادي
- Rural commune and town
- Interactive map of Mechraa Hammadi
- Country: Morocco
- Region: Oriental Region
- Province: Taourirt Province

Population (2004)
  - Total: 7,435
- Time zone: UTC+0 (GMT)

Mechraa Hammadi is a small town and rural commune in Taourirt Province of the Oriental region of Morocco. At the time of the 2004 census, the commune had a total population of 7435 people living in 1150 households.
