= Fezouane =

- Town
- Location in Morocco
- Country: Morocco
- Region: Oriental
- Province: Berkane

Population (2004)
  - Total: 10,304
- Time zone: UTC+0 (GMT)

Fezouane is a town in Berkane Province, Oriental, Morocco. According to the 2004 census it has a population of 10,304.
