= Sidi Ali Belkassem =

Coordinates: 33.985107°N 3.022563°W

Sidi Ali Belkassem سيدي علي بلقاسم
- Rural commune and town
- Interactive map of Sidi Ali Belkassem
- Country: Morocco
- Region: Oriental Region
- Province: Taourirt Province

Population (2004)
  - Total: 13,919
- Time zone: UTC+0 (GMT)

Sidi Ali Belkassem is a small town and rural commune in Taourirt Province of the Oriental region of Morocco. At the time of the 2004 census, the commune had a total population of 13919 people living in 1865 households.
