= List of regions of Morocco by Human Development Index =

This is a list of regions of Morocco by Human Development Index as of 2025 with data for the year 2023.

Rank	Region	HDI (2023)
High human development
1	South (Souss-Massa-Drâa, Guelmim-Es Semara, Laâyoune-Boujdour-Sakia El Hamra, Oued Ed-Dahab-Lagouira)	0.743
2	Centre (Grand Casablanca, Chaouia-Ouardigha, Tadla-Azilal)	0.724
3	Northwest (Rabat-Salé-Zemmour-Zaer, Gharb-Chrarda-Béni Hssen, Tangier-Tetouan)	0.714
–	Morocco (average)	0.710
4	Centre-North (Fès-Boulemane, Taza-Al Hoceima-Taounate)	0.706
6	Eastern (Oriental)	0.705
5	Tensfit (Marrakesh-Tensift-El Haouz, Doukkala-Abda)	0.700
Medium human development
7	Centre-South (Meknès-Tafilalet)	0.688
