= Rislane =

Town in Mororcco

- Town
- Location in Morocco
- Coordinates: 34°46′12″N 2°27′36″W
- Country: Morocco
- Region: Oriental
- Province: Berkane

Population (2004)
  - Total: 5,195
- Time zone: UTC+0 (GMT)

Rislane is a town in Berkane Province, Oriental, Morocco. According to the 2004 census it has a population of 5,195.
