= Sidi Lahsen =

Coordinates: 34.099869°N 2.62188°W

Sidi Lahsen سيدي الحسن
- Rural commune and town
- Interactive map of Sidi Lahsen
- Country: Morocco
- Region: Oriental Region
- Province: Taourirt Province

Population (2004)
  - Total: 9,759
- Time zone: UTC+0 (GMT)

Sidi Lahsen is a small town and rural commune in Taourirt Province of the Oriental region of Morocco. At the time of the 2004 census, the commune had a total population of 9759 people living in 1302 households.
