= Melg El Ouidane =

Coordinates: 34.5667°N 3.0167°W

- Rural commune and town
- Interactive map of Melg El Ouidane
- Country: Morocco
- Region: Oriental Region
- Province: Taourirt Province

Population (2004)
  - Total: 7,699
- Time zone: UTC+0 (GMT)

Melg El Ouidane is a small town and rural commune in Taourirt Province of the Oriental region of Morocco in the Rif. At the time of the 2004 census, the commune had a total population of 7699 people living in 1251 households.
