= Gteter =

Coordinates: 34.27103°N 3.005285°W

- Rural commune and town
- Interactive map of Gteter
- Country: Morocco
- Region: Oriental Region
- Province: Taourirt Province

Population (2004)
  - Total: 6,732
- Time zone: UTC+0 (GMT)

Gteter is a small town and rural commune in Taourirt Province of the Oriental region of Morocco. At the time of the 2004 census, the commune had a total population of 6732 people living in 946 households.
