= Tancherfi =

Coordinates: 34.353851°N 2.62549°W

- Rural commune and town
- Interactive map of Tancherfi
- Country: Morocco
- Region: Oriental Region
- Province: Taourirt Province

Population (2004)
  - Total: 7,452
- Time zone: UTC+0 (GMT)

Tancherfi is a small town and rural commune in Taourirt Province of the Oriental region of Morocco. In the 2004 census the commune had a total population of 7452 people living in 1088 households.
