= Zegzel =

- Town
- Location in Morocco
- Coordinates: 34.8415°N 2.3555°W
- Country: Morocco
- Region: Oriental
- Province: Berkane

Population (2004)
  - Total: 32,210
- Time zone: UTC+0 (GMT)

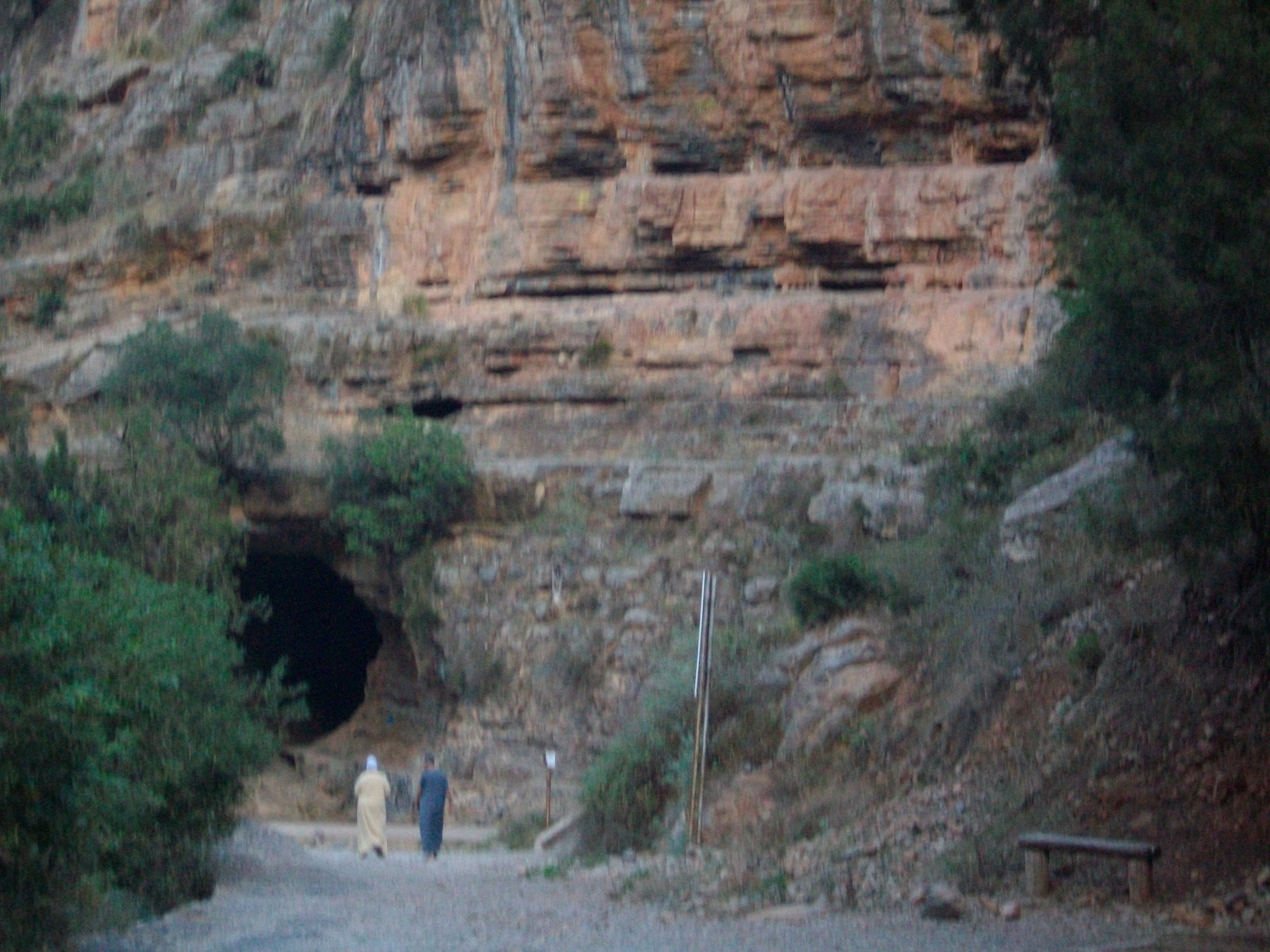

Zegzel is a town in Berkane Province, Oriental, Morocco. It is located in the Aït Iznasen mountains. According to the 2004 census it has a population of 32,210.
