= Basinger =

Basinger is a German surname. Notable people with the surname include:

- Barbara Fugger (1419–1497), born Barbara Basinger, German businessperson and banker
- David Basinger (fl. from 1986), American academic
- Jeanine Basinger (born 1936), American film historian
- Kim Basinger (born 1953), American actress
- Michael Basinger (born 1951), American football player
- Simon Basinger (born 1957), French musicologist and essayist
- William Starr Basinger (1827–1910), American lawyer and scholar
