= Sidi Slimane Echcharraa =

Sidi Slimane Echcharraa سيدي سليمان الشراعة
- Town
- Location in Morocco Sidi Slimane Echcharraa (Africa)
- Coordinates: 34.90888°N 2.354007°W
- Country: Morocco
- Region: Oriental
- Province: Berkane

Population (2004)
  - Total: 22,904
- Time zone: UTC+0 (GMT)

Sidi Slimane Echcharraa (Arabic: سيدي سليمان الشراعة) is a town in Berkane Province, Oriental, Morocco. According to the 2004 census, it has a population of 22,904. It is considered as a suburb of Berkane.
