= Ahfir =

Ahfir ⴰⵃⴼⵉⵔ احفير
- Town
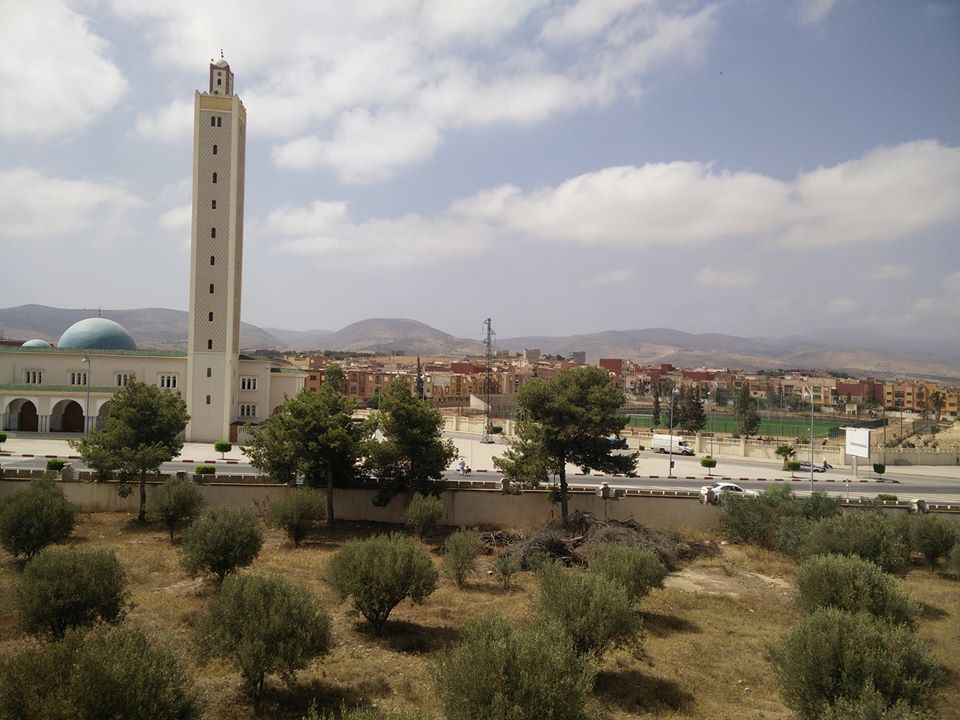
- Interactive map of Ahfir
- Coordinates: 34°57′05″N 2°06′09″W
- Country: Morocco
- Region: Oriental
- Province: Berkane Province

Government
  - Mayor: Mohamed Zerdali

Area
  - Total: 7 km^{2} (2.7 sq mi)
- Elevation: 268 m (879 ft)

Population (2018)
  - Total: 20,811
- Time zone: UTC+0 (GMT)

Ahfir (Arabic: احفير, romanized: Āḥfīr, Standard Moroccan Tamazight: ⴰⵃⴼⵉⵔ) is a town in Berkane Province, Morocco, located in the Oriental region. It is situated on the left bank of the Kiss river, adjacent to the border with Algeria.

The majority of the population belongs to the Beni Snassen (At Iznasen) confederation. Since French colonization in the 19th and 20th centuries, most of the population has shifted to Arabic, with only a minority still speaking Berber. However, following the officialization of Berber in Morocco in 2011, a Berber language teaching program was introduced in schools.

During the French protectorate, the town was named Martimprey-du-Kiss.

== Geography ==
Ahfir is located at the foot of the Beni Snassen mountains. It lies between the Triffa and Angad plains, near the border between Morocco and Algeria. The climate in Ahfir averages around 14 °C in winter and 35 °C in summer, with an altitude ranging between 232 and 262 meters above sea level.

The town is connected to Oujda by a 35 km expressway, to the seaside resort of Saïdia by a 21 km expressway, to Berkane by a national road, and to Nador via the Mediterranean bypass. The nearest airport is Oujda-Angads Airport, located 25 km away, and the nearest port is in Nador, 90 km away via Saïdia.

Ahfir is bordered by Saïdia to the north, Algeria to the east, Beni Drar and Oujda to the south, and Berkane and Ain Reggada to the west.

== History ==
In 1859, the French general Edmond de Martimprey and his army were fighting the local population. To protect themselves, they retreated near the Kiss river and built large defensive trenches in a place called Ahfir. The name means "holes" in Berber. It may also refer to a stone quarry that operated in the area.

On 29 March 1907, French troops entered the region in large numbers. In 1908, general Hubert Lyautey officially founded a village there named Martimprey-du-Kiss, in honor of the general who first fought in the area. The village served as a military post and a crossroads where Moroccan, Algerian, French, and Spanish communities lived together.

When Morocco gained independence in 1956, the village returned to its original name of Ahfir, following a visit to the region by King Mohammed V.

== Administration and demographics ==
In the 2015 municipal elections, Mohamed Zerdali became the president of the urban commune of Ahfir.

The population of Ahfir has grown steadily over the years. It had 19,482 inhabitants in 2004, 19,630 inhabitants in 2014, and reached 20,811 inhabitants in 2018.

== Colonial era data ==
During the colonial era, the population of the town center was about 1,100 people, including around 400 Europeans. There was a small military garrison, and military buildings occupied the site of the former entrenched camp from 1859. The center of Martimprey was under the civil control of the Beni Snassen, with its headquarters in Berkane.

The two tribes around Martimprey, the Beni Khaled, had about 13,000 native people under the authority of the leaders Elyacoubi and Ould Ali.

The town had one of the first modern courts in Morocco, with jurisdiction extending almost 60 kilometers to Niima. Various trades and services were present, including a customs brigadier, a postmaster, a three-class French school, and local businesses such as innkeepers, bakers, cafes, brokers, grocers, and a miller. The climate and soil allowed for varied crops, and the hillsides were suitable for growing vines. There was also a major regional market held on Mondays and Thursdays.

== Education ==
Ahfir is part of the Oriental academy. The main educational institutions in the town include:

- Public primary schools: Al Farabi, Al Atlas, Badr, Ibn Al Haytham, Abi Al Alae Al Maari, Al Wafae, and Al Nour.
- Public middle schools: Kiss and Sidi Abdel Rahman.
- Public high schools: Ennahda.
- Vocational training: Office of Vocational Training and Work Promotion.

== Sources ==
- Franceinfo (13 June 2019). "La langue amazighe (berbère) sera enseignée dans les écoles du Maroc". Franceinfo (in French).
- World Gazetteer (2010). "World Gazetteer: Ahfir".
