= Oujda-Angad Prefecture =

Coordinates: 34.6833°N 1.9167°W

Oujda-Angad Prefecture عمالة وجدة-أنكاد ⵜⴰⵎⵏⴱⴰⴹⵜ ⵏ ⵓⵊⴷⴰ-ⴰⵏⴳⴰⴷ
- Prefecture
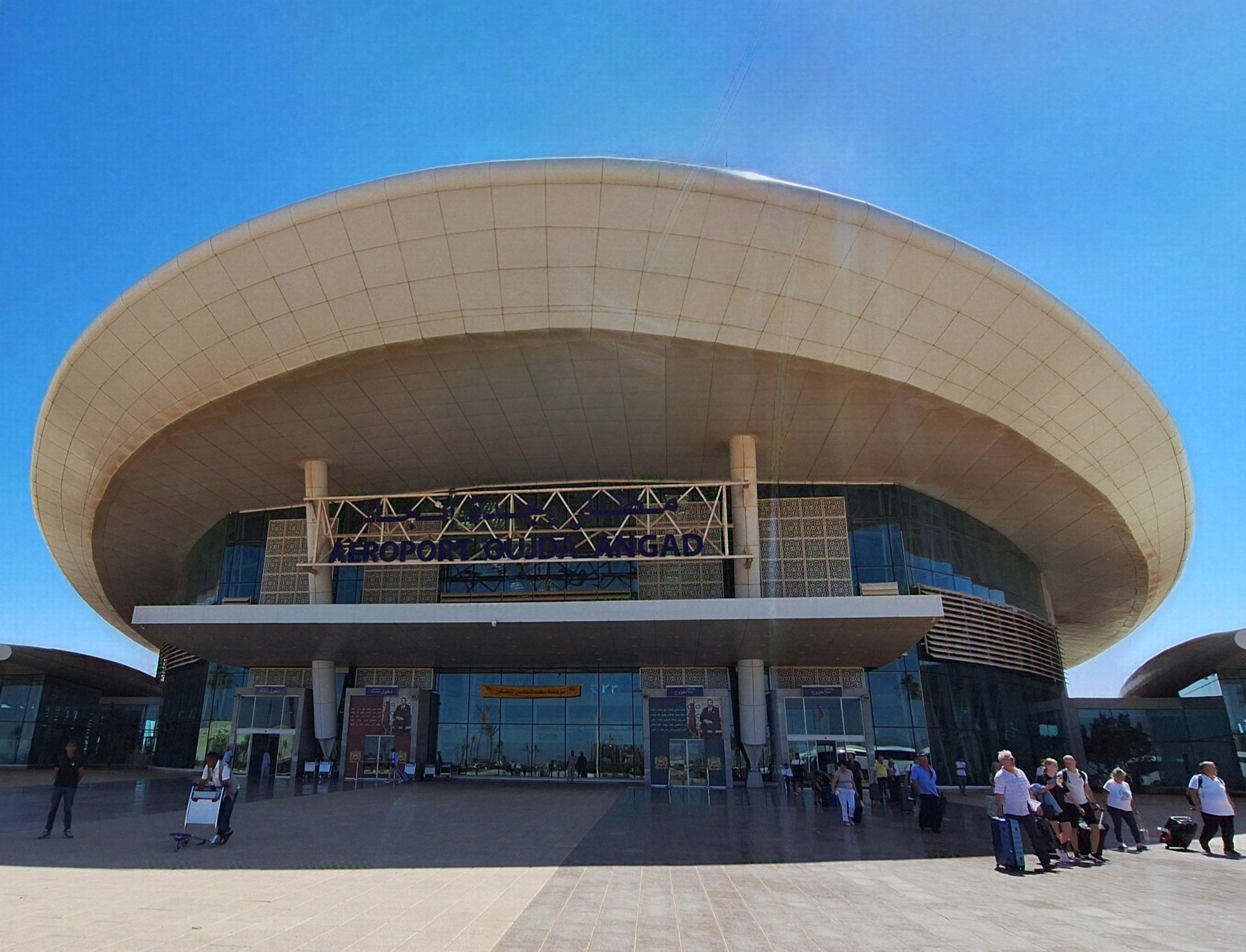
- Oujda-Angad Airport

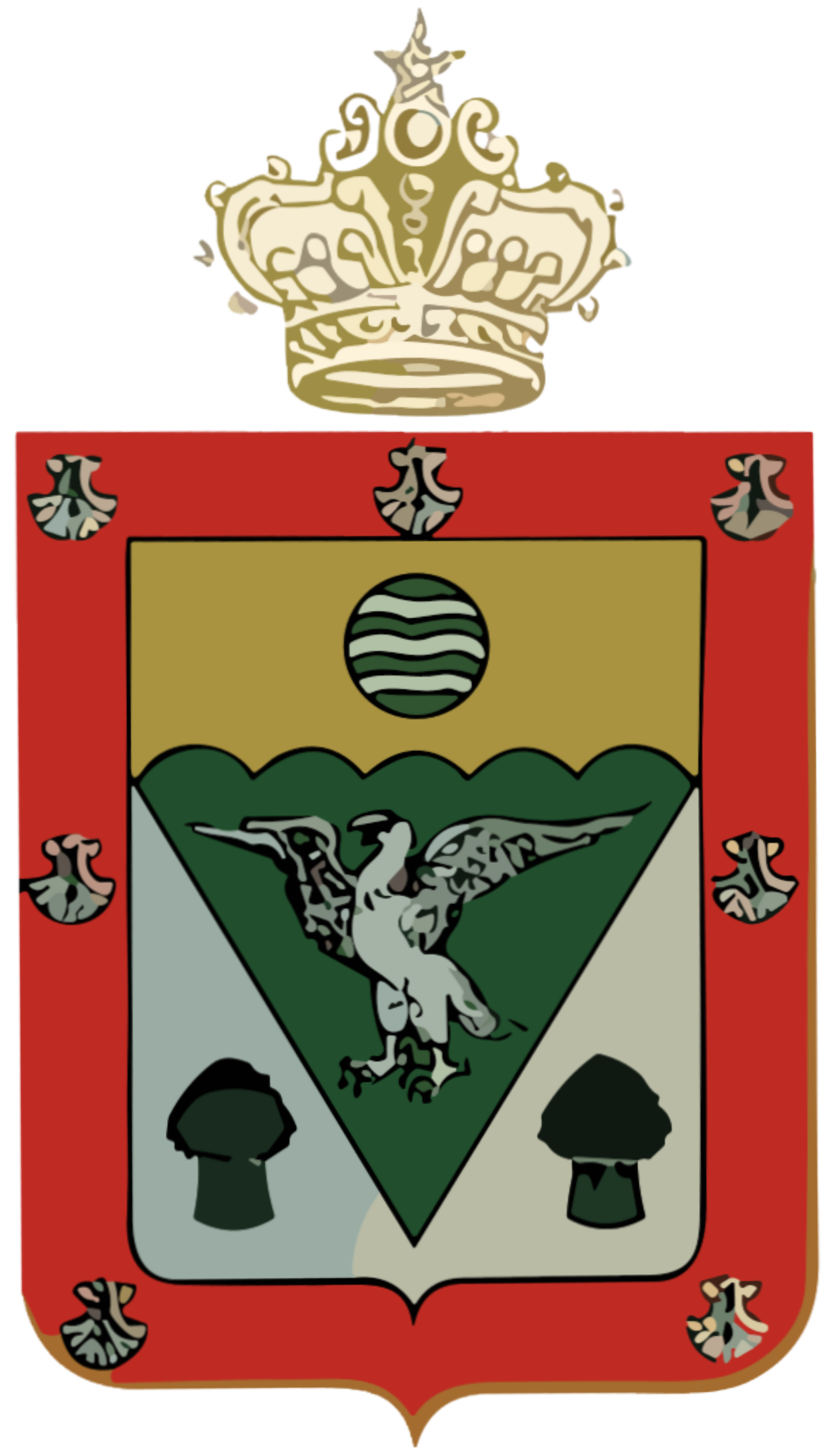
- Seal
- Interactive map of Oujda-Angad Prefecture
- Country: Morocco
- Region: Oriental
- Capital: Oujda

Population (2024)
  - Total: 572,454
- Time zone: UTC+0 (GMT)
- ISO 3166 code: MA-OUJ

Oujda-Angad Prefecture (Arabic: عمالة وجدة-أنكاد, Standard Moroccan Tamazight: ⵜⴰⵎⵏⴱⴰⴹⵜ ⵏ ⵓⵊⴷⴰ-ⴰⵏⴳⴰⴷ) is an urban prefecture in the Oriental region of northeastern Morocco. Its capital is Oujda, which also serves as the regional capital and one of the main urban centers in eastern Morocco.

According to the 2024 census, the prefecture had a population of 572,454.

The northern part of the prefecture is historically associated with the territory of the Béni Iznassen (Aït Iznassen) tribal confederation.

== Geography ==
Oujda-Angad Prefecture is located in the easternmost part of Morocco, along the border with Algeria. It is bordered by Berkane Province to the north and west, and by Jerada Province to the south.

The prefecture extends over the Angad plain, a steppe region characterized by semi-arid conditions, and includes foothills of the eastern Rif. The area has a Mediterranean climate with continental and semi-arid influences, marked by hot summers and relatively cool winters.

== Economy ==
The economy of the prefecture is largely centered on the city of Oujda, which functions as a regional administrative, commercial, and service hub. Trade and cross-border dynamics have historically played an important role due to its proximity to Algeria, although these activities have fluctuated depending on border conditions.

Agriculture is practiced in the surrounding rural communes, mainly consisting of cereal cultivation and livestock breeding in the Angad plain.

== Administrative divisions ==
According to the administrative division, the prefecture is composed of 11 communes, including 3 urban municipalities and 8 rural communes.

=== Municipalities ===
- Bni Drar
- Naïma
- Oujda

=== Rural communes ===
- Ahl Angad
- Ain Sfa
- Bni Khaled
- Bsara
- Isly
- Mestferki
- Sidi Boulenouar
- Sidi Moussa Lemhaya

== See also ==
- Prefectures of Morocco
