= Ain Erreggada =

- Town
- Location in Morocco Ain Erreggada (Africa)
- Coordinates: 34.9289°N 2.23806°W
- Country: Morocco
- Region: Oriental
- Province: Berkane

Population (2004)
  - Total: 2,983
- Time zone: UTC+0 (GMT)

Ain Erreggada is a town in Berkane Province, Oriental, Morocco. At the time of the 2004 census it had a population of 2,983.
