= Berkane Province =

Coordinates: 34.917614°N 2.317469°W

Berkane Province إقليم بركان ⵜⴰⵙⴳⴰ ⵏ ⴱⵔⴽⴰⵏ
- Province
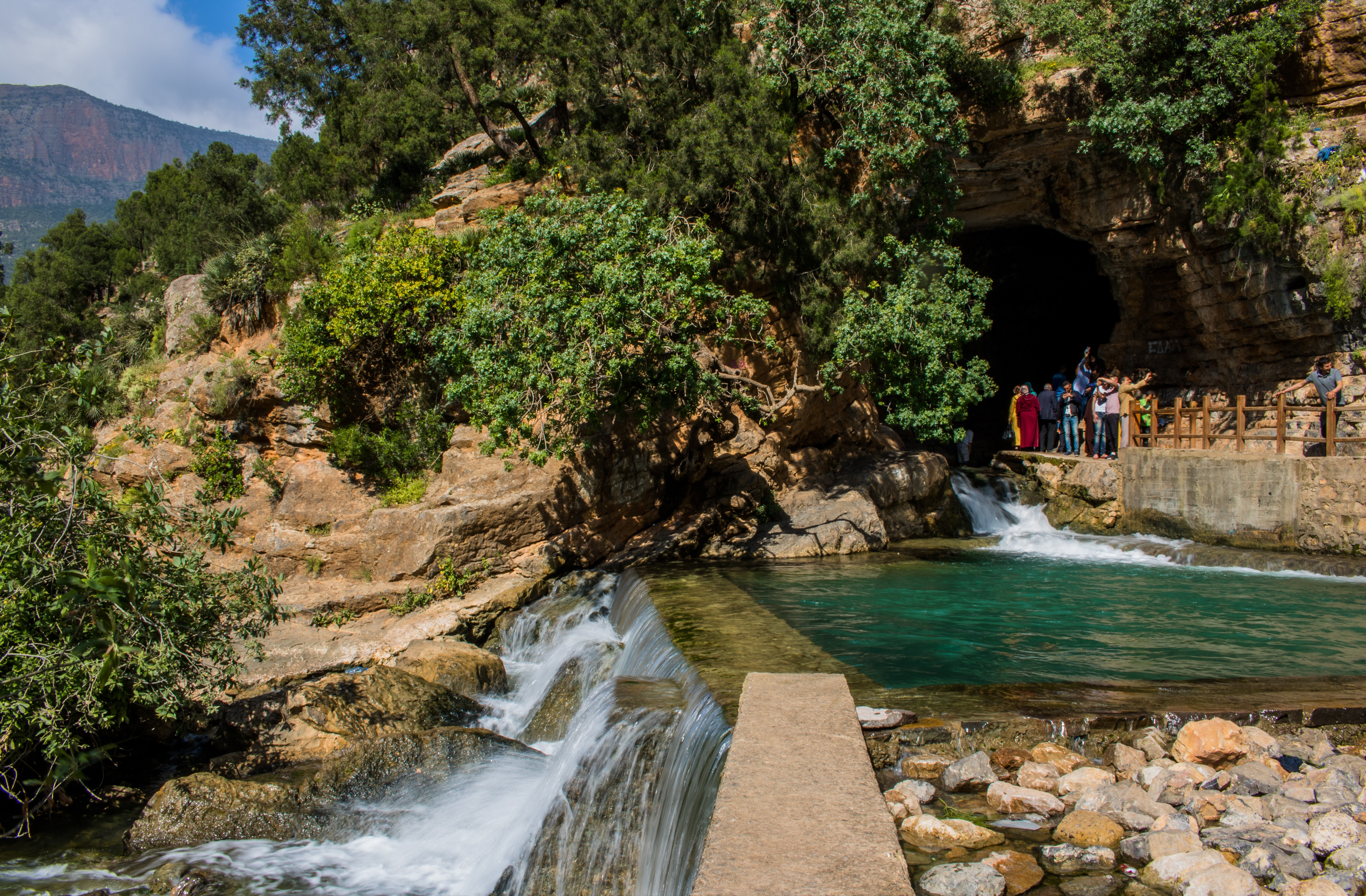
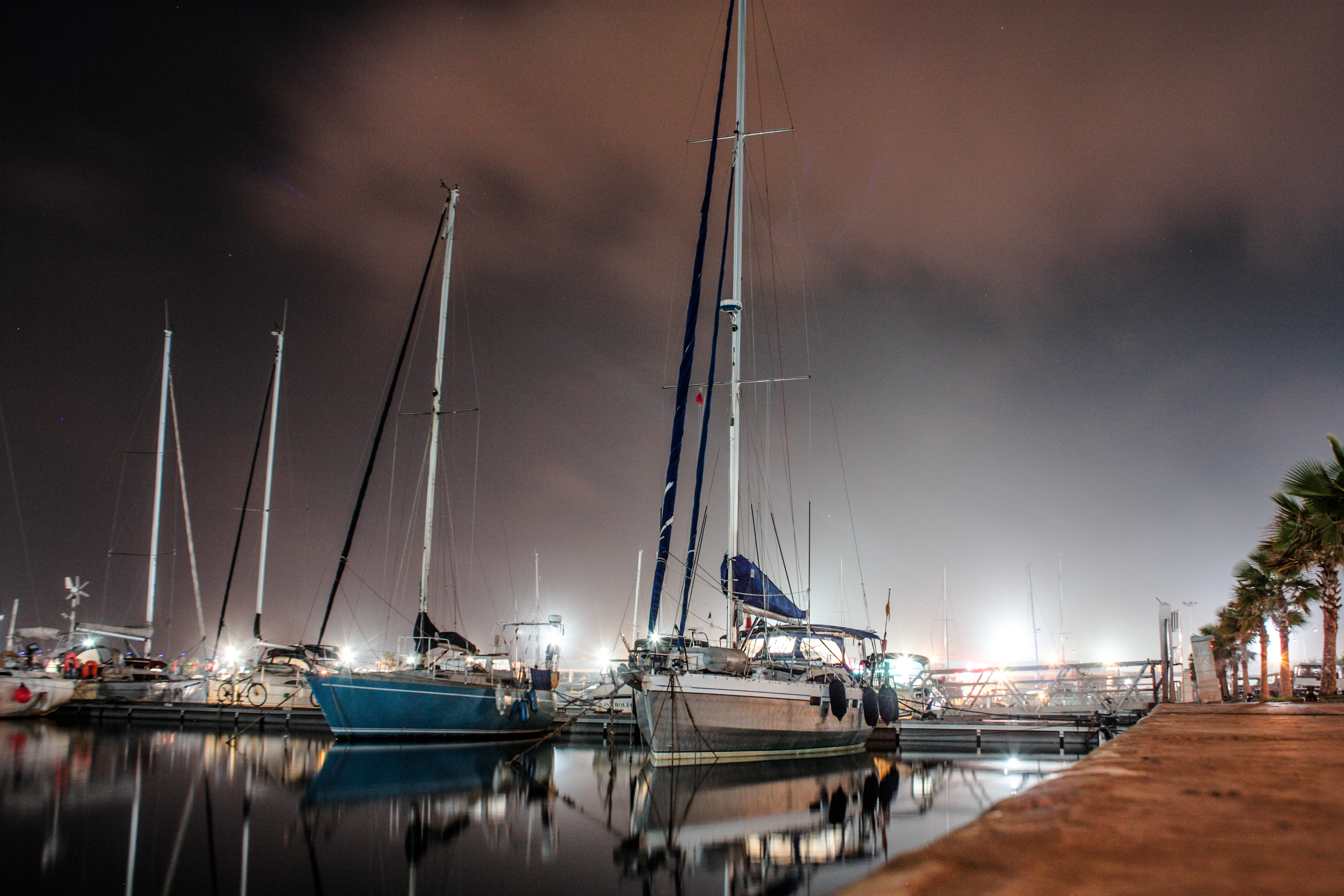
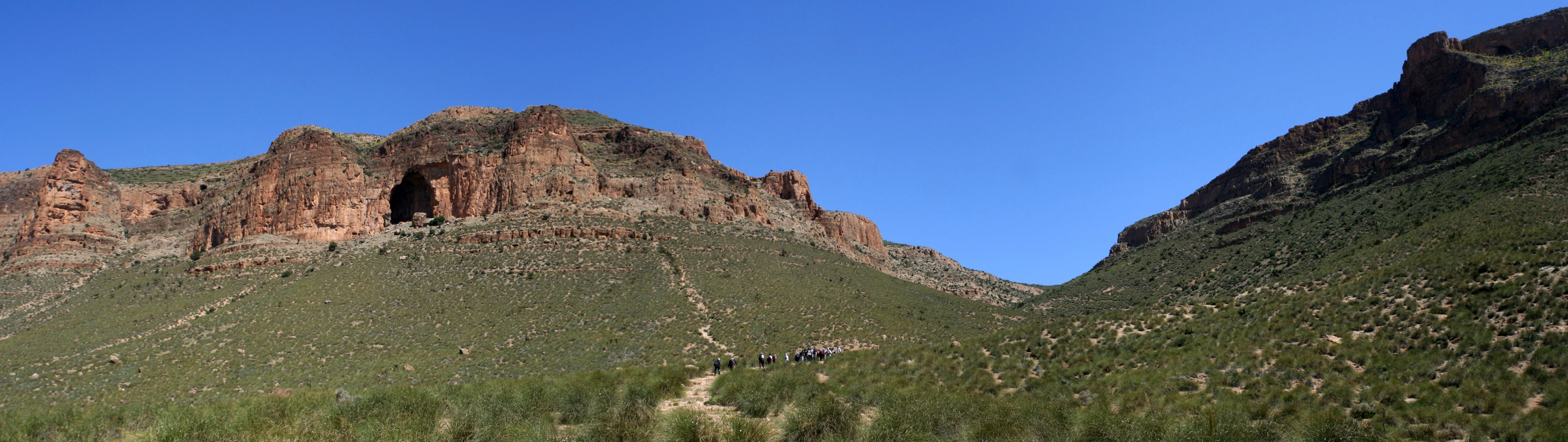

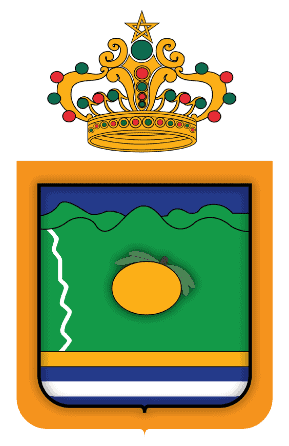
- Coat of arms
- Interactive map of Berkane Province
- Country: Morocco
- Region: Oriental
- Capital: Berkane

Population (2016)
  - Total: 289,137

Berkane Province (Arabic: بَركان, Standard Moroccan Tamazight: ⴱⵔⴽⴰⵏ) is located in northeastern Morocco in the Oriental region. The province was officially formed on 24 January 1994. It is bounded by the Mediterranean to its north, the Kiss Oued (Moroccan-Algerian border) and Oujda Prefecture in the east, Nador Province to the west, and Taourirt Province in the south. The Province includes under its jurisdiction the towns of Saïdia and Ahfir.

The population originates primarily from Beni Iznasen, a major tribe in the region. The tribe's descendants are spread widely over the rest of the Oriental region. Eastern Morocco Arabic and Taznasit are the primary spoken languages.

Berkane province is considered a major player in the citrus fruit industry and high-quality fresh fruit and vegetables are plentiful year round. Saïdia is a popular beach resort town on the Mediterranean, Tafoughalt is a small village in the nearby mountains known for its healthy air and herb markets.

Berkane is the main city and namesake of the province, The city sprawls into the hillsides and connects via bridge to a small neighboring town/suburb named Sidi Slimane Echcharraa.

The major cities and towns are:

- Ahfir
- Berkane
- Saïdia

== Etymology ==
The province is named after its capital and largest city, Berkane. The name of the city comes from the word "aberkan" which means "black" in the Berber language.

== Subdivisions ==
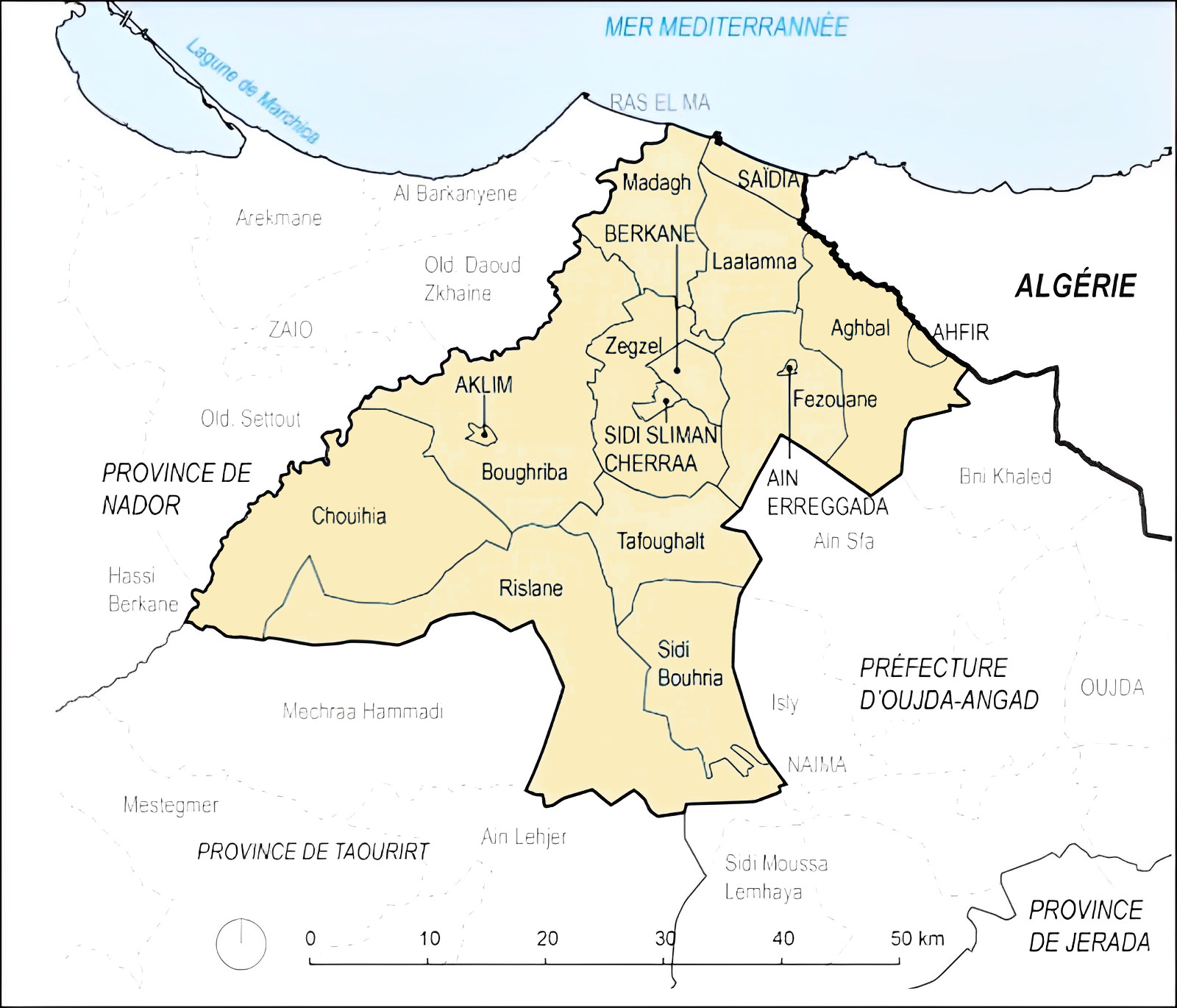
Communes of Berkane Province

The province is divided administratively into the following:

| Name | Geographic code | Type | Households | Population (2004) | Foreign population | Moroccan population | Notes |
|---|---|---|---|---|---|---|---|
| Ahfir | 113.01.01. | Municipality | 4,160 | 19,482 | 310 | 19,172 | |
| Ain Erreggada | 113.01.05. | Municipality | 625 | 2,983 | 11 | 2,972 | |
| Aklim | 113.01.07. | Municipality | 1,812 | 8,969 | 5 | 8,964 | |
| Berkane | 113.01.09. | Municipality | 17,245 | 80,012 | 199 | 79,813 | |
| Saïdia | 113.01.25. | Municipality | 829 | 3,338 | 77 | 3,261 | |
| Sidi Slimane Echcharraa | 113.01.29. | Municipality | 4,561 | 22,904 | 14 | 22,890 | |
| Aghbal | 113.03.01. | Rural commune | 2,704 | 13,809 | 124 | 13,685 | |
| Fezouane | 113.03.07. | Rural commune | 2,005 | 10,304 | 21 | 10,283 | |
| Laatamna | 113.03.09. | Rural commune | 3,182 | 15,493 | 177 | 15,316 | |
| Madagh | 113.03.11. | Rural commune | 2,758 | 13,980 | 54 | 13,926 | 2,312 residents live in the center, called Madagh; 11,668 residents live in rural areas. |
| Boughriba | 113.05.03. | Rural commune | 3,727 | 20,560 | 4 | 20,556 | |
| Chouihia | 113.05.05. | Rural commune | 2,138 | 12,539 | 0 | 12,539 | |
| Rislane | 113.05.13. | Rural commune | 879 | 5,195 | 0 | 5,195 | |
| Sidi Bouhria | 113.05.15. | Rural commune | 991 | 5,400 | 1 | 5,399 | |
| Tafoughalt | 113.05.17. | Rural commune | 609 | 3,150 | 2 | 3,148 | |
| Zegzel | 113.05.19. | Rural commune | 6,424 | 32,210 | 38 | 32,172 | 16,145 residents live in the center, called Bouhdila; 16,065 residents live in rural areas. |
