= Jamal Al-Qadiri Al-Boutchichi =

Moroccan murshid (1942–2025)

- جمال القادري البودشيشي
- Born: 1942; Madagh, Morocco
- Died: 8 August 2025 (aged 82–83)
- Occupation: Murshid

Jamal Al-Qadiri Al-Boutchichi (Arabic: جمال الدين القادري البودشيشي; 1942 – 8 August 2025) was a Moroccan murshid of the Sufi tariqa Budshishiyya.

Al-Qadiri Al-Boutchichi lived in the northeastern Moroccan town of Madagh and was the son of Hamza Al-Qadiri Al-Boutchichi. Before his father died, he recognised Jamal as the successor to lead the Budshishiyya tariqa. His father died on 18 January 2017.

Al-Qadiri Al-Boutchichi died on 8 August 2025.
