= Aklim =

- Town
- Location in Morocco Aklim (Africa)
- Coordinates: 34°55′N 2°26′W
- Country: Morocco
- Region: Oriental
- Province: Berkane

Population (2004)
  - Total: 8,969
- Time zone: UTC+0 (GMT)

Aklim is a town in Berkane Province, Oriental, Morocco. According to the 2004 census, it has a population of 8,969.

Nearby is one of the sites considered for the European Extremely Large Telescope (ELT).

== Notable people ==
- Mohammed Chaouch - Former international footballer
