= Madagh, Morocco =

Madagh مداغ ⵎⴰⴷⴰⵖ
- Town
- Location in Morocco Madagh (Africa)
- Coordinates: 35°00′48″N 2°20′23″W
- Country: Morocco
- Region: Oriental
- Province: Berkane

Population (2014)
  - Total: 3,252
- Time zone: UTC+0 (GMT)

Madagh (Arabic: مداغ; Standard Moroccan Tamazight: ⵎⴰⴷⴰⵖ) is a town in Berkane Province, Oriental, Morocco. According to the 2004 census it has a population of 2312.
