= Boughriba =

Boughriba بوغريبة
- Town
- Location in Morocco
- Coordinates: 34.9352°N 2.4306°W
- Country: Morocco
- Region: Oriental
- Province: Berkane

Population (2004)
  - Total: 20,560
- Time zone: UTC+0 (GMT)

Boughriba is a town in Berkane Province, Oriental, Morocco. According to the 2004 census it has a population of 20,560.
