= Bni Drar =

Bni Drar Ait Idrār
- Municipality
- Interactive map of Bni Drar
- Coordinates: 34°51′28″N 1°59′34″W
- Country: Morocco
- Region: Oriental
- Prefecture: Oujda-Angad
- Elevation: 475 m (1,558 ft)

Population (2004)
  - Total: 8,919
- Time zone: UTC+0 (GMT)

Bni Drar or Ait Idrār is a municipality in the Oujda-Angad prefecture in Beni Snassen region in the Oriental Region of Morocco. In the country's 2004 census, Bni Drar's population was recorded as 8,919, making it the second largest settlement in the prefecture after the city of Oujda. In 1994 its population was 6663 and it is estimated in 2012 that its population is 11,083.

It lies on the N2 highway 20 km to the northwest of the regional capital, Oujda, and 17 km southeast of Ahfir. It is near the closed border with Algeria.

The town has a school and a lycée, a market, a hospital, a woman's club and a cemetery.
