= Mohammed Allal Sinaceur =

Philosopher, politician and writer

- محمد علال سينشر

Minister of Cultural Affairs
- In office August 11, 1992 – January 31, 1995
- Monarch: Hassan II
- Prime Minister: Mohammed Karim Lamrani; Abdellatif Filali
- Preceded by: Mohamed Benaissa
- Succeeded by: Abdellah Azmani

Personal details
- Born: 1941 (age 84–85) Oujda, Morocco
- Occupation: Politician, Writer, Philosopher

Mohammed Allal Sinaceur (born 1941) is a Moroccan philosopher, politician and writer. He was the Moroccan Minister of Cultural Affairs.

== Biography ==
Sinaceur was born in Oujda, Morocco in 1941. He is a member of a well connected Moroccan family. His brother Mohamed Habib Sinaceur, a politician, died in 2000. One of his brothers is a General and another, Jamal Eddine Sinaceur, is a diplomat. He was the Moroccan Minister for Cultural Affairs in 1994.

He writes on philosophy and Islamic issues for UNESCO and some of his works have been translated into over 30 languages. He is called to expert meetings on Education.

== Works ==
He has been writing since at least 1977.

His works include

- Aristote aujourd'hui : études réunies ... à l'occasion du 2300e anniversaire de la mort du philosophe, 1988 in French
- Cours de philosophie positive, with Auguste Comte, Ed, 1998 in French
- The Hassan II mosque, with Philippe Ploqui
