= Saïdia =

Saïdia: السعيدية (Arabic); ⴰⵊⵔⵓⴷ (Standard Moroccan Tamazight)
- Town
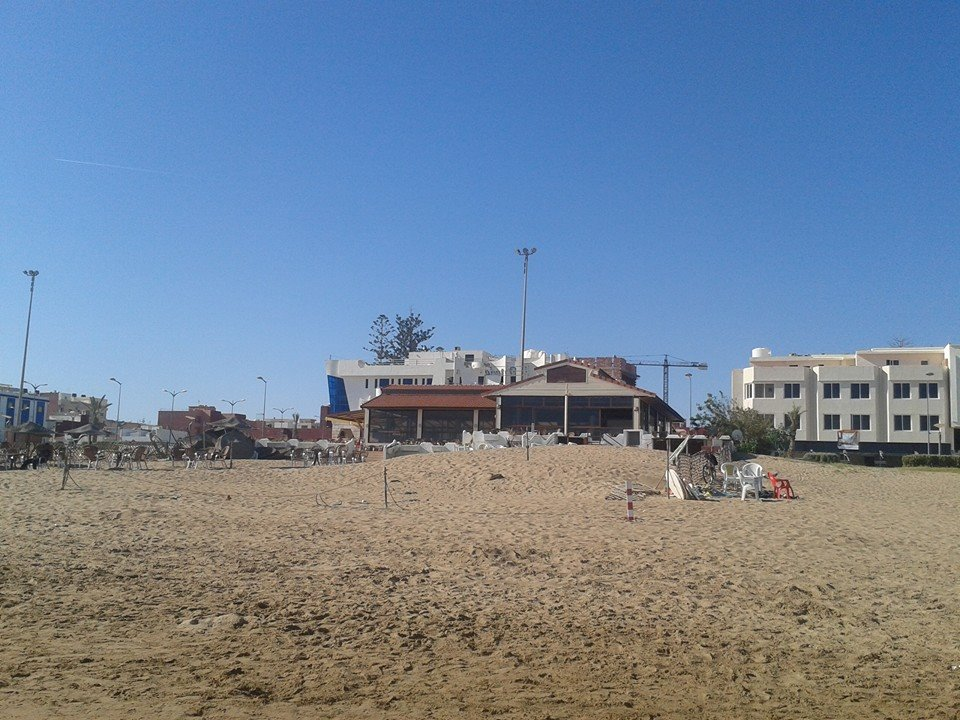
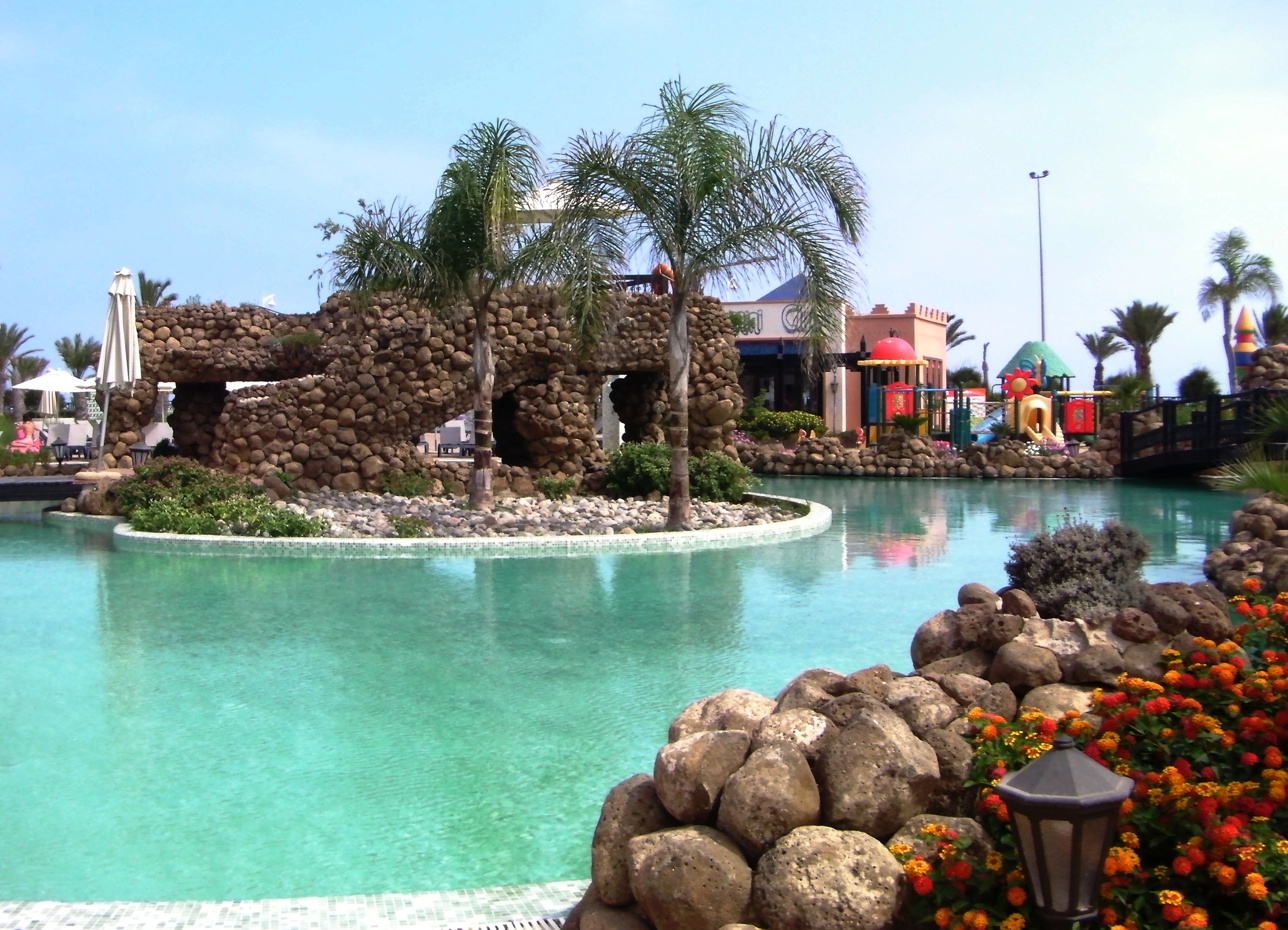
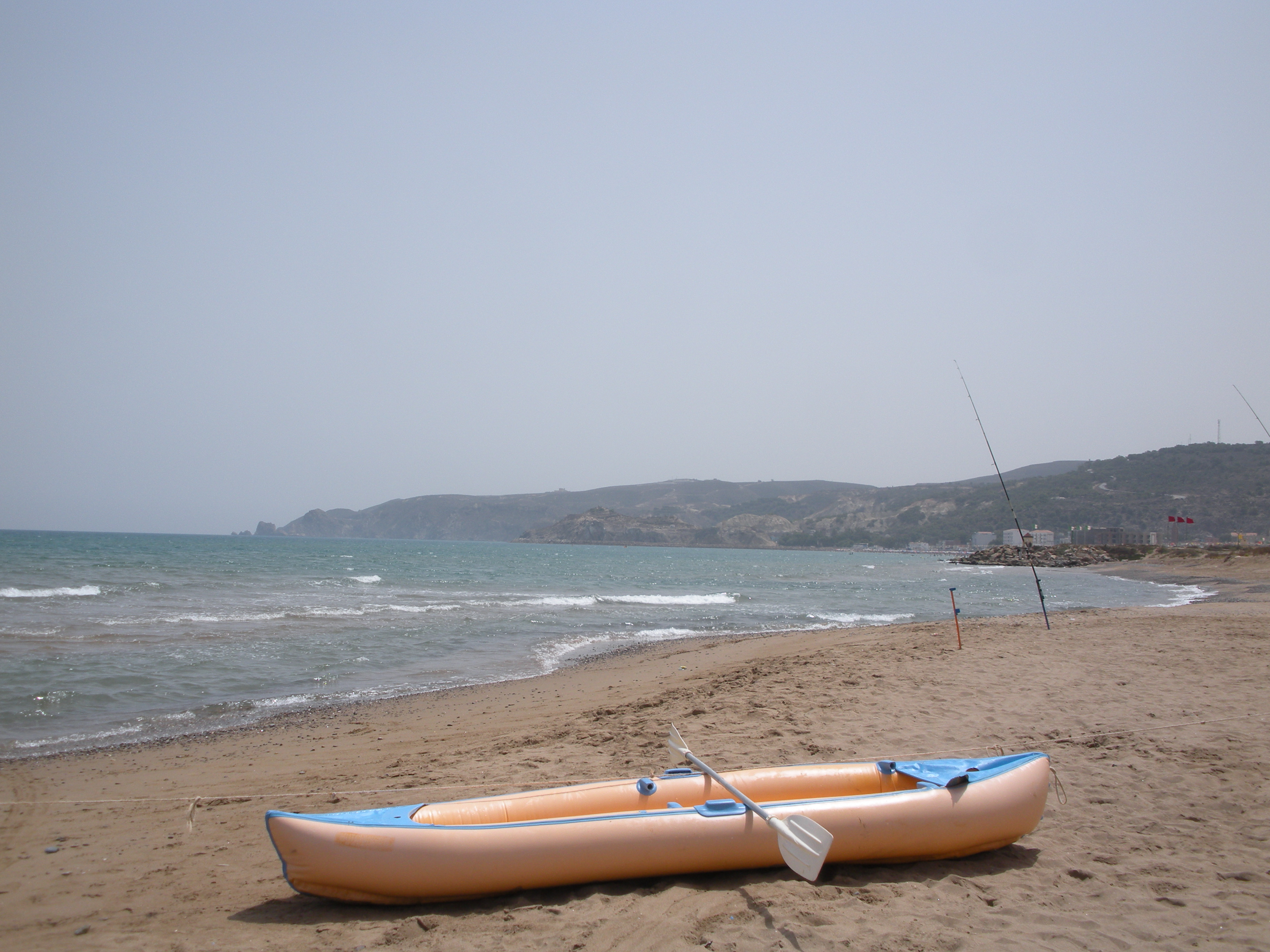
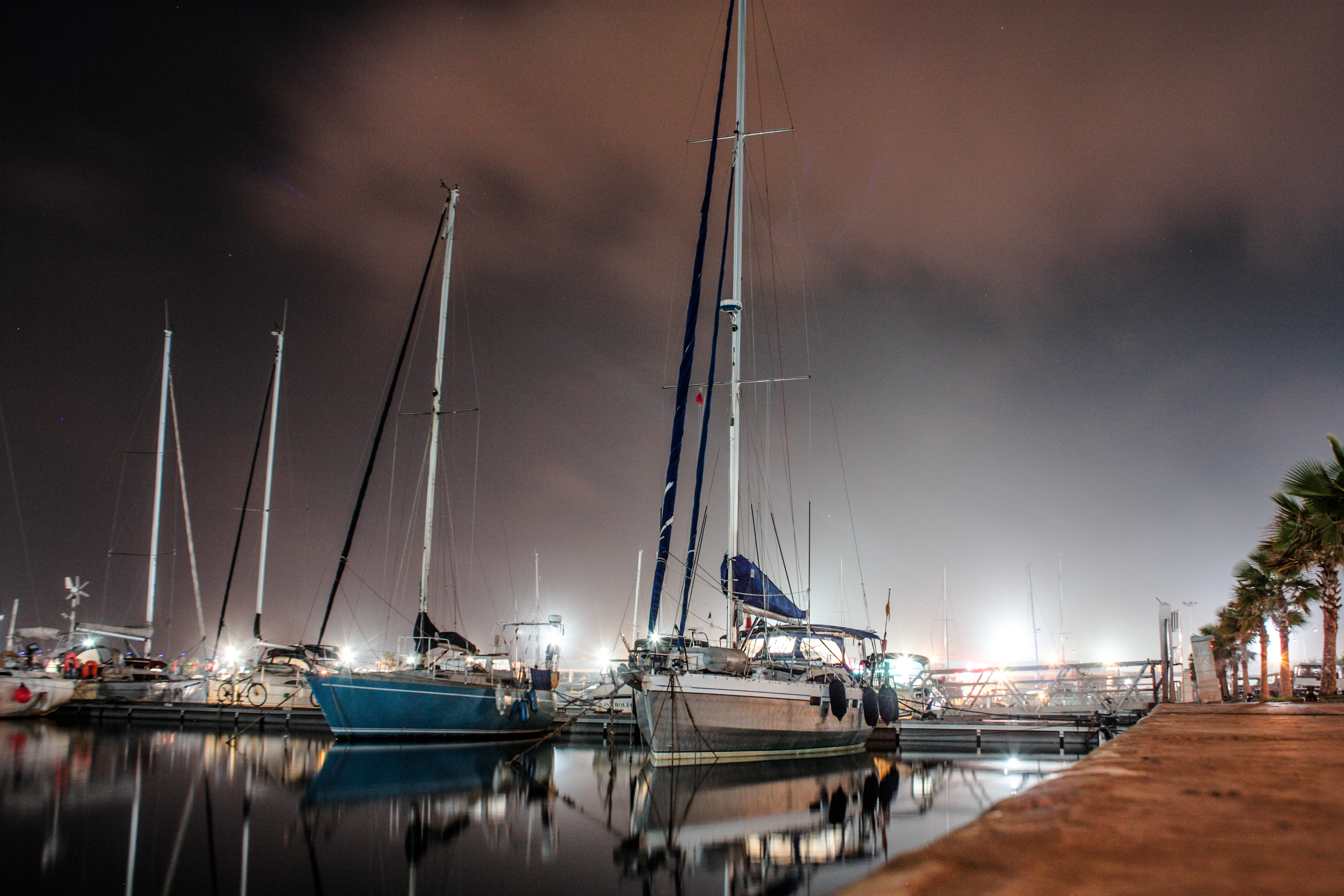
- Interactive map of Saïdia
- Coordinates: 35°05′06″N 02°14′21″W
- Country: Morocco
- Region: Oriental
- Province: Berkane

Population (2024)
  - Total: 10,514
- Time zone: UTC+0 (GMT)

Saïdia (Arabic: السعيدية, romanized: as-Saʿīdiyya; Berber: ⴰⵊⵔⵓⴷ, romanized: Ajrud) is a coastal town in northeastern Morocco. It is located in the Berkane Province in the north of Beni Znassen region, lying in the adjacent mediterranean coast north of Berkane, along the Mediterranean Sea to the north and Moroccan-Algerian border to the east. Its 14 km (8.7 mi) coastline is one of the longest beaches of Morocco and is characterized by its golden sand and Mediterranean climate, making it a popular international tourist destination. It hosts numerous resorts and attractions, including private beach resorts, shopping malls, golf courses, and other sports centers.

Saïdia's marina covers an area of 290,000 square meters (72 acres), with 740 berths and modern marina facilities. Tourists are attracted by its traditional folk music festival every August. It is surrounded by a natural bird preserve of marsh and woodland called Moulouya National Parc. Access to the main beach is through a eucalyptus forest.

== Climate ==
Saïdia climate is semi-arid (Köppen climate classification: BSh). It is mild all year round, highly influenced by maritime winds. In summer, the average maximum and minimum temperatures are 27–30 °C (81–86 °F) and 19–22 °C (66–72 °F), respectively, and, in winter, 17–20 °C (63–68 °F) and 9–12 °C (48–54 °F). Autumn and winter are the wettest seasons, having more than 80% of total annual rainfall.

Saïdia has a semi-arid climate (Köppen climate classification: BSk). Winters are mild and summers are hot and dry. Its coastal location on the Mediterranean Sea influences its climate significantly, moderating temperatures throughout the year. According to Climate-Data.org, Saïdia has a mean annual temperature of 17.7 °C (63.9 °F) and gets about 371 mm (14.6 in) of precipitation per year.

August is the warmest month, with an average temperature of 26.1 °C (79.0 °F) with an average minimum temperature of 21.0 °C (69.8 °F) and an average maximum temperature of 31.7 °C (89.1 °F). The coolest month is January with an average temperature of 10.4 °C | 50.7 °F. Average high temperature is 16.2 °C (61.2 °F) in January and 31.7 °C (89.1 °F) in August, while average low temperature is 5.6 °C (42.1 °F) in January and 21.0 °C (69.8 °F) n August.

Rainfall is highly seasonal. The wettest month is March with an average of 53 mm (2.1 in) of precipitation, and the second wettest is November with 48 mm (1.9 in). The driest month is July with an average precipitation of only about 2 mm (0.079 in), and August gets about 5 mm (0.20 in). The summer dry season is especially pronounced from June to August with mean monthly rainfall ranging from 2 to 9 mm (0.079 to 0.354 in).

Average relative humidity is about 68% over the year. It peaks at around 73% in December and bottoms out at around 58% in July. The number of days with at least 1 mm of precipitation is also strongly seasonal, with very few of these days during July and August and considerably more during autumn, winter and spring.

The relatively mild winters, hot summers and pronounced dry season in summer give Saïdia a typical semi-arid climate of the Mediterranean coastal region of north-eastern Morocco. The Mediterranean Sea, nearby, moderates the annual temperature range compared to inland areas of eastern Morocco.

Climate data for Saidia
Month	Jan	Feb	Mar	Apr	May	Jun	Jul	Aug	Sep	Oct	Nov	Dec	Year
Mean daily maximum °C (°F)	16.2 (61.2)	16.8 (62.2)	19.1 (66.4)	21.1 (70.0)	24.1 (75.4)	28.1 (82.6)	31.3 (88.3)	31.7 (89.1)	28.3 (82.9)	25.3 (77.5)	19.7 (67.5)	17.1 (62.8)	23.3 (73.9)
Daily mean °C (°F)	10.4 (50.7)	11.1 (52.0)	13.4 (56.1)	15.6 (60.1)	18.7 (65.7)	22.7 (72.9)	25.7 (78.3)	26.1 (79.0)	23.0 (73.4)	19.7 (67.5)	14.4 (57.9)	11.4 (52.5)	17.7 (63.9)
Mean daily minimum °C (°F)	5.6 (42.1)	6.2 (43.2)	8.2 (46.8)	10.3 (50.5)	13.6 (56.5)	17.3 (63.1)	20.3 (68.5)	21.0 (69.8)	18.6 (65.5)	15.0 (59.0)	9.9 (49.8)	6.9 (44.4)	12.7 (54.9)
Average precipitation mm (inches)	42 (1.7)	42 (1.7)	53 (2.1)	42 (1.7)	33 (1.3)	9 (0.4)	2 (0.1)	5 (0.2)	23 (0.9)	39 (1.5)	48 (1.9)	33 (1.3)	371 (14.6)
Average precipitation days (≥ 1.0 mm)	5	5	5	5	3	1	0	1	3	4	5	4	41
Average relative humidity (%)	72	72	71	69	65	61	58	62	68	72	71	73	68
Source: Climate-Data.org

== History ==
The nucleus of Saïdia dates from 1883 and was the work of Sultan Hassan I, who built a 15,600-square-meter (3¾ acre) casbah (fortress) on the left bank of the mouth of the river Kiss. Its purpose was to monitor and regulate the movement of people to and from Algeria, which was then under French sovereignty. After Morocco became a French protectorate in 1913, Saïdia proved popular with French settlers and became a resort. After Moroccan independence, Saïdia continued to attract visitors and has become one of the country's most popular tourist attractions.
