= El Aioun Sidi Mellouk =

El Aioun Sidi Mellouk EL AIOUN CHARKIYA
- Town
- Interactive map of El Aioun Sidi Mellouk
- Coordinates: 34°35′N 2°30′W
- Region: Oriental
- Province: Taourirt Province

Population (2004)
  - Total: 34,767
- Time zone: UTC+0 (GMT)
- Postal code: 65450
- Website: WWW.ELAIOUN24.COM

El Aioun Sidi Mellouk or El Aioun is a city in Taourirt Province, Oriental, Morocco. It is located along National Route 6, 50.2 kilometres (31.2 mi) northeast of Taourirt and 58.6 kilometres (36.4 mi) southwest of Oujda. According to the 2004 census, it has a population of 34,767. It contains several schools including Lycee Ezzayotune, Ecole Mohamed Belkhayyat and Ecole Route de Jirada in the southeast of the town. College Sidi Makhoukh is located to the northeast, opposite the souk. It also has a hospital, Centre de Sante.
