= Mohamed Habib Sinaceur =

Moroccan politician (1939–2000)

Mohammed Habib Sinaceur
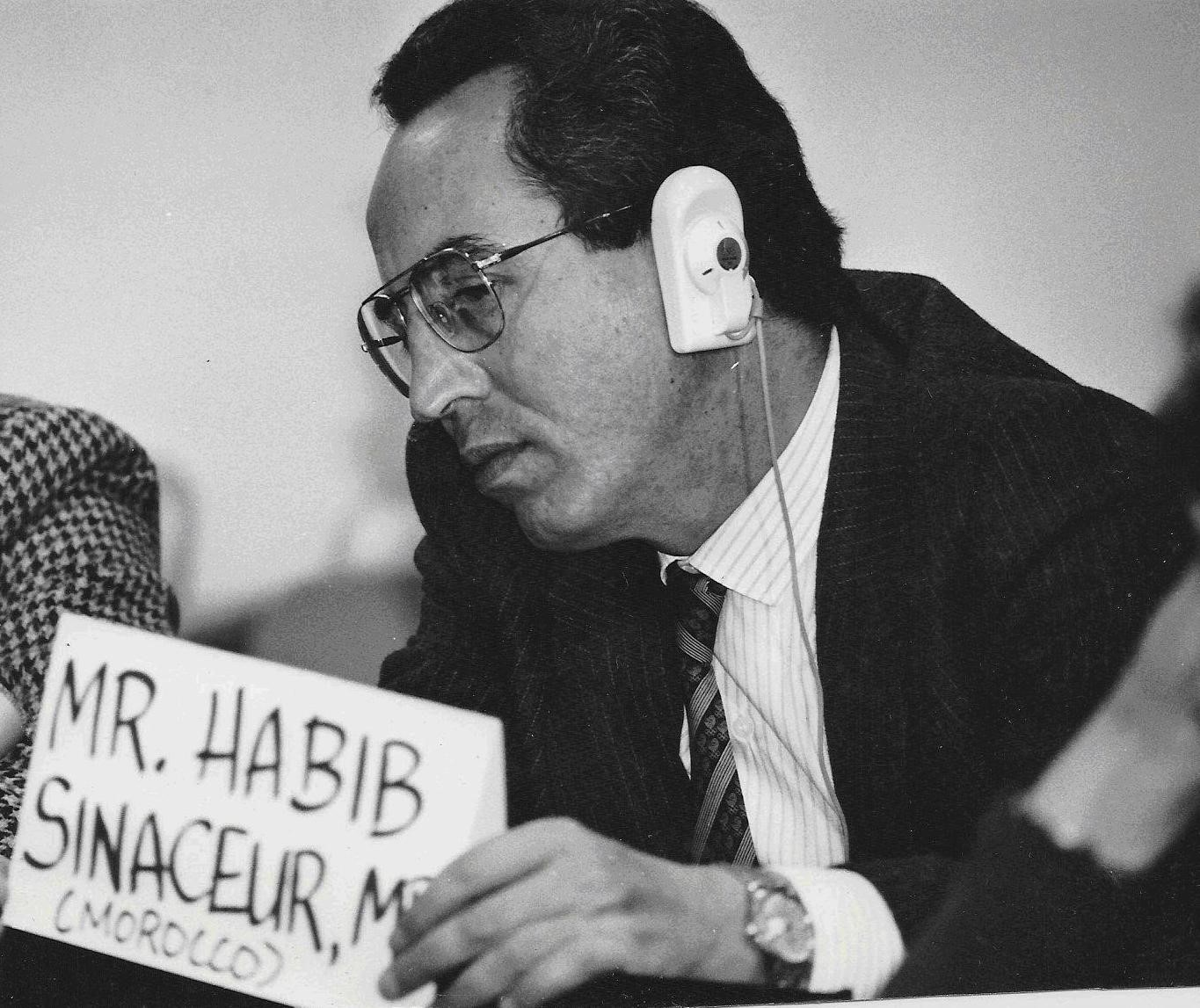
- Born: April 15, 1939; Oujda
- Died: November 3, 2000 (aged 61)
- Occupations: Politician, Professor
- Political party: Socialist Union of Popular Forces

Mohammed Habib Sinaceur (1939 – 2000) was a Moroccan Politician for the Socialist Union of Popular Forces.

== Biography ==
Sinaceur was born in eastern Morocco at Oujda. He is a member of a well connected Moroccan family. His brother Mohammed Allal Sinaceur is a writer working for UNESCO and another, Jamal Eddine Sinaceur, is a diplomat.

Sinaceur died in 2000 and in 2009 a street was named after him in Casablanca. The naming event was seen as a tribute to Sinaceur and his family. His work in human rights, support for education and being a champion for Casablanca was given as reasons for the honour.
