= Abdelkader El Brazi =

Moroccan footballer (1964-2014)

Personal information
- Date of birth: November 5, 1964
- Place of birth: Berkane, Morocco
- Date of death: January 24, 2014 (aged 49)
- Place of death: Rabat, Morocco
- Height: 1.80 m (5 ft 11 in)
- Position: Goalkeeper

Senior career*
Years	Team	Apps	(Gls)
1986–1998	FAR Rabat	?	(0)
1998–2000	Ismaily SC	?	(0)

International career
1989–1998	Morocco	47	(0)
- * Club domestic league appearances and goals

Abdelkader El Brazi (Arabic: عبد القادر البرازي; 5 November 1964 – 24 January 2014) was a Moroccan football goalkeeper.

He started his career as a goalkeeper with his hometown's team Renaissance de Berkane, and played also for FAR Rabat and Ismaily SC.

He played for the Morocco national football team (36 matches) and was a participant at the 1998 FIFA World Cup.

He died on 24 January 2014 after suffering from cancer for several years.
