= Berkane =

Berkane ⴱⵔⴽⴰⵏ (Standard Moroccan Tamazight) بركان (Arabic)
- City
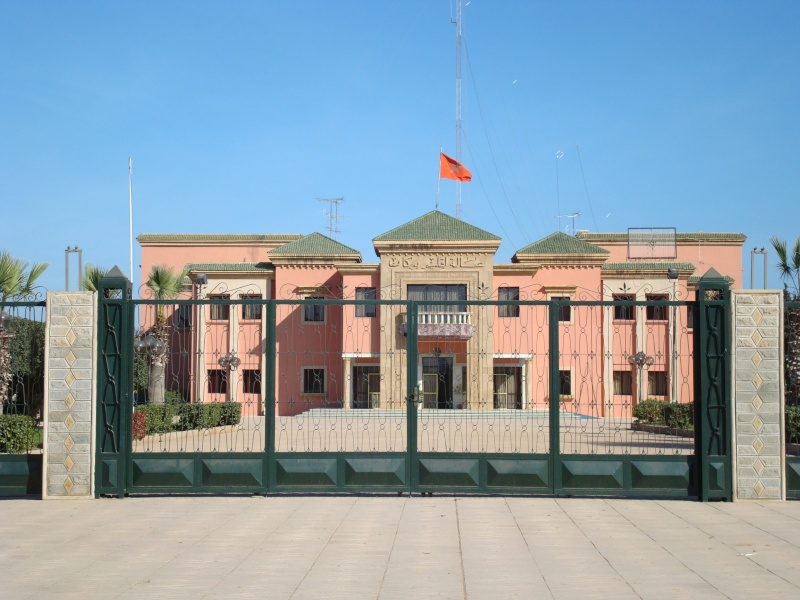
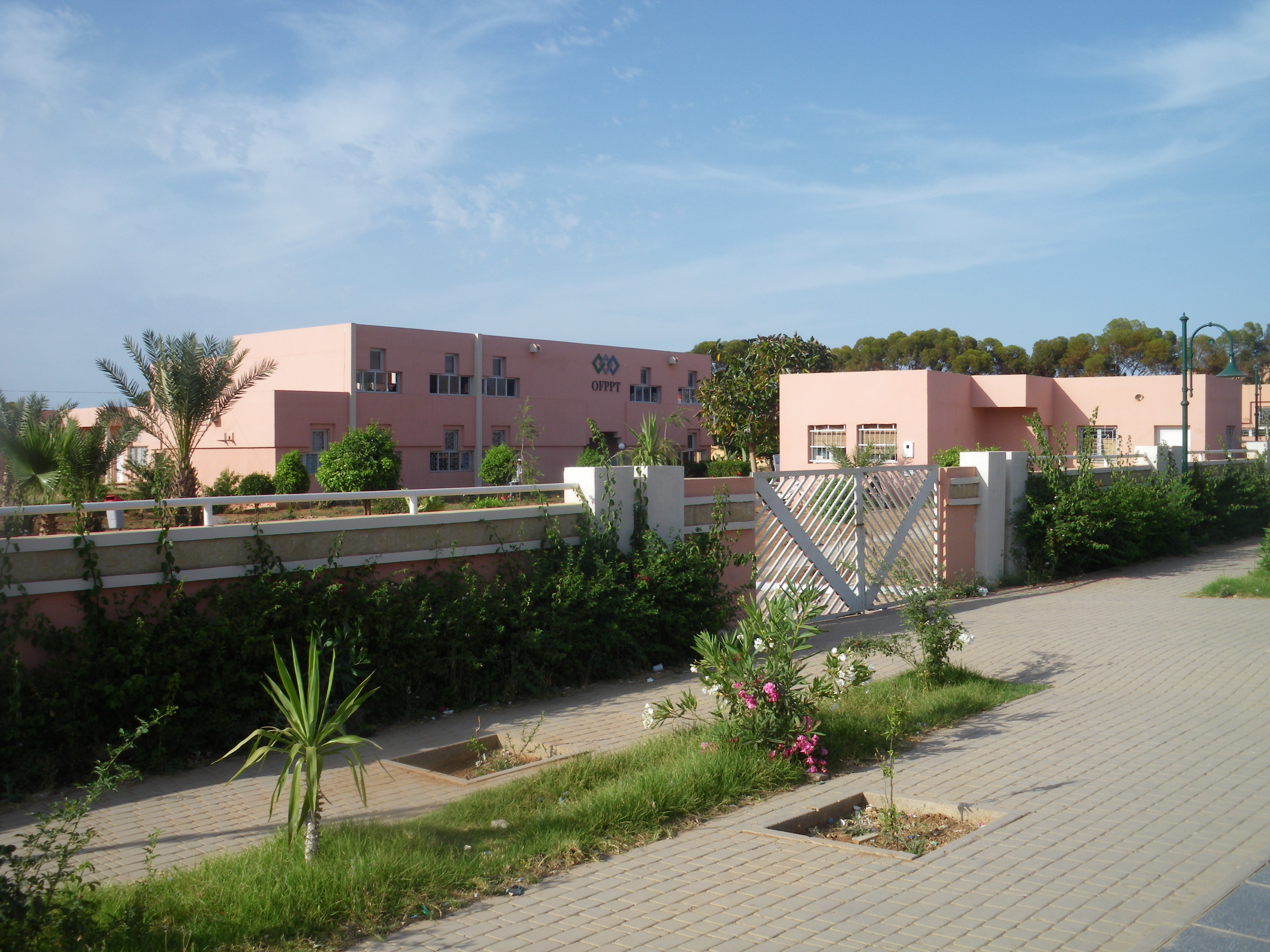
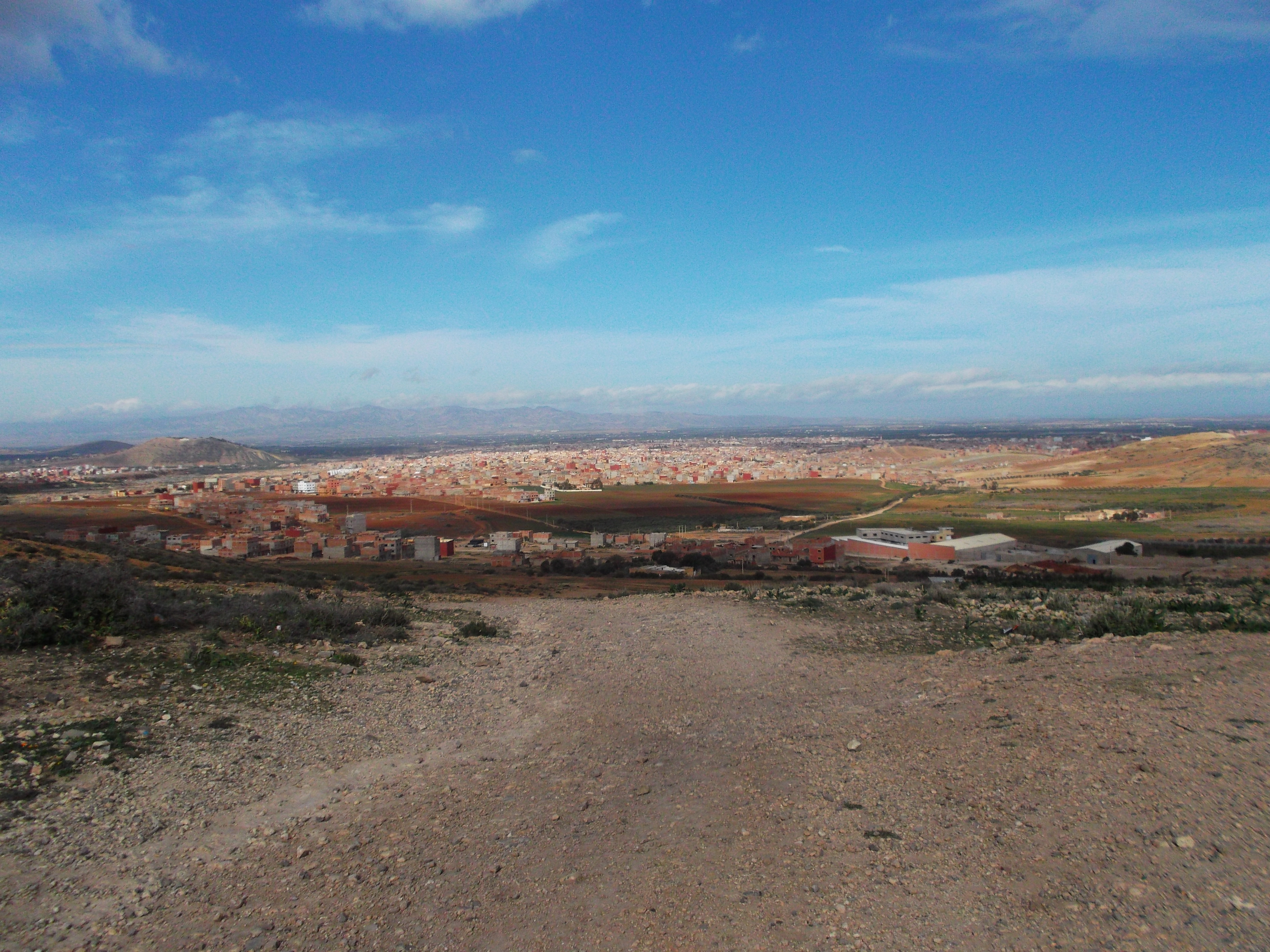
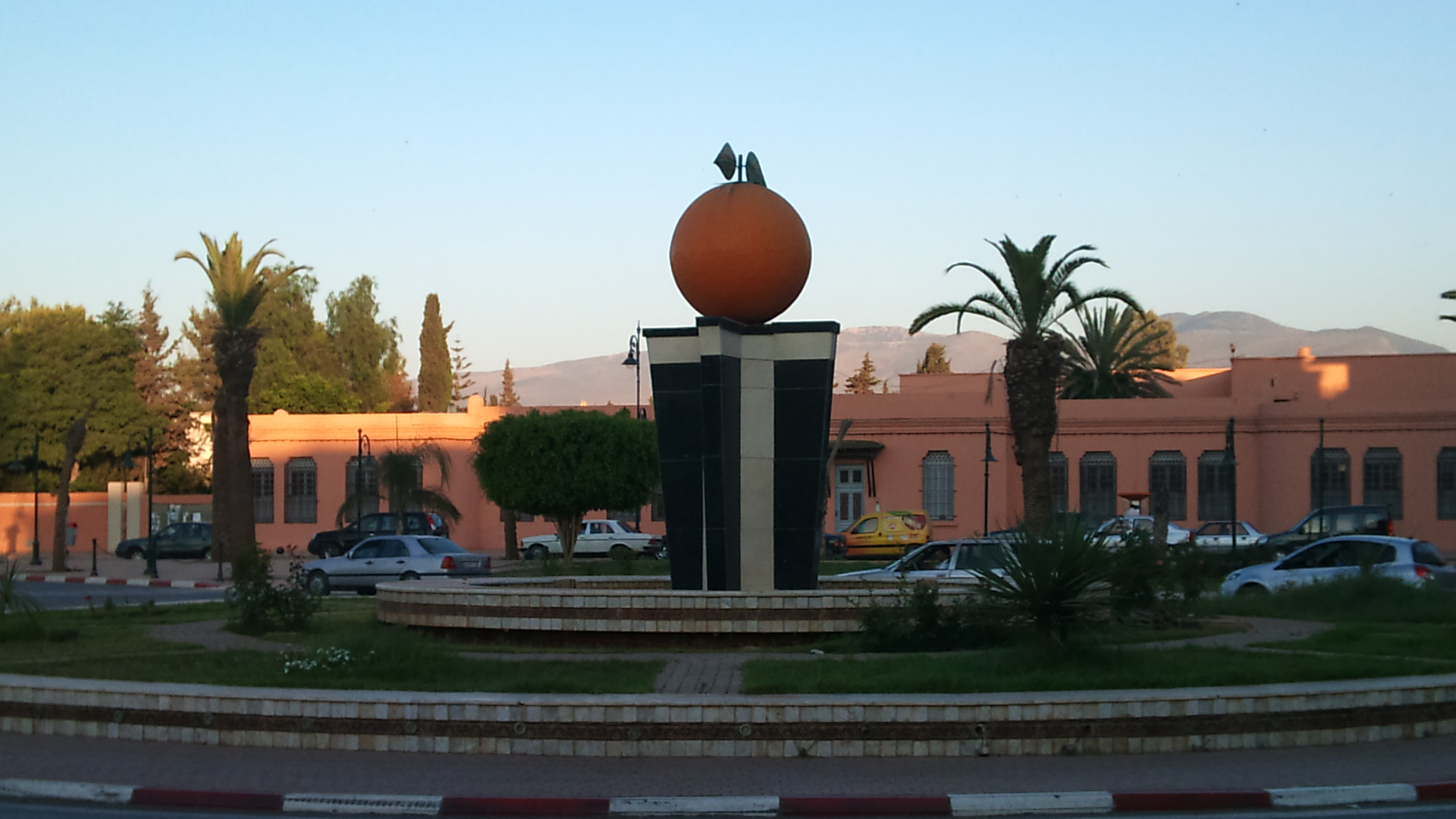
- The clementine sculpture in the city centre of Berkane
- Nickname: Orange City
- Interactive map of Berkane
- Coordinates: 34°55′N 2°19′W
- Country: Morocco
- Region: Oriental
- Province: Berkane

Government
  - Mayor: Mohamed Ibrahimi (PAM)

Population (2014)
  - Total: 109,237
- Time zone: UTC+0 (GMT)
- Postal code: 63300

Berkane (Note: Standard Moroccan Tamazight: ⴱⵔⴽⴰⵏ Arabic: بركان) is a city in northeastern Morocco, on the edge of the Beni Snassen mountains, limited by the Mediterranean Sea to the north, the Kis river (Moroccan-Algerian border) and Oujda-Angad Prefecture in the east, Nador Province to the west, and Taourirt Province in the south. It is the capital of Berkane Province.

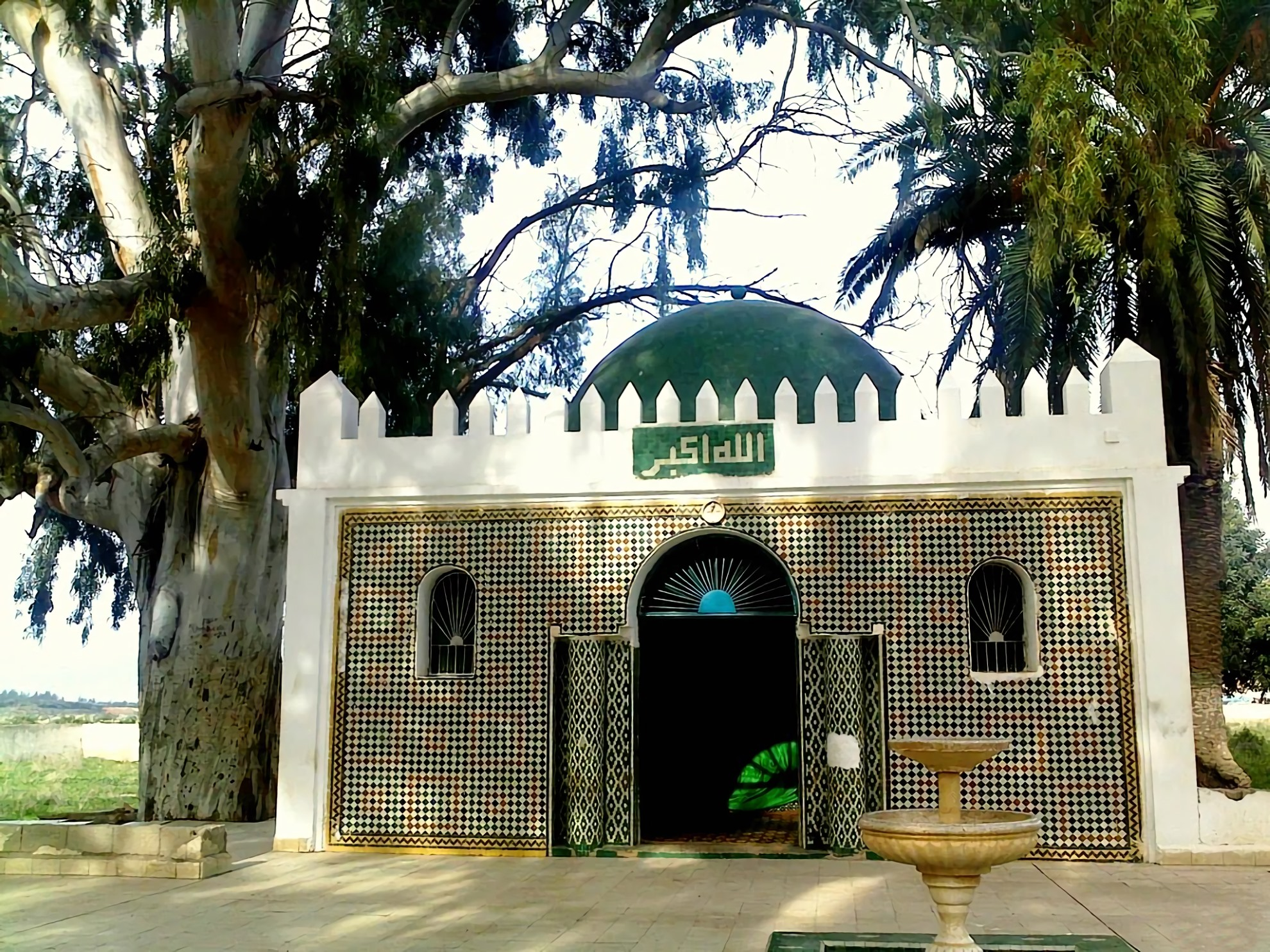
The Mausoleum of Sidi Ahmad Aberkane in Berkane, Morocco.

== Demography ==
The city recorded a population of 109,237 in the 2014 Moroccan census. Moroccan Arabic and Iznasen Berber are spoken.

According to the 2014 census, the population of the Berkane agglomeration is 306,901, that is, an estimated 12.5 percent of the population of the eastern region, with a high density of 145.7 people per square kilometer compared to 25.7 people per square kilometer in relation to the region and a high urbanization rate of 63.2 percent.

The population rose from 368 in 1917 to 3,600 in 1936 and then doubled in 1947, it reached 7,545, then jumped to 20,496 in 1960, then to 60,490 in 1982 and 77,026 in 1994. In the year 1996, the city's population was estimated at 82,000.

== History ==
The city of Berkane is considered an agricultural city as a result of the irrigation policy that colonialism followed, starting in the middle of the first half of the twentieth century, in the major irrigated circles. Especially since it is located on one of the richest plains in Morocco, the Tarifa plain.

The emergence of Berkane as a city, and its development, was linked to the local agricultural wealth. However the administrative leadership of the fledgling city, which abolished the old political entities of the Bni Iznasen tribes, was behind the French political decision in the colonial period to assign the role of direct leadership to Berkane over the neighboring tribes. The development of the agricultural economy and the improvement of the standard of living in the city have contributed to emptying the tribes from their population and displacing the human weight from the mountain fortress to the open plain and facilitated the process of military control of the French occupation of the region. The massive influx of workers in the agriculture sector from different Moroccan regions has also disrupted the homogeneous tribal fabric.

== Climate ==
Berkane features a hot semi‑arid climate (Köppen: BSh) with Mediterranean influences. The city has warm to hot summers and mild winters. Rainfall is irregular and concentrated mainly in autumn and winter, with dry conditions in summer.

According to historical climate data (1991–2020 normals), the annual average temperature is about 18.4 °C, and the area receives roughly 326 mm of precipitation each year. The warmest month is typically August, averaging around 26.0 °C, while January is usually the coolest with an average of about 11.6 °C. The wettest month generally is January and the driest is July.

Climate data for Berkane
Month	Jan	Feb	Mar	Apr	May	Jun	Jul	Aug	Sep	Oct	Nov	Dec	Year
Mean daily maximum °C (°F)	17.2 (63.0)	18.1 (64.6)	20.2 (68.4)	22.0 (71.6)	24.8 (76.6)	28.5 (83.3)	31.8 (89.2)	32.5 (90.5)	29.5 (85.1)	25.6 (78.1)	21.2 (70.2)	18.8 (65.8)	24.2 (75.5)
Mean daily minimum °C (°F)	6.1 (43.0)	7.4 (45.3)	8.9 (48.0)	10.8 (51.4)	13.0 (55.4)	16.4 (61.5)	19.0 (66.2)	19.6 (67.3)	17.3 (63.1)	14.3 (57.7)	10.4 (50.7)	7.1 (44.8)	12.5 (54.5)
Average precipitation mm (inches)	44.4 (1.75)	37.1 (1.46)	30.3 (1.19)	43.2 (1.70)	28.2 (1.11)	6.5 (0.26)	0.9 (0.04)	2.6 (0.10)	23.3 (0.92)	33.7 (1.33)	32.5 (1.28)	43.8 (1.72)	326 (12.8)
Source: "Climate Report – Berkane".

== Economy ==
Berkane is considered a major player in the citrus fruit industry in North-Morocco, and high-quality fresh fruit and vegetables are plentiful year round. It is known for its farms of clementines. Also, a large statue of an orange is at the center of town. It is very close to Saïdia, a popular beach resort town on the Mediterranean, as well as Tafoughalt, a small village in the nearby mountains known for its healthy air and herb markets.

== Sports ==
Berkane's most popular sport club is the association football club RS Berkane. Well known in the continental competitions. RS Berkane have won three major African titles, including two CAF Confederation Cup and one CAF Super Cup.

Berkane is the birthplace of the Olympic athlete Hicham El Guerrouj, who holds the world record for the fastest 1500 metres.

== Notable people ==
- Abdelkader El Brazi, Former international goalkeeper
- Aziz Bouhaddouz, International footballer
- Fouzi Lekjaa, Football administrator and businessman
- Hicham El Guerrouj, Former Olympic athlete, former world record holder for the fastest 2000m and mile, current world record holder in the 1500m
- Mohammed Hendouf, Moroccan-Belgian kickboxer
- Abbas El Fassi, Former Prime Minister of Morocco
- Mbarek Bekkay, 1st Prime Minister of Morocco

== Twin towns – sister cities ==
Berkane is twinned with:

- Bondy, France
- Perpignan, France
- Saint-Gilles, Belgium
- Sint-Truiden, Belgium
- Zeist, Netherlands
