= Meknès-Tafilalet =

Meknès-Tafilalet Meknas-Tafilalt مكناس تافيلالت
- Region
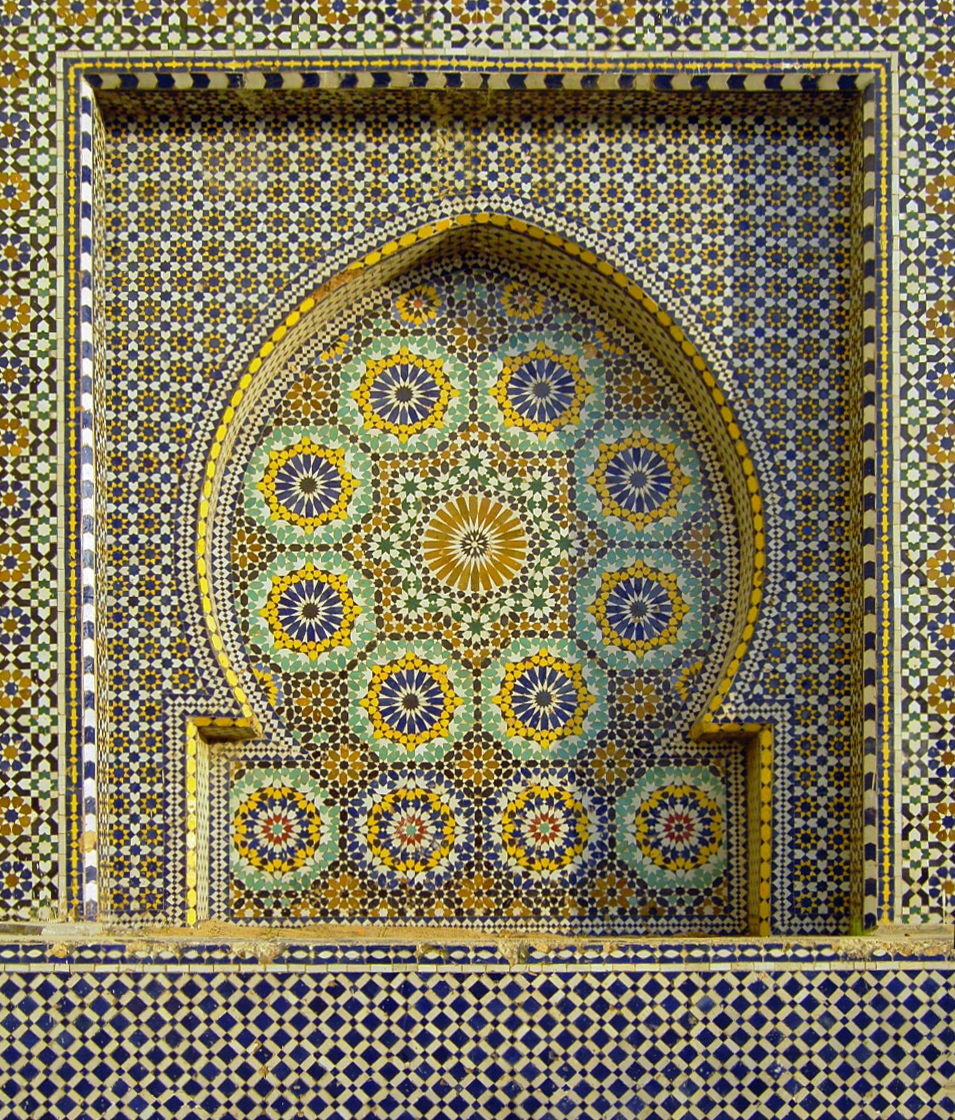
- Mosaic fountain, Meknes

- Location in Morocco
- Coordinates: 33°53′N 5°33′W
- Country: Morocco
- Established: March 1997
- Abolished: September 2015
- Capital: Meknès

Area
  - Total: 79,210 km^{2} (30,580 sq mi)

Population (2014 census)
  - Total: 2,316,865
- Time zone: UTC+0 (WET)
  - Summer (DST): UTC+1 (WEST)

Meknès-Tafilalt (Arabic: مكناس تافيلالت (Meknes-Tafilelt)) was one of the sixteen former regions of Morocco that existed from 1997 to 2015. It was situated in north-central Morocco, bordering Algeria. It covered an area of 79,210 km² and recorded a population of 2,316,865 in the 2014 census. The capital was Meknes.

== Administrative divisions ==
The region was subdivided into the following prefectures and provinces:

- Meknès Prefecture (now part of the Fès-Meknès Region)
- El Hajeb Province (now part of the Fès-Meknès Region)
- Errachidia Province (now part of the Drâa-Tafilalet Region)
- Ifrane Province (now part of the Fès-Meknès Region)
- Khénifra Province (now part of the Béni Mellal-Khénifra Region)
- Midelt Province (now part of the Drâa-Tafilalet Region)
