= Taourirt Province =

Coordinates: 34°24′20″N 2°54′01″W

Taourirt Province إقليم تاوريرت ⵜⴰⵙⴳⴰ ⵏ ⵜⵡⵔⵉⵔⵜ
- Province
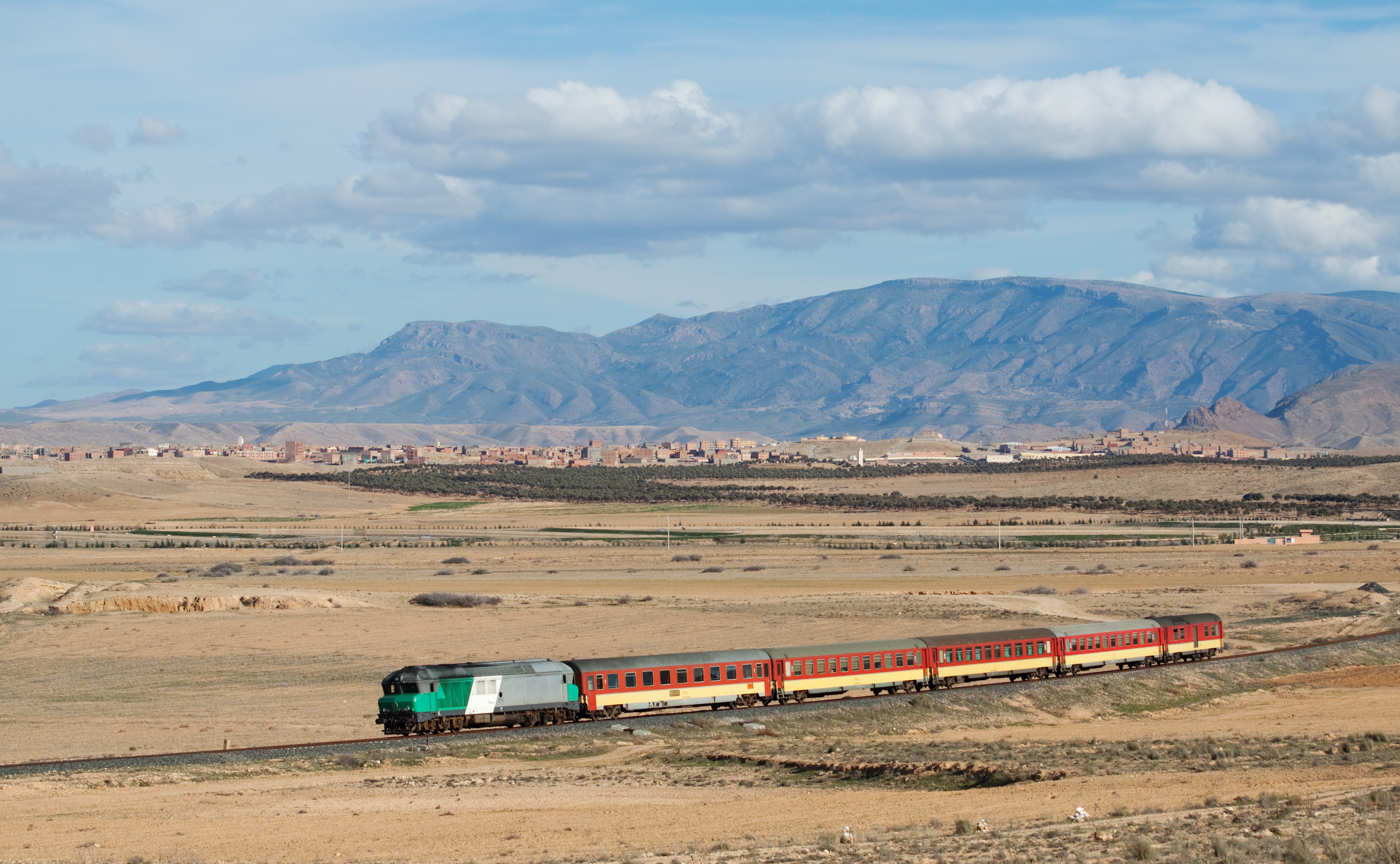
- Interactive map of Taourirt Province
- Country: Morocco
- Region: Oriental
- Capital: Taourirt

Population (2024)
  - Total: 220,157

Taourirt (Arabic: تاوريرت, Standard Moroccan Tamazight: ⵜⴰⵡⵔⵉⵔⵜ) is a province in the Oriental Region of Morocco. Its population in 2024 was 220,157

The major cities and towns are:

- Debdou
- El Aioun Sidi Mellouk
- Taourirt

== Subdivisions ==
The province is divided administratively into the following:

Name	Geographic code	Type	Households	Population (2004)	Foreign population	Moroccan population	Notes
Debdou	533.01.13.	Municipality	908	4540	7	4533	
El Aioun Sidi Mellouk	533.01.15.	Municipality	6379	34767	53	34714	
Taourirt	533.01.33.	Municipality	14613	80024	104	79920	
El Atef	533.03.05.	Rural commune	350	2471	0	2471	
Oulad M'Hammed	533.03.15.	Rural commune	326	2174	0	2174	
Sidi Ali Belkassem	533.03.17.	Rural commune	1865	13919	1	13918	
Sidi Lahsen	533.03.19.	Rural commune	1302	9759	5	9754	
Ain Lehjer	533.07.03.	Rural commune	1443	9210	4	9206	
Mechraa Hammadi	533.07.09.	Rural commune	1150	7435	1	7434	
Mestegmer	533.07.13.	Rural commune	1094	6378	1	6377	
Tancherfi	533.07.21.	Rural commune	1088	7452	0	7452	
Ahl Oued Za	533.09.01.	Rural commune	2161	14202	5	14197	
Gteter	533.09.07.	Rural commune	946	6732	0	6732	
Melg El Ouidane	533.09.11.	Rural commune	1251	7699	1	7698	
