= Simon Basinger =

French musicologist and essayist

- Born: 1957 (age 68–69); Oujda, Morocco
- Occupations: Musicologist, essayist, producer, author

Simon Basinger (born 1957) is a French musicologist and essayist.

== Early life and education ==
Simon Basinger was born in Oujda, Morocco in 1957, in a family that has had musicians over three generations.

He began his music studies at the Conservatory of Nanterre, Versailles, and then attended the Conservatoire National Superieur de Musique et de Danse de Paris, where he studied musicology and composition. Meanwhile, he found employment in the theater, as an assistant to Pierre Debauche in the Théâtre Nanterre-Amandiers (1974).

After studying literature and philosophy, he obtained a professorship but decided instead to pursue a career in the world of art. He wrote a thesis on Kabuki and Noh theater, an essay on Reynaldo Hahn with Paul Dube (Montreal), and a biography of Antônio Carlos Jobim. In 1975, he met Roland Petit, Erté, Yves Saint-Laurent, Michel Colombier the Casino de Paris and was artistically inspired.

== Artistic career ==
In 1975, he became the youngest assistant (staging) of the company Renaud-Barrault alongside Madeleine Renaud and Jean-Louis Barrault in the théâtre d'Orsay-gare d'Orsay in Paris. He worked with Simone Benmussa on the latest editions of Cahiers Renaud-Barrault, and met Marguerite Duras, Samuel Beckett, Marie-Helene Dasté, Catherine Eckerle, and Madeleine Milhaud.

He participated alongside Jean-Louis Barrault in the production of Christopher Columbus by Claudel and Milhaud, and Thus Spoke Zarathustra by Nietzsche.

In 2000, he worked with the Arte TV network on the documentary Jean Genet...l'Autre (France Television), produced by Richard Trank in association with the Simon Wiesenthal Center (Los Angeles).

In 2002, in collaboration with the National Foundation for Gerontology, he produced a documentary on music and gerontology, entitled Le Jardin d'hiver ("The Winter Garden") for France 3 TV Aquitaine and NGF.

In 2003, wrote the libretto of the Kippur Oratorio for narrator, soprano, tenor, children's choir and string orchestra, set to music by C. Max Jehuda Ewert of Germany for the Avant-garde Festival of Munich.

In 2004, he published La French, a look at art in Europe for Francophone audiences in Florida.

In 2005, he worked at the Música Popular Brasileira (popular music of Brazil) exhibit at the Cité de la Musique in Paris, and published an essay on Antonio Carlos Jobim and his influence on music in Brazil. He wrote a series of poems for in English the American series Nexus about philosophy and raison d'être.

In 2006–2007, he worked with Issa Nyaphaga and Dezza Nguembock to promote the shows Bigna and Esthetique & Handicap for Afrik'DEZ'Arts, an international art association, in collaboration with the Cameroon Embassy in Paris.

In September 2007, he took the Cahiers Renaud-Barrault created by Simone Benmussa and re-infused it with a modern adaptation. In September 2008, the creation of Je Me Souviens de Toi ("I Remember You") was commissioned by Radio France, with text by Mathieu Carrière and music of Henryk Gorecki. A short version aired on the show Contes du Jour et de la Nuit in France with Véronique Sauger as producer.

== Poulenc ==
Since 1990, Basinger has been passionate about the composer Francis Poulenc. He has written a series of books called Cahiers de Francis Poulenc which look at the life and work of the composer. The work is supported by the Association of Friends of Francis Poulenc and supervised by Georges Prêtre, and by many artists.

== Recent activities ==
Basinger is a contributor to the publications of the Barcelona Opera, and writes a column called "Arts & Spectacles" for the South Florida Sun Sentinel. In 2010 he published a poetry collection called À la manière de... ("How To..."), a collection of poems written between the years 1980 and 2000, in the manner of Cocteau, Eluard, and Prévert, prefaced by Véronique Sauger, and a children's book titled Un Morceau de Ciel ("A Piece of Heaven") (éditions Eastern-Press).

== Notes and references ==
- les Cahiers de Francis Poulenc, Editions Michel de Maule, Paris
