= Oriental (Morocco) =

Region of Morocco

Oriental Region جهة الشرق (Arabic) ⵜⴰⵎⵏⴰⴹⵜ ⵏ ⵉⵎⵉⵏⴳ (Standard Moroccan Tamazight)
- Region
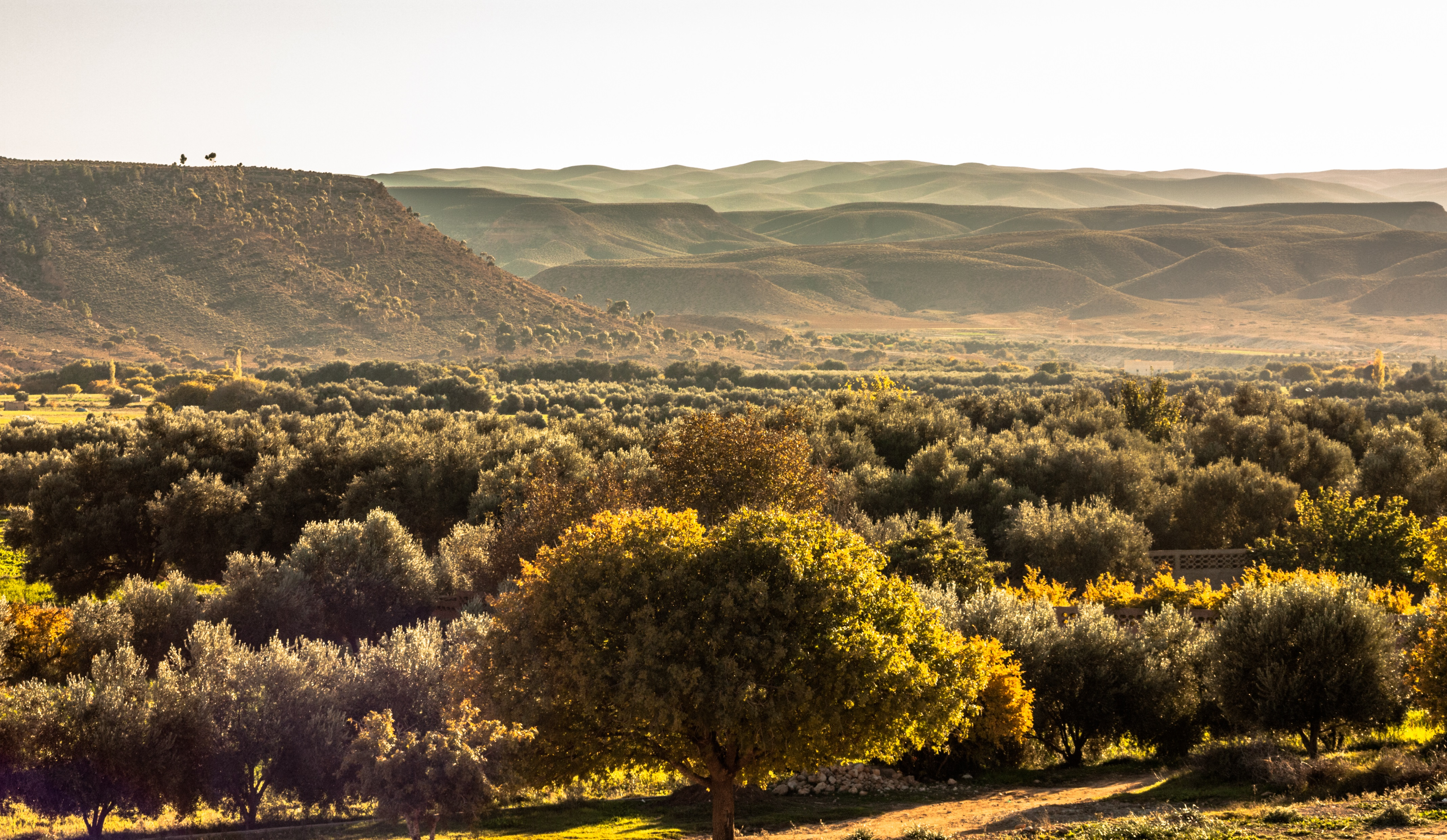
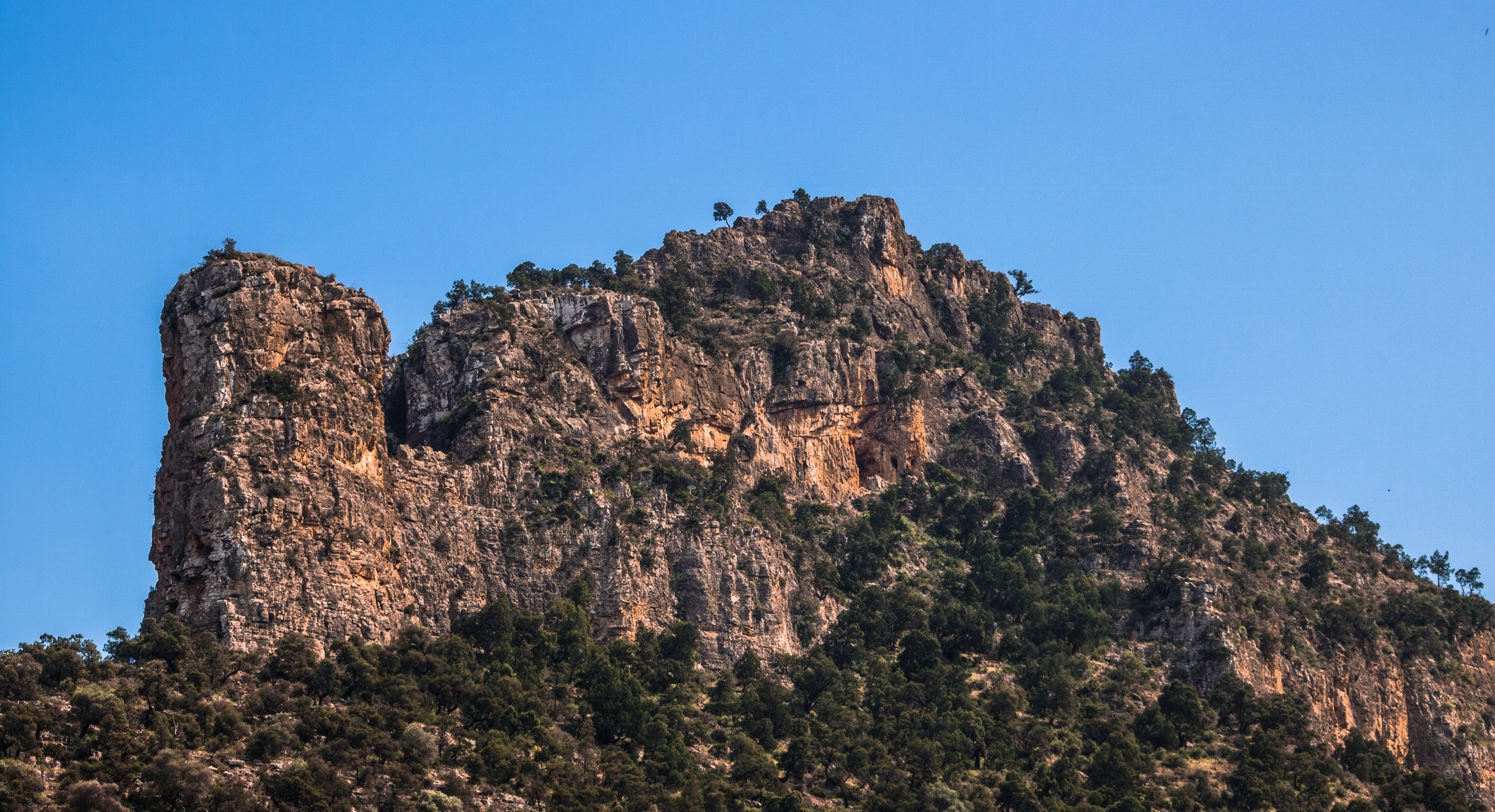

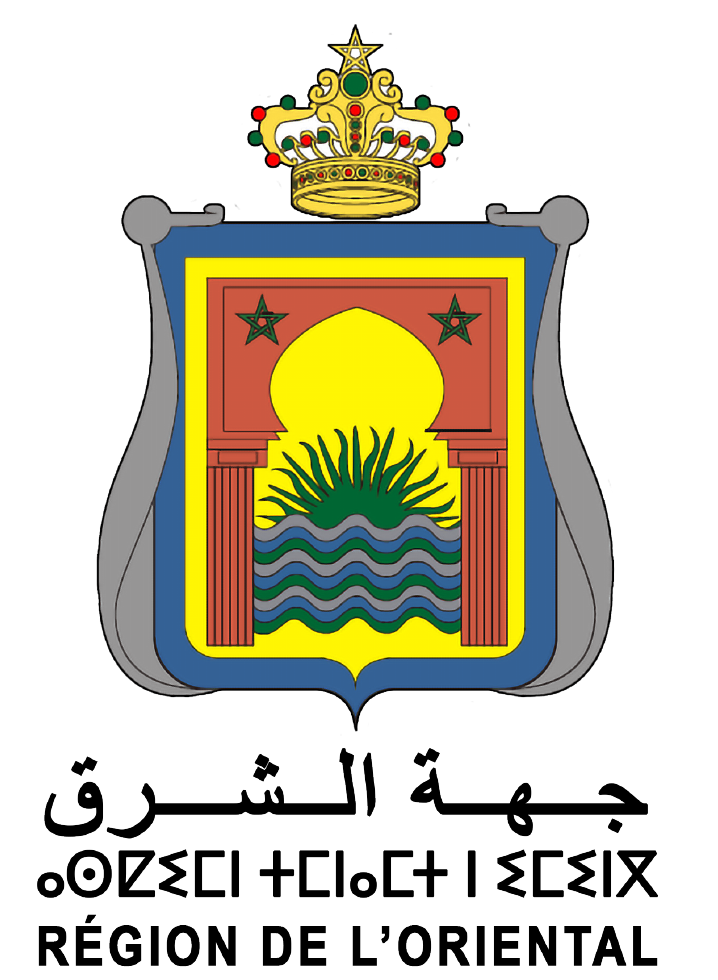
- Seal

- Location in Morocco
- Coordinates: 34°41′N 1°54′W
- Country: Morocco
- Capital: Oujda

Government
  - Wali: Mhamed Atfaoui
  - President: Abdenbi Baiyoui (PAM)

Area
  - Total: 90,127 km^{2} (34,798 sq mi)

Population (2024)
  - Total: 2,269,378
  - Rank: 8th out of 12 Regions
  - Density: 25.180/km^{2} (65.215/sq mi)
- Time zone: UTC+0 (GMT)
- ISO 3166 code: MA-02
- Website: conseilregionoriental.ma

The Oriental region (Note: Arabic: الشرق, romanized: aš-šarq Standard Moroccan Tamazight: ⵉⵎⵉⵏⴳ, romanized: iming) is one of the twelve regions of Morocco, located in the north-eastern part of the country. With an area of 90,127 km^{2} and a population of 2,269,378 (2024 census), it is the easternmost region of Morocco.

The capital and the largest city is Oujda, and the second largest city is Nador. The region includes 7 provinces and one prefecture.

The majority of the population of the Oriental Region speaks Moroccan Arabic (86.2%) as a first or second language. According to the 2024 census, 31.1% of the inhabitants of the Oriental Region speak Tarifit. Small numbers speak Eastern Middle Atlas Tamazight and Figuig Tamazight, principally in the south of Oriental.

== Etymology ==
The English name Oriental is derived from the French term L'Oriental (for "the east") and comes directly from the Latin orientalis, "of the east", being that the region is located in the east of Morocco. The Arabic name Ash-Sharq also means "the east".

== History ==
On 19 October 2025, Mhamed Atfaoui was appointed Wali of the Oriental region and Governor of the Oujda Angad prefecture by King Mohammed VI, during a Council of Ministers meeting in Rabat.

== Geography ==
Oriental is situated in the northeastern part of the country, with a northern coastline on the Mediterranean Sea. The region of Tangier-Tetouan-Al Hoceima, lie to its northwest, Taza-Fès-Meknès to its west, Drâa-Tafilalet to the southwest, with the Algerian provinces of Tlemcen and Naâma to its east and Béchar to the south. Melilla, a Spanish autonomous city, also borders the region. In 2015, Oriental was expanded to include Guercif Province.

== Government ==
=== Subdivisons ===
The region is made up into the following prefectures and provinces:

Provinces of Oriental

- Berkane Province
- Driouch Province
- Figuig Province
- Guercif Province
- Jerada Province
- Nador Province
- Oujda-Angad Prefecture
- Taourirt Province

=== Regional leadership ===
Wali of Oriental since 2015
Name	Duration	Under
Mohamed Mhidia	2015–2017	King Mohammed VI
Mouaad Jamaï	2017–2024	King Mohammed VI
Khatib El Hebil	2024–2025	King Mohammed VI
Mhamed Atfaoui	2025–present	King Mohammed VI

Regional Council Presidents of Oriental since 2015
Name	Duration	Party	Under
Abdenbi Bioui	2015–2024	PAM	King Mohammed VI
Mohamed Bouarourou	2024–present	PAM	King Mohammed VI

== Municipalities by population ==
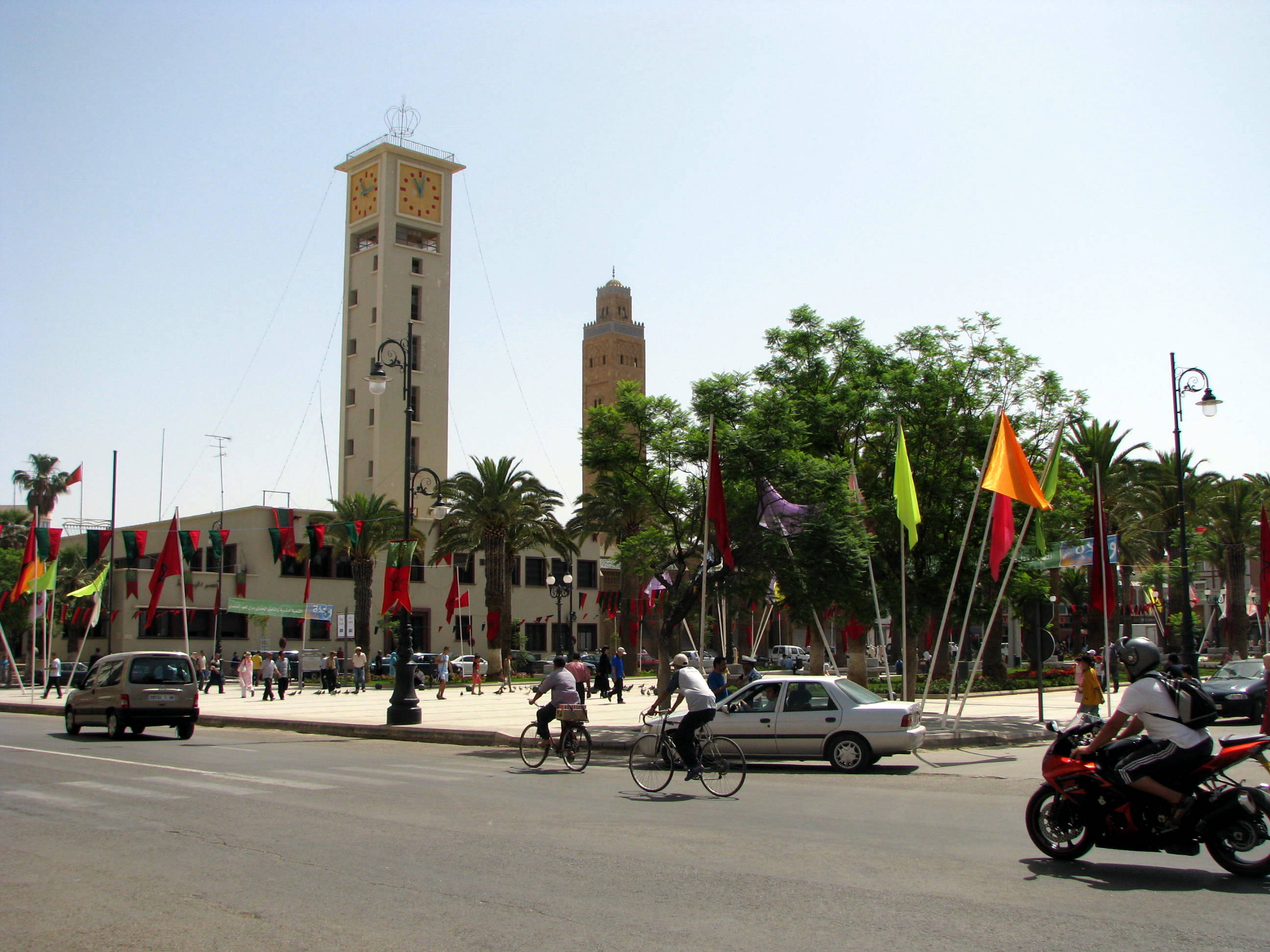
Main square of Oujda, the regional capital and largest city.

Name	Province/Prefecture	Population (2014)
Oujda	Oujda-Angad Prefecture	494,252
Nador	Nador Province	161,726
Berkane	Berkane Province	109,237
Taourirt	Taourirt Province	103,398
Beni Ensar / Aït Nsar	Nador Province	56,582
Al Aaroui	Nador Province	47,599
Jerada	Jerada Province	43,506
El Aioun Sidi Mellouk	Taourirt Province	41,832
Bouarg	Nador Province	37,737
Zaio	Nador Province	35,806
Zeghanghane	Nador Province	34,025
Sidi Slimane Echcharraa	Berkane Province	30,202
Bouarfa	Figuig Province	28,846
Bni Chiker	Nador Province	26,884
Oulad Settout	Nador Province	23,218
Selouane	Nador Province	21,570
Boughriba	Berkane Province	20,513
Ahfir	Berkane Province	19,630
Arekmane	Nador Province	18,490
Mtalssa	Driouch Province	16,787
Talsint	Figuig Province	16,166
Bni Tadjite	Figuig Province	16,149
Zegzel	Berkane Province	16,137
Tendrara	Figuig Province	15,390
Midar	Driouch Province	17,042
Driouch	Driouch Province	14,741
Ben Taieb	Driouch Province	14,257
Temsamane	Driouch Province	13,920
Ain Bni Mathar	Jerada Province	13,526
Figuig	Figuig Province	12,516

== Notable people ==
=== Arts & Cinema ===
- Hafid Bouazza, writer
- Hamid Bouchnak, Moroccan raï singer and songwriter
- Nathalie Delon, actress and director
- Douzi, singer and songwriter
- Les Freres Megri, rock band very popular in the Arab world, composers and producers.
- Philippe Faucon, filmmaker
- Fouad Laroui, writer and economist
- Michel Qissi, actor
- Mimoun El Oujdi, Raï singer
- Younes Megri, actor, singer author of 'Leli Touil' sung by Maria de Rossi & Boney M.
- Abdelkrim Derkaoui, cinematographer, film director and screenwriter
- Bassouar Al Maghnaoui, singer
- Cheikh Mohamed Salah Chaabane, musician, gharnati music
- Simon Basinger, musicologist, essayist, producer and author
- Charlotte Slovack, filmmaker
- Douzi, pop singer
- Serge Guirao, singer
- Bayane Belayachi, singer
- Elwalid Mimoun, artist
- Khalid izri, artist
- Namika, musician
- Mohamed Choukri, writer

=== Sports ===
- Hakim Ziyech, international footballer, semi-final World Cup 2022
- Adil Belgaid, Olympic judo fighter (3 times World Champion, 6 times African Champion, 3 times Arab Champion, 3 times Olympian)
- Achraf Ouchen, professional karateka
- Abdelatif Benazzi, rugby player
- Philippe Casado, cyclist
- Selim Amallah, football player
- Abdelkarim Kissi, footballer
- Soufiane Kourdou, professional basketball player
- Moha Rharsalla, footballer
- Mohammed Qissi, actor, kickboxer, (Bloodsport with Jean Claude Vandamme)
- Mohcin Cheaouri, track and field athlete, 2 times African champion
- Yahya Berrabah, Olympic athlete, African champion in long jump
- Daniel Sanchez, footballer
- Gilles Simon, Formula 1
- Ahmed Belkedroussi, football manager
- Khadfi Rharsallah, footballer
- Marianne Agulhon, slalom canoeist
- Mohammed Berrabeh, international footballer
- Hassan Alla, footballer
- Mohammed Ben Brahim, footballer
- Khalid Chalqi, footballer
- Gerard Soler, football midfielder
- Khalid Lebji, football midfielder
- Abou El Kacem Hadji, footballer
- Ryad El Alami, footballer
- Abdelah Kafifi, footballer
- Mohamed Atmani, boxer (Summer Olympics)
- Soufiane Kourdou, basketball player
- Houssam Amaanan, footballer
- Habib Allah Dahmani, footballer
- Abdelkader El Brazi, former international goalkeeper
- Aziz Bouhaddouz, international footballer
- Fouzi Lekjaa, football administrator and businessman
- Hicham El Guerrouj, former Olympic athlete, world record holder for the fastest mile also the current world record holder in the 1500m and 2000m
- Mohammed Hendouf, Moroccan-Belgian kickboxer

=== Politics & Diplomats ===
- Ahmed Osman, former prime minister, married King Hassan II's sister, Lalla Nuzha of Morocco
- Zoulikha Nasri, advisor to King Mohammed IV, MD of foundation 'Mohammed V for Solidarity'
- Muhammad Ben Abdessalam Al Muqri, late 19th senior official, advisor and grand vizier to several sultans
- Abdelkader Lecheheb, football player and Ambassador to Russia
- Mohamed Allal Sinaceur, former Minister of Cultural Affairs
- Jamal Benomar, politician
- Ahmed Aboutaleb, politician
- Mohamed Habib Sinaceur, politician
- Ahmed Toufiq Hejira, former Minister of Housing and Urbanism
- Kaddour El Ouartassi, historian
- Najima Rhozali, politician, professor
- Yvette Katan Bensamoun, historian
- Omar Benjelloun, journalist
- Abdelaziz Bouteflika, (1937–2021), 5th President of Algeria
- Abdelnour Abbrous, politician
- Chakib Khelil, politician
- Hassnae Bouazza, journalist, writer, columnist
- Louisette Ighilariz, politician
- Najat Vallaud-Belkacem, politician
- Germain Ayache, historian

=== Other ===
- Abdelrazzak Hifti, 2022 World Cup team doctor
- Maurice Levy, French businessman, chairman of Publicis Group
