= Regions of Morocco =

Regions of Morocco جهات المغرب (Arabic) ⵜⵉⵎⵏⴰⴹⵉⵏ ⵏ ⵍⵎⵖⵔⵉⴱ (Standard Moroccan Tamazight)
- Map of the regions of Morocco
- Category: Unitary state
- Location: Kingdom of Morocco
- Number: 12
- Populations: 219,965 (Dakhla-Oued Ed-Dahab) – 7,688,967 (Casablanca-Settat)
- Government: Regional council
- Subdivisions: Provinces and prefectures

Moroccan administrative division

Regions are the highest administrative divisions of Morocco. Since the territorial reform of 2015, the country has been divided into 12 regions, including one (Dakhla-Oued Ed-Dahab) located entirely within the disputed territory of Western Sahara, and two (Laâyoune-Sakia El Hamra and Guelmim-Oued Noun) located partially within it. The regions are subdivided into 75 second-level administrative divisions, consisting of prefectures and provinces.

Each region is governed by a directly elected regional council. The president of the council is responsible for implementing its decisions. Prior to the 2011 constitutional reforms, this role was held by the wali, the representative of the central government appointed by the King. The wali now plays a coordinating and supervisory role in regional administration.

== Regions since 2015 ==
On 3 January 2010, the Moroccan government established the Consultative Commission for Regionalization (CCR), with the aim of promoting decentralization and granting greater autonomy to the regions, particularly in relation to the issue of Western Sahara. The commission proposed provisional names and boundaries for the new regions.

The names and number of the regions were officially established by decree in the Bulletin Officiel dated 5 March 2015.

Following the reform, the newly created regional councils elected their presidents on 14 September 2015, and the regional governors (walis) were appointed on 13 October 2015.

Map number	Region	Capital	Population (2014)	Population (2024)
6	Casablanca-Settat	Casablanca	6,861,739	7,688,967
4	Rabat-Salé-Kénitra	Rabat	4,580,866	5,132,639
7	Marrakesh-Safi	Marrakesh	4,520,569	4,892,393
3	Fez-Meknes	Fez	4,236,892	4,467,911
1	Tangier-Tetouan-Al Hoceima	Tangier	3,556,729	4,030,222
9	Souss-Massa	Agadir	2,676,847	3,020,431
5	Béni Mellal-Khénifra	Beni Mellal	2,520,776	2,525,801
2	Oriental	Oujda	2,314,346	2,294,665
8	Drâa-Tafilalet	Errachidia	1,635,008	1,655,623
11	Laâyoune-Sakia El Hamra^{[A]}	Laayoune	367,758	451,028
10	Guelmim-Oued Noun^{[A]}	Guelmim	433,757	448,685
12	Dakhla-Oued Ed-Dahab^{[A]}	Dakhla	142,955	219,965

A. Lies partially or completely within the disputed territory of Western Sahara.

Main proposal

Alternative proposal with
Midelt Province in Fès-Meknès (3) instead of Béni Mellal-Khénifra (5)

Alternative proposal with
Figuig Province in Oriental (2) instead of Drâa-Tafilalet (8)

The different regional configurations proposed in 2010

== 1997 to 2015: Full unitary system ==
Between 1997 and 2015, Morocco had 16 regions.

The old regions of Morocco (1997–2015)

Map number	Region	Capital
1	Oued Ed-Dahab-Lagouira	Dakhla
2	Laâyoune-Boujdour-Sakia El Hamra	Laâyoune
3	Guelmim-Es Semara	Guelmim
4	Souss-Massa-Drâa	Agadir
5	Gharb-Chrarda-Béni Hssen	Kénitra
6	Chaouia-Ouardigha	Settat
7	Marrakech-Tensift-El Haouz	Marrakesh
8	Oriental	Oujda
9	Grand Casablanca	Casablanca
10	Rabat-Salé-Zemmour-Zaer	Rabat
11	Doukkala-Abda	Safi
12	Tadla-Azilal	Béni Mellal
13	Meknès-Tafilalet	Meknès
14	Fès-Boulemane	Fès
15	Taza-Al Hoceima-Taounate	Al Hoceima
16	Tangier-Tetouan	Tangier

The entirety of Oued Ed-Dahab-Lagouira (1), the vast majority of Laâyoune-Boujdour-Sakia El Hamra (2), and part of Guelmim-Es Semara (3) were situated within the disputed territory of Western Sahara. The sovereignty of Western Sahara is disputed between Morocco and the Polisario Front which claims the territory as the independent Sahrawi Arab Democratic Republic. Most of the region is administered by Morocco as its Southern Provinces. The Polisario Front, based in headquarters at Tindouf in south western Algeria, controls only those areas east of the Moroccan Wall.

== Regions before 1997 ==
Before 1997, Morocco was divided into seven regions: Central, Eastern, North-Central, Northwestern, South-Central, Southern, and Tansift.

Dahir No. 1-59-351 of 1 Jumada II 1379 (December 2, 1959) regarding the territorial division of the Kingdom establishes an administrative organization structured around several levels of territorial collectivities, notably prefectures and communes.

Over the decades, several territorial redistricting measures were implemented to reflect demographic and administrative changes. Provinces were gradually established alongside prefectures, helping to further structure the territorial organization.

== See also ==
- ISO 3166-2:EH – Entry for Western Sahara in ISO 3166-2
- ISO 3166-2:MA (2004)
