= Guelaya =

- Riffian tribe
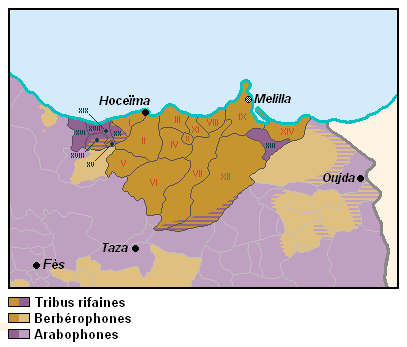
- The Guelaya are indicated with IX
- Country: Morocco
- Region: Oriental
- Province: Nador
- Time zone: UTC+1 (CET)

Guelaya, also known as Iqer'iyen and Iqel'iyen is a region in northern Morocco located in the present-day province of Nador and a composition of central-eastern Riffian tribes. The region encompasses the Cape Three Forks peninsula, the Mar Chica area, and other surrounding zones, historically including the Spanish city of Melilla.

== Composition ==
The Iqer'iyen tribe is composed of five major Berber tribes, locally known as "khams khemmas", meaning "five-fifths":

1. Beni Chiker
2. Beni Sidel
3. Beni Bouyafar
4. Mazzuja
5. Beni Bouifrour

These tribes themselves comprise various territorial communities and families. Historically, each tribe was an autonomous entity that contributed to the collective defense, resource management, and social cohesion of the confederation as a whole.

== Name ==
The area around Nador has been known at least since the 11th century by the name ‘‘Bilād al‑Qulūʿ’’ (Arabic for “Land of the Castles”). From this name, the ethnonym of the local Riffians, Iqelʿiyen (“People of the Castles”), is derived.

== History ==
The Area has been inhabited between Between the ninth and eleventh centuries by the Beni Urtedi.

In the west of it lay the ruins of Cazaza, in the east Melilla and in the center the ruins of Tazouda Castle.

In the 11th century, prior to the rise of the Almoravids in the Maghreb Al-Aqsa, an emirate of Hammudid origin emerged within the tribal territory of the Iqer'iyen. Muhammad ibn Idris Al-Hammudi, a deposed prince of Malaga and Ceuta, had taken refuge in Almeria when he was called upon by the Berbers of the Guelaya tribal territory, known at the time as the Battuya, to assume power in the eastern Rif. Central to this development was an alliance with the Battuya tribe.

== Geography ==
Geographically it is considered the largest Riffian tribe. Guelaya is in the eastern Rif located on the Cap des Trois Fourches. Mount Gurugu lies mostly within the area.

It covers an area of approximately 6,200 km². It is bordered to the west by the Nekor River, to the east by the Moulouya River, to the north by the Mediterranean Sea, and to the south by the Beni Bouhaya mountain range.

== Traditions ==
Riffian communities maintain numerous traditional practices, some of which are still practiced today, such as traditional Tattoos and Henna.
