= Beni Sidel =

Beni Sidel Tarifit: Ayt Sider
- Town
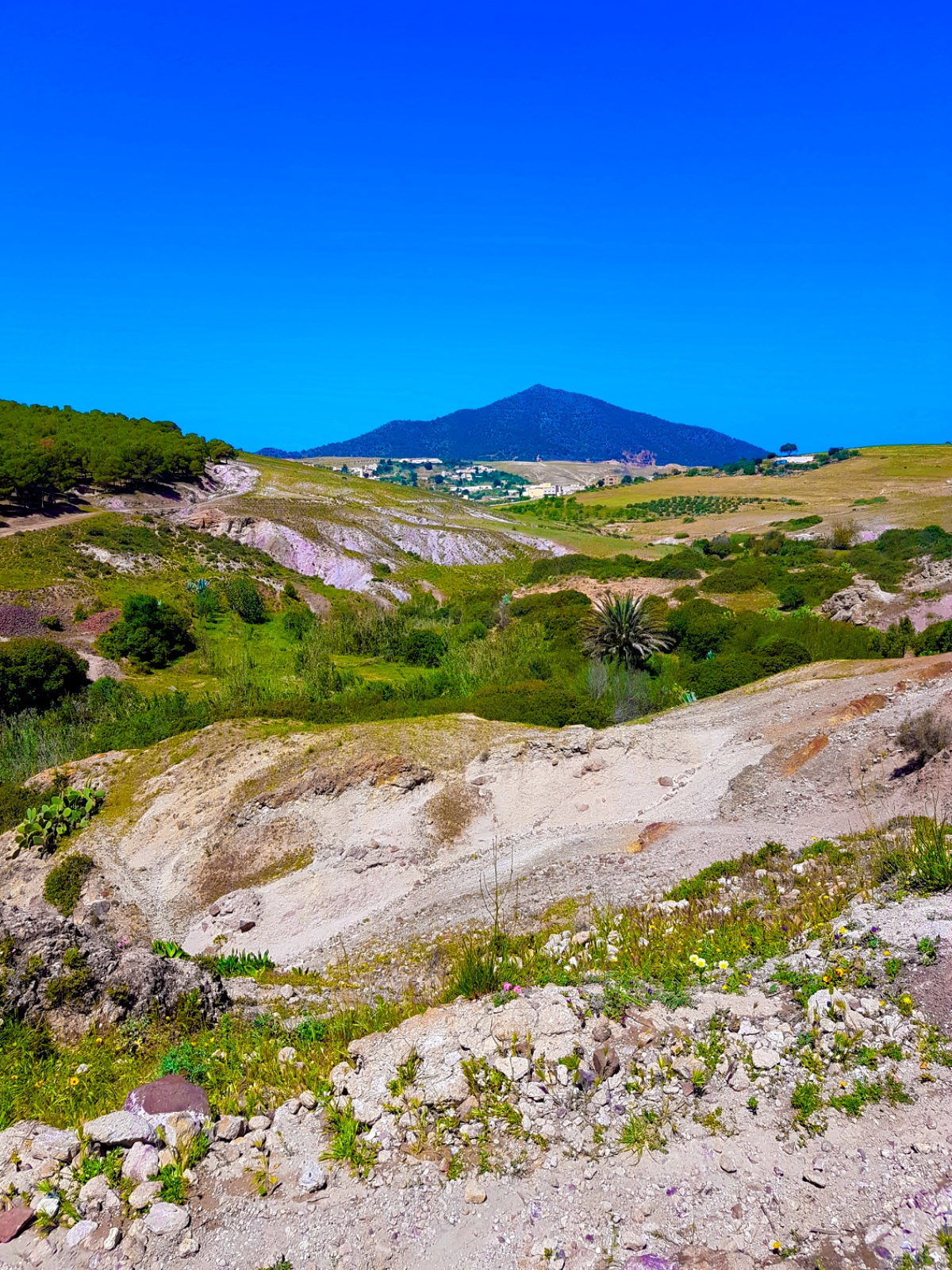

- Location within Morocco
- Coordinates: 35°8′21″N 3°7′41″W
- Country: Morocco
- Region: Oriental
- Province: Nador
- Time zone: UTC+0 (GMT)

Beni Sidel (Note: Also known as Beni Sedal and Beni Sedan. Tarifit: Ayt Sider) is a village and tribal group in the Rif mountain range in northern Morocco. It is situated east of the city of Nador, the provincial capital. The tribal group encompasses Bni Sidel Jbel and Bni Sidel Louta.

== Name ==
The name combines 'Beni', a variant of Arabic Banu, commonly used in tribal names, and 'Sidel'. Mubarak Belkacem links the latter to the Amazigh personal names 'Segdal' and 'Seydal', which he interprets as meaning approximately 'guardian' or 'protector'.

== History and society ==
Beni Sidel is part of the area and Riffian tribal confederation known as the Guelaya. Historically, it was known as Al-Ga'da or Ahl al Ga'da.

In 1880 the tribe had the following groups as subdivisions:

- Beni Daguel
- Ahl el Tlet
- Addouicia
- Beni Feklan
- Oulad Iacine
- Djouaoua
- Oulad R’anen
- El Atianen
- El Roudia
- Oulad Amar ou Aïssa

== Notable people ==
- Ahmed Aboutaleb, Dutch-Moroccan politician, former mayor of Rotterdam
- Youssef Mokhtari, Moroccan footballer
- Mohamed El Jerroudi, Poet end Writer
- Najat El Hachmi, Philologist and Writer (Nadal Novel Award, Ramon LLull Novel Award, Sant Joan Narrative Award)
