= Mohamed V Dam =

Dam in Nador, Morocco

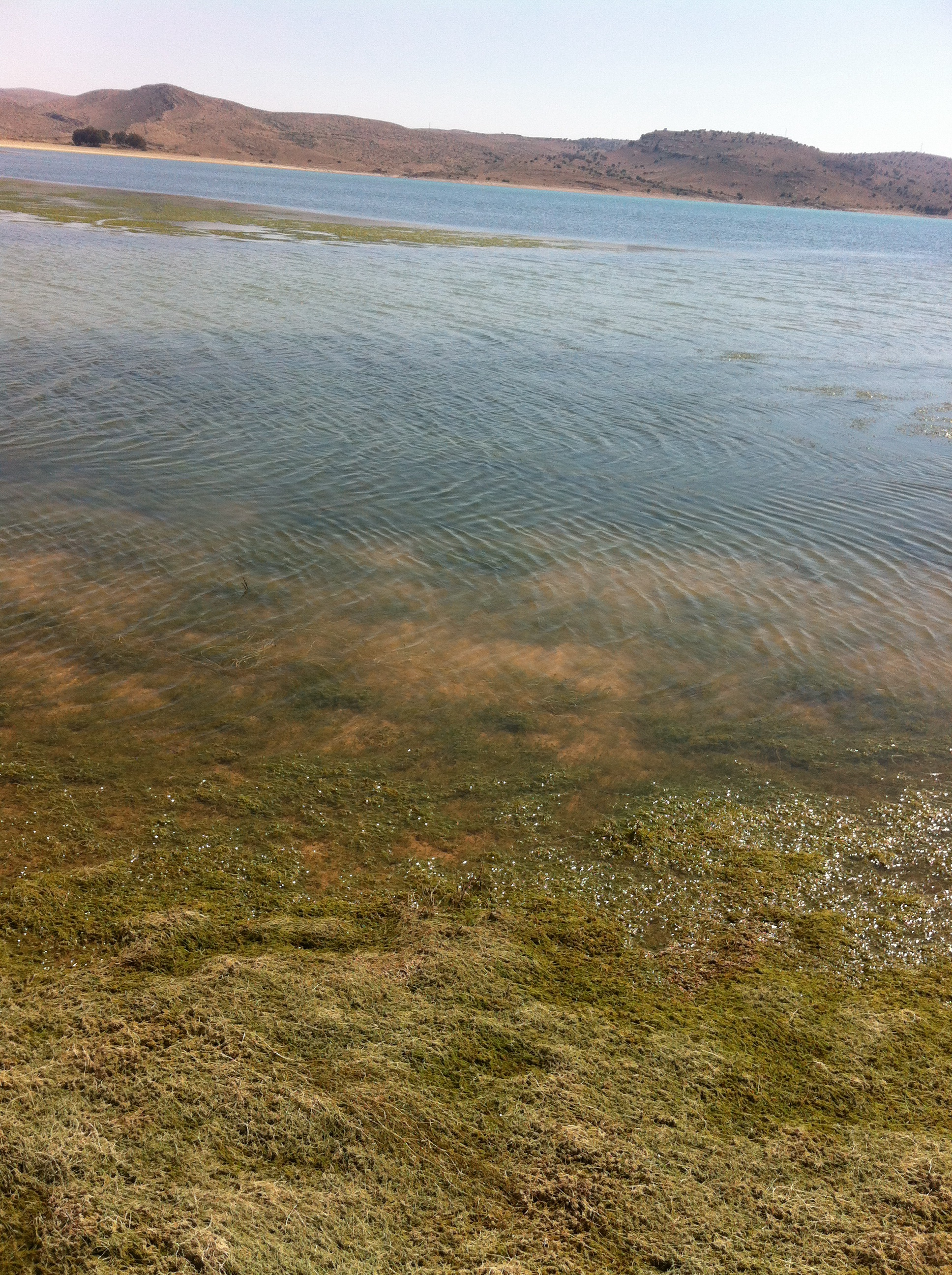
- Interactive map of Mohamed V Dam
- Official name: Barrage Mohamed V
- Country: Morocco
- Location: Hassi Berkane, Nador
- Coordinates: 34°39′47″N 02°56′18″W
- Status: Operational
- Opening date: 1967

Dam and spillways
- Type of dam: Arch-gravity
- Impounds: Moulouya River
- Height: 64 m (210 ft)
- Length: 280 m (920 ft)
- Dam volume: 250,000 m^{3} (8,800,000 cu ft)

Reservoir
- Total capacity: 730×10^{6} m^{3} (590,000 acre⋅ft)
- Active capacity: 690×10^{6} m^{3} (560,000 acre⋅ft)
- Catchment area: 49,920 km^{2} (19,270 sq mi)

Power Station
- Commission date: 1967
- Hydraulic head: 48 m (157 ft)
- Turbines: 1 x 23 MW (31,000 hp) Francis-type
- Installed capacity: 23 MW

Ramsar Wetland
- Official name: Barrage Mohammed V
- Designated: 15 January 2005
- Reference no.: 1472

The Mohamed V Dam is an arch-gravity dam located 35 kilometres (22 mi) south of Zaio on the Moulouya River in Nador Province, Morocco. The primary purpose of the dam is supplying water for the irrigation of 70,000 hectares (170,000 acres) downstream. Water is also used for hydroelectric power production and water supply to the city of Nador. The dam is named after Mohammed V of Morocco.

== Environment ==
The dam's reservoir and wetlands were designated as a Ramsar site in 2005. The site has also been designated an Important Bird Area (IBA) by BirdLife International because it supports significant breeding populations of ruddy shelducks and marbled teals.

== See also ==
- Al Massira Dam – another Ramsar site in Morocco
- List of power stations in Morocco
