= Spanish exonyms =

The following is a list of Spanish exonyms, Spanish names for places that do not speak Spanish that differ from the names used locally.

Some Spanish exonyms are traditional, and are in common use despite the existence of newer exonyms or current or native placenames (for example Pekín over Beijing). In other cases newer names and exonyms are preferred for political or social reasons, even when a place has an older Spanish exonym (for example Bangladés over Bengala).

== Algeria ==
Algeria Argelia
English name	Spanish name	Endonym		Notes
English name	Spanish name	Name	Language	Notes
Algiers	Argel	Al-Jazā'ir (الجزاٮُر)	Standard Arabic	
Annaba	Bona	Ubbo	Berber	
Annaba	Bona	Annaba (عنابة)	Standard Arabic	
Bejaïa	Bugía	Bgayeṯ	Berber	
Bejaïa	Bugía	Bijaya (بِجَايَة)	Standard Arabic	
Constantine	Constantina	Qusanṭīnah (قسنطينة)	Standard Arabic	
Honaine	Hunaín			
Mers El Kébir	Mazalquivir	Al-Marsā al-Kabīr (المرسى الكبير)	Standard Arabic	
Oran	Orán	وهران (Wahrān)	Standard Arabic	
Tlemcen	Tremecén	Tilimsān (تلمسان)	Standard Arabic	

== Andorra ==
Andorra
English name	Spanish name	Endonym	Notes
English name	Spanish name	Name	Notes
Andorra la Vella	Andorra la Vieja	Andorra la Vella	
Les Escaldes	Las Escaldas, Andorra la Nueva	Les Escaldes	
Sant Julià de Lòria	San Julián de Loria	Sant Julià de Lòria	

== Armenia ==
Armenia Armenia
English name	Spanish name	Endonym		Notes
English name	Spanish name	Name	Language	Notes

== Australia ==
Australia
English name	Spanish name	Endonym	Notes
Adelaide	Adelaida	Adelaide	
Sydney	Sídney	Sydney	

== Austria ==
Austria
English name	Spanish name	Endonym	Notes
Carinthia	Carintia	Kärnten	
Styria	Estiria	Steiermark	
Vienna	Viena	Wien	

== Azerbaijan ==
Azerbaijan Azerbaiyán
English name	Spanish name	Endonym		Notes
English name	Spanish name	Name	Language	Notes
Nakhchivan	Najicheván	Naxçıvan	Azerbaijani	

== Belgium ==
Belgium Bélgica
English name	Spanish name	Endonym		Notes
English name	Spanish name	Name	Language	Notes
Aalst	Alost	Aalst	Dutch	
Antwerp	Amberes	Antwerpen	Dutch	
Bruges	Brujas	Brugge	Dutch	
Brussels	Bruselas	Bruxelles	French	
Flanders	Flandes	Vlaanderen	Dutch	
Ghent	Gante	Gent	Dutch	
Hainaut	Henao	Hainaut	French	
Leuven	Lovaina	Leuven	Dutch	
Liège	Lieja	Lidje	Walloon	
Liège	Lieja	Liège	French	
Mechelen	Malinas	Mechelen	Dutch	
Sint-Niklaas	San Nicolás de Flandes	Sint-Niklaas	Dutch	Rare
Wallonia	Valonia	Wallonie	French	

== Brazil ==
Brazil Brasil
English name	Spanish name	Endonym	Notes
Maranhão	Marañón	Maranhão	
São Paulo	San Pablo	São Paulo	Historically used in Argentina, Paraguay and Uruguay only.

== Canada ==
Canada Canadá
English name	Spanish name	Endonym		Notes
English name	Spanish name	Name	Language	Notes
Newfoundland	Terranova	Newfoundland	English	
Newfoundland	Terranova	Terre-Neuve	French	
Yukon	Yucón, Yukón	Yukon	English, French	

== China ==
China
English name	Spanish name	Endonym		Notes
English name	Spanish name	Name	Language	Notes
Beijing	Pekín	Beijing (北京)	Mandarin	
Guangzhou	Cantón	Guangzhou (广州)	Mandarin	
Nanjing	Nankín	Nanjing (南京)	Mandarin	
Sichuan	Sechuán	Sichuan (四川)	Mandarin	

== Croatia ==
Croatia Croacia
English name	Spanish name	Endonym		Notes
English name	Spanish name	Name	Language	Notes
Dubrovnik	Ragusa	Dubrovnik	Croatian	Rare
Korčula	Curzola	Korčula	Croatian	Rare
Split	Espalato	Split	Croatian	Rare

== Cyprus ==
Cyprus Chipre
English name	Spanish name	Endonym		Notes
English name	Spanish name	Name	Language	Notes

== Czech Republic ==
Czech Republic Chequia
English name	Spanish name	Endonym	Notes
Plzeň, Pilsen	Pilsen	Plzeň	

== Denmark ==
Denmark Dinamarca
English name	Spanish name	Endonym	Notes
Copenhagen	Copenhague	København	
Funen	Fionia	Fyn	
Jutland	Jutlandia	Jylland	
Lolland	Lolandia	Lolland	
Zealand	Selandia	Sjælland	

== Egypt ==
Egypt Egipto
English name	Spanish name	Endonym		Notes
English name	Spanish name	Name	Language	Notes
Alexandria	Alejandría	Alexandria (ⲁⲗⲉⲝⲁⲛⲇⲣⲓⲁ)	Coptic	
Alexandria	Alejandría	Al-Iskandariyya (الإسكندرية)	Standard Arabic	
Alexandria	Alejandría	Eskendereyya (اسكندرية)	Egyptian Arabic	
Alexandria	Alejandría	Rakote (ⲣⲁⲕⲟϯ)	Coptic	
Cairo	El Cairo	Al-Qāhirah (القاهرة)	Standard Arabic	
Cairo	El Cairo	Maṣr (مَصر)	Egyptian Arabic	
Cairo	El Cairo	Tikešrōmi (ϯⲕⲉϣⲣⲱⲙⲓ)	Coptic	

== Estonia ==
Estonia
English name	Spanish name	Endonym	Notes

== Finland ==
Finland Finlandia
English name	Spanish name	Endonym		Notes
English name	Spanish name	Name	Language	Notes
Häme	Tavastia	Häme	Finnish	
Häme	Tavastia	Tavastland	Swedish	
Karelia	Carelia	Karjala	Finnish	
Karelia	Carelia	Karelen	Swedish	
Lapland	Laponia	Lappi	Finnish	
Lapland	Laponia	Lappland	Swedish	
Ostrobothnia	Ostrobotnia	Pohjanmaa	Finnish	
Ostrobothnia	Ostrobotnia	Österbotten	Swedish	
Savo	Savonia	Savo	Finnish	
Savo	Savonia	Savolax	Swedish	

== France ==
France Francia
English name	Spanish name	Endonym		Notes
English name	Spanish name	Name	Language	Notes
Alsace	Alsacia	Alsace	French	
Alsace	Alsacia	Elsass	German	
Alsace	Alsacia	Elsàss	Alemannic German	
Angoulême	Angulema	Angoulême	French	
Angoulême	Angulema	Engoleime	Poitevin-Saintongeais	
Angoulême	Angulema	Engoulaeme	Occitan	
Auvergne	Auvernia	Auvergne	French	
Auvergne	Auvernia	Auvèrnhe	Occitan	
Berdoues	Berdona	Berdoas	Occitan	
Berdoues	Berdona	Berdoues	French	
Bordeaux	Burdeos	Bordeaux	French	
Bordeaux	Burdeos	Bordèu	Occitan	
Burgundy	Borgoña	Bourgogne	French	
Clairvaux	Claraval	Clairvaux	French	
Collioure	Colibre	Collioure	French	
Collioure	Colibre	Cotlliure	Catalan	
Cornouaille	Cornualles	Kernev	Breton	
Cornouaille	Cornualles	Cornouaille	French	
Corsica	Córcega	Corse	French	
Corsica	Córcega	Corsica	Italian	
Dauphiné	Delfinado	Dauphiné	French	
Dauphiné	Delfinado	Daufinat	Occitan	
Franche-Comté	Franco Condado	Fraintche-Comté	Frainc-Comtou	
Franche-Comté	Franco Condado	Franche-Comtât	Arpitan	
Franche-Comté	Franco Condado	Franche-Comté	French	
Gascony	Gascuña	Gasconha	Occitan	
Gascony	Gascuña	Gaskoinia	Basque	
Gascony	Gascuña	Gascogne	French	
Grande Chartreuse	Gran Cartuja	Grande Chartreuse	French	
Iholdy	Yoldi	Iholdi	Basque	
Iholdy	Yoldi	Iholdy	French	
La Bastide-Clairence	Labastida Clarenza	Bastida Arberoa	Basque	
La Bastide-Clairence	Labastida Clarenza	La Bastide-Clairence	French	
Labourd	Labort	Lapurdi	Basque	
Labourd	Labort	Labourd	French	
Landes	Landas	Landes	French	
Languedoc	Lenguadoc	Languedoc	French	
Languedoc	Lenguadoc	Lengadòc	Occitan	
La Rochelle	La Rochela	La Rochelle	French	
Lille	Lila	Lile	Picard	
Lille	Lila	Lille	French	
Lille	Lila	Rijsel/ Rysel	Dutch	
Lorraine	Lorena	Lorraine	French	
Lorraine	Lorena	Louréne	Lorrain	
Lorraine	Lorena	Lothringen	German	
Lorraine	Lorena	Lottringe	West Franconian	
Lourdes	Lurdes	Lorda	Occitan	
Lourdes	Lurdes	Lourde	French	
Lower Navarre	Baja Navarra	Nafarroa Beherea	Basque	
Lower Navarre	Baja Navarra	Basse-Navarre	French	
Lyon	Léon de Francia	Liyon	Arpitan	
Lyon	Léon de Francia	Lyon	French	
Normandy	Normandía	Normandie	French	
Normandy	Normandía	Normaundie	Norman	
Oloron-Sainte-Marie	Santa María de Olorón	Auloron e Senta Maria	Occitan	
Oloron-Sainte-Marie	Santa María de Olorón	Oloron-Sainte-Marie	French	
Orléanais	Orleanesado	Orléanais	French	
Picardy	Picardía	Picardie	French/ Picard	
Poitiers	Piteos	Poitiers	French	
Poitiers	Piteos	Potchiers	Poitevin	
Provence	Provenza	Prouvenço	Occitan	
Provence	Provenza	Provence	French	
Pyrénées	Pirineos	Pirenèus	Occitan	
Pyrénées	Pirineos	Pirinioak	Basque	
Pyrénées	Pirineos	Pyrénées	French	Area also part of Spain
Rhône	Ródano	Rhône	French	
Rhône	Ródano	Rôno	Arpitan	
Rhône	Ródano	Ròse	Occitan	
Rouen	Ruán	Rouen	French	
Sainte-Engrâce	Santa Engracia	Urdatx	Basque	
Sainte-Engrâce	Santa Engracia	Sainte-Engrâce	French	
Saint-Jean-de-Luz	San Juan de Luz	Donibane Lohizune	Basque	
Saint-Jean-de-Luz	San Juan de Luz	Saint Jean-de-Luz	French	
Saint-Jean-le-Vieux	San Juan el Viejo	Donibane Zaharra	Basque	
Saint-Jean-le-Vieux	San Juan el Viejo	Saint-Jean-le-Vieux	French	
Saint-Jean-Pied-de-Port	San Juan Pie de Puerto	Donibane Garazi	Basque	
Saint-Jean-Pied-de-Port	San Juan Pie de Puerto	Saint-Jean-Pied-de-Port	French	
Sauveterre-de-Béarn	Salvatierra de Bearne	Sauvatèrra	Occitan	
Sauveterre-de-Béarn	Salvatierra de Bearne	Sauveterre-de-Béarn	French	
Savoy	Saboya	Savoie	French	
Savoy	Saboya	Savouè	Arpitan	
Soule	Sola	Zuberoa	Basque	
Soule	Sola	Soule	French	
Tardets-Sorholus	Tardés	Atharratze-Sorholüze	Basque	
Tardets-Sorholus	Tardés	Tardets-Sorholus	French	
Toulouse	Tolosa	Toulouse	French	
Toulouse	Tolosa	Toulouso	Occitan	
Touraine	Turena	Touraine	French	
Valence	Valencia de Francia	Valença	Occitan	Obsolete
Valence	Valencia de Francia	Valence	French	
Valenciennes	Valenciana	Valenciennes	French	Obsolete
Valenciennes	Valenciana	Valincyinne	Picard	
Vendée	Vandea	Vendée	French	
Versailles	Versalles	Versailles	French	

== Georgia ==
Georgia
English name	Spanish name	Georgian place	Notes
Tbilisi	Tiflis	Tbilisi (თბილისი)	

== Germany ==
Germany Alemania
English name	Spanish name	Endonym		Notes
English name	Spanish name	Name	Language	Notes
Aachen	Aquisgrán	Aachen	Standard German	
Aachen	Aquisgrán	Oche	Colognian German	
Allgäu	Algovia	Allgäu	Standard German	
Altenburg	Altemburgo	Altenburg	Standard German	
Aschaffenburg	Aschaffemburgo	Aschebersch	Hessian	
Aschaffenburg	Aschaffemburgo	Aschaffenburg	Standard German	
Bavaria	Baviera	Bayern	Standard German	
Bonn	Bona	Bonn	Standard German	Obsolete
Brandenburg	Brandeburgo	Bramborska	Lower Sorbian	
Brandenburg	Brandeburgo	Brandenburg	Standard German	
Brandenburg	Brandeburgo	Braniborsko	Upper Sorbian	
Brandenburg	Brandeburgo	Brannenborg	Low German	
Braunschweig	Brunswick	Braunschweig	Standard German	
Braunschweig	Brunswick	Brunswiek	Low German	
Bremen	Brema	Bräm, Breem	Low German	Obsolete
Bremen	Brema	Bremen	Standard German	
Cologne	Colonia	Kölle	Colognian German	
Cologne	Colonia	Köln	Standard German	
Donauwörth	Donaverte	Donawerd	Swabian	Obsolete
Donauwörth	Donaverte	Donauwörth	Standard German	
Dresden	Dresde	Dresden	Standard German	
Dresden	Dresde	Drježdźany	Sorbian languages	
Franconia	Franconia	Franggn, Frankn	Alemannic German	
Franconia	Franconia	Franken	Standard German	
Freiburg im Breisgau	Friburgo de Brisgovia	Freiburg im Breisgau	Standard German	
Freiburg im Breisgau	Friburgo de Brisgovia	Friburg im Brisgau	Alemannic German	
Freising	Frisinga	Freising	Standard German	
Geldern	Güeldres	Geldern	Standard German	Obsolete
Göttingen	Gotinga	Chöttingen	Low German	
Göttingen	Gotinga	Göttingen	Standard German	
Hamelin	Hamelín	Hameln	Standard German	
Hesse	Hesse	Hessen	Standard German	
Kleve	Cléveris	Kleff	Kleverlandish	
Kleve	Cléveris	Kleve	Standard German	
Leipzig	Lipsia	Lipsk	Upper Sorbian	Obsolete
Leipzig	Lipsia	Leipzig	Standard German	
Ludwigsburg	Luisburgo	Ludwigsburg	Standard German	Rare
Mainz	Maguncia	Mainz	Standard German	
Munich	Múnich	Minga	Bavarian	
Munich	Múnich	München	Standard German	
Münster	Muñiste	Münster	Standard German	Obsolete
Naumburg	Naumburgo	Naumburg	Standard German	
Nördlingen	Norlinga	Nearle	Swabian	Obsolete
Nördlingen	Norlinga	Nördlingen	Standard German	
Nuremberg	Núremberg	Närmberch	East Franconian	
Nuremberg	Núremberg	Niamberg	Bavarian	
Nuremberg	Núremberg	Nürnberg	Standard German	
Palatinate	Palatinado	Palz	West Franconian	
Palatinate	Palatinado	Pfalz	Standard German	
Regensburg	Ratisbona	Regensburg	Standard German	
Rhineland	Renania	Rheinland	Standard German	
Rotenburg an der Wümme	Rotemburgo del Wümme	Rodenborg	Low German	
Rotenburg an der Wümme	Rotemburgo del Wümme	Rotenburg an der Wümme	Standard German	
Saarland	Sarre	Saarland	Standard German	
Saxony	Sajonia	Sachsen	High German	
Saxony	Sajonia	Sassen	Low German	
Schleswig	Eslésvica	Sljasvig	Jutlandic	
Schleswig	Eslésvica	Slesvig	Danish	Obsolete
Schleswig	Eslésvica	Sleswig	Low German	
Schleswig	Eslésvica	Schleswig	Standard German	
Sigmaringen	Sigmaringa	Semmerenga	Swabian	
Sigmaringen	Sigmaringa	Sigmaringen	Standard German	
Speyer	Espira	Speyer	Standard German	
Stuttgart	Estugardia	Stuttgart	Standard German	Obsolete
Swabia	Suabia	Schwaben	Standard German	
Thuringia	Turingia	Thüringen	Standard German	
Trier	Tréveris	Tréier	Luxembourgish	
Trier	Tréveris	Trier	Standard German	
Tübingen	Tubinga	Dibenga	Swabian	
Tübingen	Tubinga	Tübingen	Standard German	
Westphalia	Westfalia	Westfalen	Standard German	
Xanten	Santos	Santen	Low Rhenish	
Xanten	Santos	Xanten	Standard German	

== Greece ==
Greece Grecia
English name	Spanish name	Endonym	Notes
Alexandrupoli	Alejandrópolis	Alexandroúpoli (Αλεξανδρούπολη)	
Athens	Atenas	Athína (Αθήνα)	
Attica	Ática	Attikí (Αττική)	
Boeotia	Beocia	Boiōtíā (Βοιωτία)	
Cephalonia	Cefalonia	Kefaloniá (Κεφαλονιά)	
Corfu	Corfú	Kérkyra (Κέρκυρα)	
Corinth	Corinto	Kórinthos (Κόρινθος)	
Crete	Creta	Kríti (Κρήτη)	
Dodecanese	Dodecaneso	Dodekánisa (Δωδεκάνησα)	
Epirus	Épiro	Ípeiros (Ήπειρος)	
Euboea	Eubea	Évvoia (Εύβοια)	
Heraklion	Heraclión	Irákleio (Ηράκλειο)	
Ionian Islands	Ítaca	Itháki (Ιθάκη)	
Ithaca	Islas Jónicas	Iónia nisiá (Ιόνια νησιά)	
Kythira	Citera	Kýthira (Κύθηρα)	
Lefkada	Léucade	Lefkáda (Λευκάδα)	
Nafpaktos	Naupacto	Naúpactus (Ναύπακτος)	
Patras	Patrás	Pátra (Πάτρα)	
Peloponnese	Peloponeso	Pelopónnesos (Πελοπόννησος)	
Piraeus	El Pireo	Peiraiás (Πειραιάς)	
Rhodes	Rodas	Ródos (Ρόδος)	
Samothrace	Samotracia	Samothráki (Σαμοθράκη)	
Sparta	Esparta	Spárti (Σπάρτη)	
Thebes	Tebas	Thíva (Θήβα)	
Thessaloniki	Salónica	Thessaloníki (Θεσσαλονίκη)	
Thrace	Tracia	Thráki (Θράκη)	
Zakynthos	Zacinto	Zakynthos (Ζάκυνθος)	

== Haiti ==
Haiti Haití
English name	Spanish name	Endonym	Notes
Abricots	Los Albaricoques	Les Abricots	
La Victoire	La Victoria	La Victoire	
Les Cayes	Los Cayos	Les Cayes	
Limonade	Limonada	Limonade	
Marmelade	Mermelada	Marmelade	
Ouanaminthe	Juana Méndez	Ouanaminthe	
Saint-Michel-de-l'Atalaye	San Miguel de la Atalaya	Saint-Michel-de-l'Atalaye	
Saint-Raphaël	San Rafael de la Angostura	Saint-Raphaël	

== Hungary ==
Hungary Hungría
English name	Spanish name	Endonym	Notes
Esztergom	Estrigonia	Esztergom	
Székesfehérvár	Alba Regia	Székesfehérvár	
Szombathely	Savaria	Szombathely	Obsolete

== India ==
India
English name	Spanish name	Endonym	Notes
Kolkata	Calcuta	কলকাতা (Kalakātā); Kolkata	Formerly known as Calcutta in English
New Delhi	Nueva Delhi	नई दिल्ली (Naī Dillī)	

== Israel ==
Israel
English name	Spanish name	Endonym		Notes
English name	Spanish name	Name	Language	Notes
Acre	Acre	Akka (عكّا)	Standard Arabic	
Acre	Acre	Akko (עַכּוֹ)	Hebrew	
Ashkelon	Ascalón	Ashkelon (אַשְׁקְלוֹן)	Hebrew	
Ashkelon	Ascalón	Asqalān (عَسْقَلَان)	Standard Arabic	
Beersheba	Beerseba	Be'er Sheva (בְּאֵר שֶׁבַע)	Hebrew	
Beersheba	Beerseba	Bi'r as-Sab' (بئر السبع)	Standard Arabic	
Galilee	Galilea	Al-Jalīl (الجليل)	Standard Arabic	
Galilee	Galilea	HaGalil (הַגָּלִיל)	Hebrew	
Jaffa	Jaffa	Yafa (يَافَا)	Standard Arabic	
Jaffa	Jaffa	Yafo (יָפוֹ)	Hebrew	
Jerusalem	Jerusalén	Al-Quds (القُدس)	Standard Arabic	
Jerusalem	Jerusalén	Yerushalayim (יְרוּשָׁלַיִם)	Hebrew	
Nazareth	Nazaret	An-Nāṣira (النَّاصِرَة)	Standard Arabic	
Nazareth	Nazaret	Naṣrath (ܢܨܪܬ)	Aramaic	
Nazareth	Nazaret	Natzrat (נָצְרַת)	Hebrew	
Tiberias	Tiberíades	Ṭabariyyā (طبريا)	Standard Arabic	
Tiberias	Tiberíades	Tverya (טְבֶרְיָה)	Hebrew	

== Italy ==
Italy Italia
English name	Spanish name	Endonym		Notes
English name	Spanish name	Name	Language	Notes
Abruzzo	Abruzos	Abrùzze	Neapolitan	
Abruzzo	Abruzos	Abruzzo	Standard Italian	
Adige	Adigio	Àdexe	Venetian	
Adige	Adigio	Adige	Standard Italian	
Adige	Adigio	Etsch	German	
Apulia	Apulia	’a Pugghia	Neapolitan	
Apulia	Apulia	Puglia	Standard Italian	
Apulia	Apulia	Pulja	Arbëresh	
Assisi	Asís	Assisi	Standard Italian	
Bologna	Bolonia	Bologna	Standard Italian	
Bologna	Bolonia	Bulåggna	Emilian	
Cagliari	Cáller	Casteddu	Sardinian	Rare
Cagliari	Cáller	Cagliari	Standard Italian	
Florence	Florencia	Firenze	Standard Italian	
Friuli	Friules	Friûl	Friulian	
Friuli	Friules	Friuli	Standard Italian	
Livorno	Liorna	Livorno	Standard Italian	Obsolete
Naples	Nápoles	Napoli	Standard Italian	
Naples	Nápoles	Napule	Neapolitan	
Oristano	Oristán	Aristanis	Sardinian	
Oristano	Oristán	Oristano	Standard Italian	
Padua	Padua	Padova	Standard Italian	
Padua	Padua	Pàdova	Venetian	
Perugia	Perusa	Perugia	Standard Italian	
Piacenza	Plasencia	Piaṡëinsa	Emilian	Obsolete
Piacenza	Plasencia	Piacenza	Standard Italian	
Piedmont	Piamonte	Piemont	Arpitan/ Piedmontese	
Piedmont	Piamonte	Piemonte	Standard Italian	
Reggio Calabria	Regio de Calabria	Riggiu	Calabrian	
Reggio Calabria	Regio de Calabria	Reggio Calabria	Standard Italian	
Reggio Calabria	Regio de Calabria	Rìji	Calabrian Greek	
Sardinia	Cerdeña	Saldigna	Gallurese	
Sardinia	Cerdeña	Sardegna	Ligurian/ Standard Italian	
Sardinia	Cerdeña	Sardenya	Catalan	
Sardinia	Cerdeña	Sardhigna	Sassarese	
Sardinia	Cerdeña	Sardigna	Sardinian	
Sassari	Sácer	Sàssari	Sassarese	
Sassari	Sácer	Sassari	Standard Italian	
Sassari	Sácer	Tàtari	Sardinian	
Taranto	Tarento	Tarde	Neapolitan	
Taranto	Tarento	Taranto	Standard Italian	
The Marches	Las Marcas	Marche	Standard Italian	

== Latvia ==
Latvia Letonia
English name	Spanish name	Endonym	Notes
Courland	Curlandia	Kurzeme	
Latgale	Letgalia	Latgale	
Selonia	Selonia	Sēlija	
Semigallia	Semigalia	Zemgale	
Vidzeme	Vidlandia	Vidzeme	

== Lebanon ==
Lebanon Líbano
English name	Spanish name	Endonym		Notes
English name	Spanish name	Name	Language	Notes
Byblos	Biblos	Jubayl (جُبَيْل)	Standard Arabic	
Sidon	Sidón	Ṣayda (صيدا)	Standard Arabic	
Tripoli	Trípoli	Ṭarābulus (طرابلس)	Standard Arabic	
Tyre	Tiro	Ṣūr (صور)	Standard Arabic	

== Libya ==
Libya Libia
English name	Spanish name	Endonym		Notes
English name	Spanish name	Name	Language	Notes
Tripoli	Trípoli	Ṭarābulus (طرابلس)	Standard Arabic	

== Lithuania ==
Lithuania Lituania
English name	Spanish name	Lithuanian place	Notes
Vilnius	Vilna	Vilnius	

== Morocco ==
Morocco Marruecos
English name	Spanish name	Endonym		Notes
English name	Spanish name	Name	Language	Notes
Agadir	Santa Cruz del Cabo Aguer	ʾagādīr (أݣادير)	Standard Arabic	Obsolete
Al Aaroui	Monte Arruit	Al-ʿArwī (العروي)	Standard Arabic	
Al Hoceima	Alhucemas	Al-Kuzāmā (الحسيمة)	Standard Arabic	
Asilah	Arcila	Aẓila (أصيلة or أزيلا)	Standard Arabic	
Azemmour	Azamor	Azammūr (أزمور)	Standard Arabic	
Berkane	Berkán	Birkān (بركان)	Standard Arabic	
Bouarfa	Buarfa	Bou 'rfa (بوعرفة)	Standard Arabic	
Chefchaouen	Chauen (Xauen)	Shafshāwan (شفشاون)	Standard Arabic	Spelling Xauen is archaic in Spanish
El Jebha	Puerto Capaz			Name used during Spanish colonial rule
El Jadida	El Yadida, Mazagán	Al-Jadīda (الجديدة)	Standard Arabic	
Essaouira	Esauira, Mogador	Aṣ-Ṣawīra (الصويرة)	Standard Arabic	
Fez	Fez	Fās (فاس)	Standard Arabic	
Fnideq	Castillejos	Fnideq (الفنيدق)	Standard Arabic	
Guelmim	Egleimín	Gulmīm (كلميم)	Standard Arabic	
Iksane	Uixán	Iksān (إيكسان)	Standard Arabic	
Khemis Sahel	Jemis del Sahel	H̱amīs shl (خميس الساحل)	Standard Arabic	
Ksar El-Kebir	Alcazarquivir	Qaṣr Kabīr (القصر الكبير)	Standard Arabic	
Ksar Es-Seghir	Alcazarseguir	Al-Qaṣr Aṣ-Saḡīr (القصر الصغير)	Standard Arabic	
M'Diq	Rincón	Maḍīq (المضيق)	Standard Arabic	
Marrakesh	Marruecos	Murrākuš (مراكش)	Standard Arabic	Obsolete
Martil	Río Martín	Martīl (مارتيل)	Standard Arabic	
Mehdya	Mehdía, La Mamora	Al-Mahdiyā (المهدية)	Standard Arabic	
Meknes	Mequínez	Maknās (مكناس)	Standard Arabic	
Sidi Ifni	Santa Cruz de Mar Pequeña	Sidi Ifni (سيدي إفني)	Standard Arabic	
Sefrou	Sefrú	Şafrū (صفرو)	Standard Arabic	
Selouane	Zeluán	Salwān (سلوان)	Standard Arabic	
Tangier	Tánger	Ṭanja (طنجة)	Standard Arabic	
Tarfaya	Villa Bens	Ṭarfāya (طرفاية)	Standard Arabic	Name used during Spanish colonial rule
Taounate	Taunat	Taunate (تاونات)	Standard Arabic	
Temsamane	Tensamán, Tansamán	Tamsamān (تمسمان)	Standard Arabic	
Tétouan	Tetuán	Tiṭwān (تطوان)	Standard Arabic	
Ouazzane	Uezán	Wazzan (وزان)	Standard Arabic	
Oujda	Uchda, Uxda	Wujda (وجدة)	Standard Arabic	

== Netherlands ==
Netherlands Países Bajos
English name	Spanish name	Endonym	Notes
Friesland	Frisia	Fryslân	
Friesland	Frisia	Friesland	
Gelderland	Güeldres	Gelderland	
Groningen	Groninga	Groningen	
Leeuwarden	Leuvarda	Leeuwarden	Rare
Leiden	Leida	Leiden	Rare
Roermond	Ruremunda	Roermond	Rare
's-Hertogenbosch	Bolduque	's-Hertogenbosch	
The Hague	La Haya	Det Haag	
Maastricht	Mastrique	Maastricht	Rare
Nijmegen	Nimega	Nijmegen	
North Brabant	Brabante Septentrional	Noord-Brabant	
North Holland	Holanda Septentrional	Noord-Holland	
Overijssel	Transisalania	Overijssel	Obsolete
Sluis	La Esclusa	Sluis	
Utrecht	Utreque	Utrecht	Obsolete
Vlissingen	Flesinga	Vlissingen	

== Poland ==
Poland Polonia
English name	Spanish name	Endonym	Notes
Elbląg	Elbingue	Elbląg	Obsolete
Gdynia	Gedania	Gdynia	Obsolete
Kraków	Cracovia	Kraków	
Oświęcim	Osvecimia	Oświęcim	Obsolete
Poznań	Posnania	Poznań	Rare
Rzeszów	Resovia	Rzeszów	Obsolete
Sandomierz	Sandomir	Sandomierz	Obsolete
Słupsk	Stolpa	Słupsk	Obsolete
Świętokrzyskie Province	Provincia de Santa Cruz	Świętokrzyskie Province	
Warsaw	Varsovia	Warszawa	
Wrocław	Breslavia	Wrocław	

== Portugal ==
Portugal
English name	Spanish name	Endonym	Notes
Cascais	Cascaes	Cascais	
Covilhã	Covillana	Colvilha	
Elvas	Yelbes	Elvas	Obsolete
Évora	Ébora	Évora	
Guimarães	Guimaranes	Guimarães	Obsolete
Marvão	Marvón	Marvão	Obsolete
Monção	Monzón	Monção	
Porto	Oporto	Porto	
Ponte de Lima	Puente de Limia	Ponte de Lima	
Sacavém	Sacaven	Sacavém	Obsolete
Santarém	Santarén	Santarém	
Sintra	Cintra	Sintra	
Valença	Valencia de Miño	Valença do Minho	
Vila Franca de Xira	Villafranca de Jira	Vila Franca de Xira	
Vila Viçosa	Villaviciosa	Vila Viçosa	
Viseu	Viseo, Vicedo	Viseu	Obsolete

== Romania ==
Romania Rumanía
English name	Spanish name	Endonym		Notes
English name	Spanish name	Name	Language	Notes
Bucharest	Bucarest	București	Romanian	

== Russia ==
Russia Rusia
English name	Spanish name	Endonym		Notes
English name	Spanish name	Name	Language	Notes
Arkhangelsk	Arcángel	Arkhangelsk (Архангельск)	Russian	
Moscow	Moscú	Moskva (Москва)	Russian	
Saint Petersburg	San Petersburgo	Sankt Peterburg (Санкт-Петербург)	Russian	
Tatarstan	Tartaria	Tatarstan (Татарстан)	Russian/ Tatar	Tataria is archaic in Spanish
Volgograd	Volgogrado	Volgograd (Волгоград)	Russian	

== Serbia ==
Serbia
English name	Spanish name	Endonym	Notes
Belgrade	Belgrado	Beograd (Београд)	

== Spain ==
Spain España
English name	Spanish name	Endonym		Notes
English name	Spanish name	Name	Language	Notes
A Illa de Arousa	Isla de Arosa	A Illa de Arousa	Galician	
Alicante	Alicante	Alacant	Valencian	
Aller	Aller	Ayer	Asturian	
Asturias	Asturias	Asturies	Asturian	Less often, Asturies is also used in Spanish.
Basque Country	País Vasco	Euskadi	Basque	
Bilbao	Bilbao	Bilbo	Basque	
San Sebastián	San Sebastián	Donostia	Basque	
Elche	Elche	Elx	Valencian	
Galicia	Galicia	Galiza	Galician	Galiza is minoritarily used
Gijón	Gijón	Xixón	Asturian	
Girona	Gerona	Girona	Catalan	
Ibiza	Ibiza	Eivissa	Catalan	
Jaca	Jaca	Chaca	Aragonese	
La Seu d'Urgell	Seo de Urgel	La Seu d'Urgell	Catalan	
León	León	Llión	Leonese	
Lleida	Lérida	Lleida	Catalan	
Mahón	Mahón	Maó	Catalan	
Navarre	Navarra	Nafarroa	Basque	
Ontinyent	Onteniente	Ontinyent	Valencian	
Oviedo	Oviedo	Uviéu	Asturian	Although the official form is Uviéu, the more commonly used term locally is Uvieo
Pamplona	Pamplona	Iruñ(e)a	Basque	Officially Iruña, Euskaltzaindia prefers the use of Iruñea
S'Espalmador	Isla de Espalmador	S'Espalmador	Catalan	
Vegadeo	Vegadeo	A Veiga	Galician-Asturian	
Viella	Viella	Vielha e Mijaran	Aranese	
Villablino	Villablino	Viḷḷablinu	Leonese	
Villarreal	Villarreal	Vila-real	Valencian	
Vitoria-Gasteiz	Vitoria	Gasteiz	Basque	
Xàbia	Jávea	Xàbia	Valencian	

== Sweden ==
Sweden Suecia
English name	Spanish name	Endonym	Notes
Dalarna, Dalecarlia	Dalecarlia	Dalarna	
Gothenburg	Gotemburgo	Göteborg	
Gotland	Gotlandia	Gotland	
Jämtland County	Provincia de Jemtia	Jämtlands län	
Lapland	Laponia	Lappland	
Norrbotten County	Provincia de Norbotnia	Norrbottens län	
Öland	Olandia	Öland	
Östergötland County	Provincia de Ostrogotia	Östergötlands län	
Scania	Escania	Skåne	
Södermanland County	Provincia de Sudermania	Södermanlands län	
Värmland County	Provincia de Vermelandia	Värmlands län	
Västerbotten County	Provincia de Vestrobotnia	Västerbottens län	
Västernorrland County	Provincia de Vestronorlandia	Västernorrlands län	
Västra Götaland County	Provincia de Gotia Occidental	Västra Götalands län	
Västmanland County	Provincia de Vestmania	Västmanlands län	

== Switzerland ==
Switzerland Suiza
English name	Spanish name	Endonym		Notes
English name	Spanish name	Name	Language	Notes
Aargau	Argovia	Aargau	German	
Basel	Basilea	Basel	German	
Chur	Coira	Cuira	Romansh	
Chur	Coira	Chur	German	
Geneva	Ginebra	Gèneve	French	
Geneva	Ginebra	Genf	German	
Glarus	Glaris	Glarus	German	
Grisons	Grisones	Graubünden	German	
Grisons	Grisones	Grischun	Romansh	
Grisons	Grisones	Grigioni	Italian	
Lausanne	Lausana	Lausanne	French	
Schaffhausen	Escafusa	Schaffhausen	German	Obsolete
Solothurn	Soleura	Solothurn	German	
Thurgau	Turgovia	Thurgau	German	
Ticino	Tesino	Ticino	Italian	

== Syria ==
Syria Siria
English name	Spanish name	Endonym		Notes
English name	Spanish name	Name	Language	Notes
Aleppo	Alepo	Ḥalab (ﺣَﻠَﺐ)	Standard Arabic	
Damascus	Damasco	Dimashq (دمشق)	Standard Arabic	

== Tunisia ==
Tunisia Túnez
English name	Spanish name	Endonym		Notes
English name	Spanish name	Name	Language	Notes
Bizerte	Bizerta	Binzart (بنزرت)	Standard Arabic	
Kairouan	Cairuán	Al-Qayrawān (ٱلْقَيْرَوَان)	Standard Arabic	
La Goulette	La Goleta	Halq al-Wadi (حلق الوادي)	Standard Arabic	

== Turkey ==
Turkey Turquía
English name	Spanish name	Endonym	Notes
Ankara	Angora	Ankara	
Antakya	Antioquía	Antakya	
Bosphorus	Bósforo	Boǧaziçi	
Büyük Menderes	Meandro	Büyük Menderes	
Cappadocia	Capadocia	Kapadokya	
Dardanelles	Dardanelos	Çanakkale Boǧazı	
Ephesus	Éfeso	Efes	
Euphrates	Éufrates	Fırat	
Gallipoli	Galípoli	Gelibolu	
Halicarnassus	Halicarnaso	Bodrum	
İskenderun	Alejandreta	İskenderun	
İzmir	Esmirna	İzmir	
Thrace	Tracia	Trakya	
Trabzon	Trebisonda	Trabzon	
Troy	Troya	Truva	

== Ukraine ==
Ukraine Ucrania
English name	Spanish name	Endonym	Notes
Chernihiv	Chernígov	Chernihiv (Черні́гів)	
Kharkiv	Járkov	Kharkhiv (Харків)	Translation "Járkiv" also used
Kryvyi Rih	Krivói Rog	Kryvyi Rih (Кривий Ріг)	
Kyiv	Kiev	Kyiv (Київ)	
Lviv	Léopolis	L'viv (Львів)	
Mykolaiv	Nicolaiev	Mykolaiv (Миколаїв)	
Sevastopol	Sebastopol	Sevastopol (Севасто́поль)	
Vinnytsia	Vínnitsa	Vinnytsia (Вінниця)	

== United Kingdom ==
United Kingdom Reino Unido
English name	Spanish name	Endonym		Notes
English name	Spanish name	Name	Language	Notes
Channel Islands	Islas Anglo-Normandas	Channel Islands	English	Also called translation Islas del Canal
Canterbury	Cantórbery	Canterbury	English	Archaic
Cambridge	Cambrigia	Cambridge	English	Archaic
Cornwall	Cornualles	Cornwall	English	
Cornwall	Cornualles	Kernow	Cornish	
Dover	Duvres	Dover	English	Archaic
England	Inglaterra	England	English	
Falkland Islands	Islas Malvinas	Falkland Islands	English	There are a lot of Spanish exonyms for places on the islands, see List of Falkland Islands placenames
Hebrides	Islas Hébridas	Innse Gall	Scottish Gaelic	
Hebrides	Islas Hébridas	Hebrides	English	
London	Londres	London	English	
Orkney	Islas Orcadas	Arcaibh	Scottish Gaelic	
Orkney	Islas Orcadas	Orkney	English	
Isles of Scilly	Islas Sorlingas	Isles of Scilly	English	
Isles of Scilly	Islas Sorlingas	Syllan	Cornish	
Scotland	Escocia	Alba	Scottish Gaelic	
Scotland	Escocia	Scotland	English	
Thames	Támesis	Thames	English	
Wales	Gales	Cymru	Welsh	
Wales	Gales	Wales	English	

== United States ==
United States Estados Unidos
English name	Spanish name	Endonym	Notes
Cape Canaveral	Cabo Cañaveral	Cape Canaveral	
Key West	Cayo Hueso	Key West	
Mobile, Alabama	Mauvila	Mobile	

== Uzbekistan ==
Uzbekistan Uzbekistán
English name	Spanish name	Endonym		Notes
English name	Spanish name	Name	Language	Notes
Bukhara	Bujará	Buxoro	Uzbek	
Tashkent	Taskent	Toshkent	Uzbek	

== See also ==
- List of European exonyms
