= Mohamed V =

Mohamed V may refer to:

- Al-Mu'tazz, sometimes referred to as Muhammad V, was the Abbasid caliph (from 866 to 869).
- Muhammed V of Granada (1338–1391), Sultan of Granada
- Mehmed V (1848–1918), 39th Sultan of the Ottoman Empire
- Mohammed V of Morocco (1909–1961), king of Morocco
  - Mohamed V Dam, located in Morocco and named after the above
  - Mohammed V University, located in Rabat
- Muhammad V of Delhi (died 1557)
- Muhammad V of Kelantan (born 1969), Sultan of Kelantan and 15th King of Malaysia
- Baba Mohammed ben-Osman (1710-1791), also known as Mohammed V, Dey of Algiers
