= Ahmed Aboutaleb =

Dutch politician (born 1961)

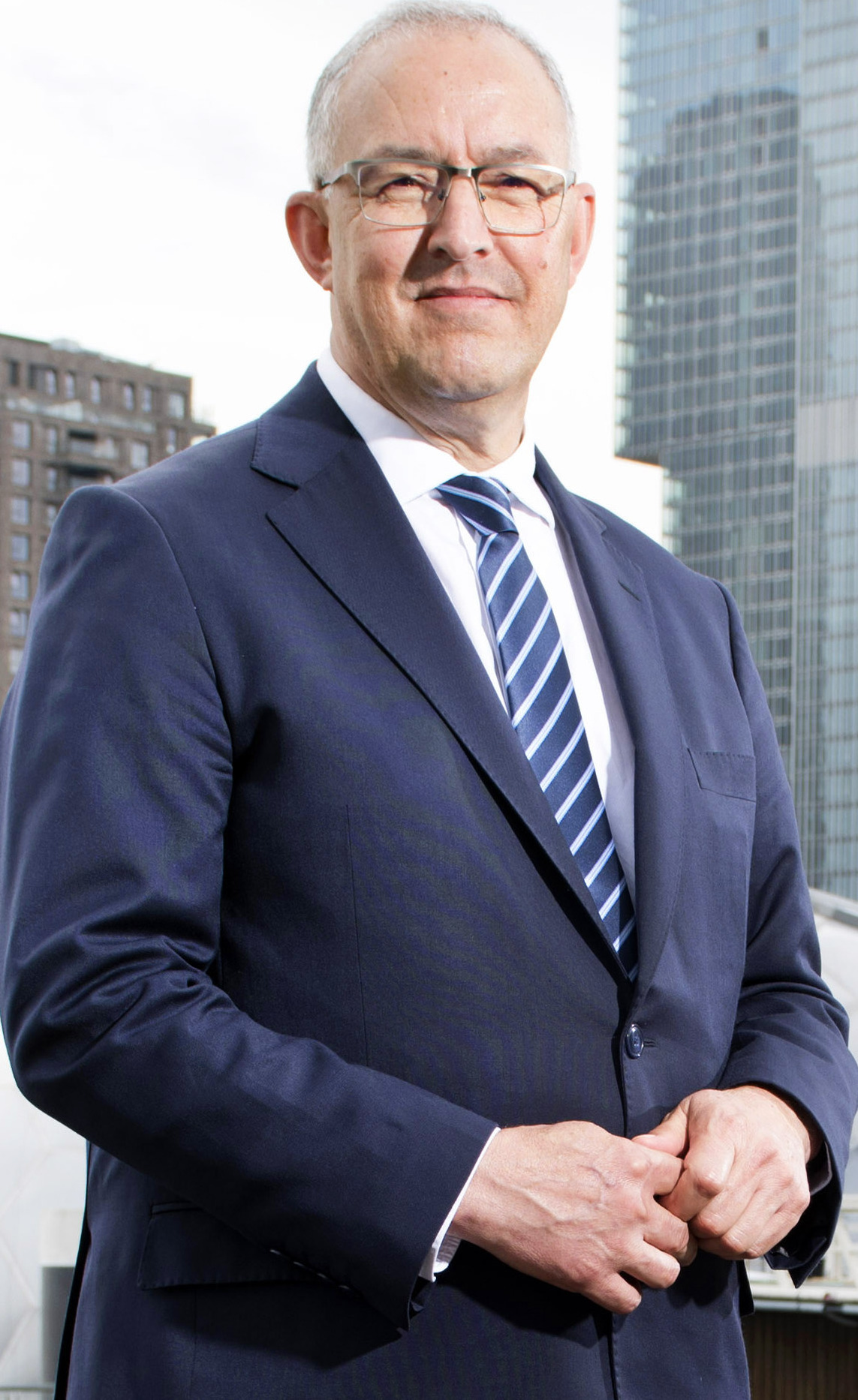
- Aboutaleb in 2019

Mayor of Rotterdam
- In office 5 January 2009 – 1 October 2024
- Preceded by: Ivo Opstelten
- Succeeded by: Carola Schouten

State Secretary for Social Affairs and Employment
- In office 22 February 2007 – 12 December 2008
- Prime Minister: Jan Peter Balkenende
- Preceded by: Henk van Hoof
- Succeeded by: Jetta Klijnsma

Personal details
- Born: 29 August 1961 (age 65) Beni Sidel, Morocco
- Party: Labour (since 2003)
- Children: 3 daughters and 1 son
- Education: The Hague University of Applied Sciences
- Occupation: Politician · Civil servant · Journalist · Electrical engineer · Nonprofit director · Political pundit · Author · Columnist · Poet

Ahmed Aboutaleb (Arabic: أحمد أبو طالب; born 29 August 1961) is a Dutch politician of Moroccan origin. A member of the Labour Party (PvdA), he served as Mayor of Rotterdam from 2009 to 2024.

== Early life and career ==
Ahmed Aboutaleb was born on 29 August 1961 in Beni Sidel, Nador city, Rif, Morocco. He grew up as a son of a Riffian Berber Sunni imam in a small village in the Nador Province, Rif region. Together with his mother and brothers he moved to the Netherlands in 1976, when he was 15 years old. Aboutaleb had already noticed how he differed from other children. As he says in an interview: 'I was so different, such a school dork. I wanted to learn, I wanted to know everything.'

Aboutaleb then studied electrical engineering with a specialisation in Telecommunication at different schools up to the Hogere Technische School (now The Hague University of Applied Sciences) where he obtained a Bachelor of Engineering degree.

After graduating he found work as reporter for Veronica TV, NOS-radio and RTL Nieuws. He also worked at the public relations department of the Dutch health ministry. In 1998, Aboutaleb became director of the Forum organisation, an institute dealing with multiculturalism in the Netherlands. He also obtained a post as a civil servant with the municipality of Amsterdam. In 2002, he applied for a government position with the Pim Fortuyn List party but chose not to take it up after disagreeing with the LPF's policies. He joined the PvdA a year later.

== Politics ==
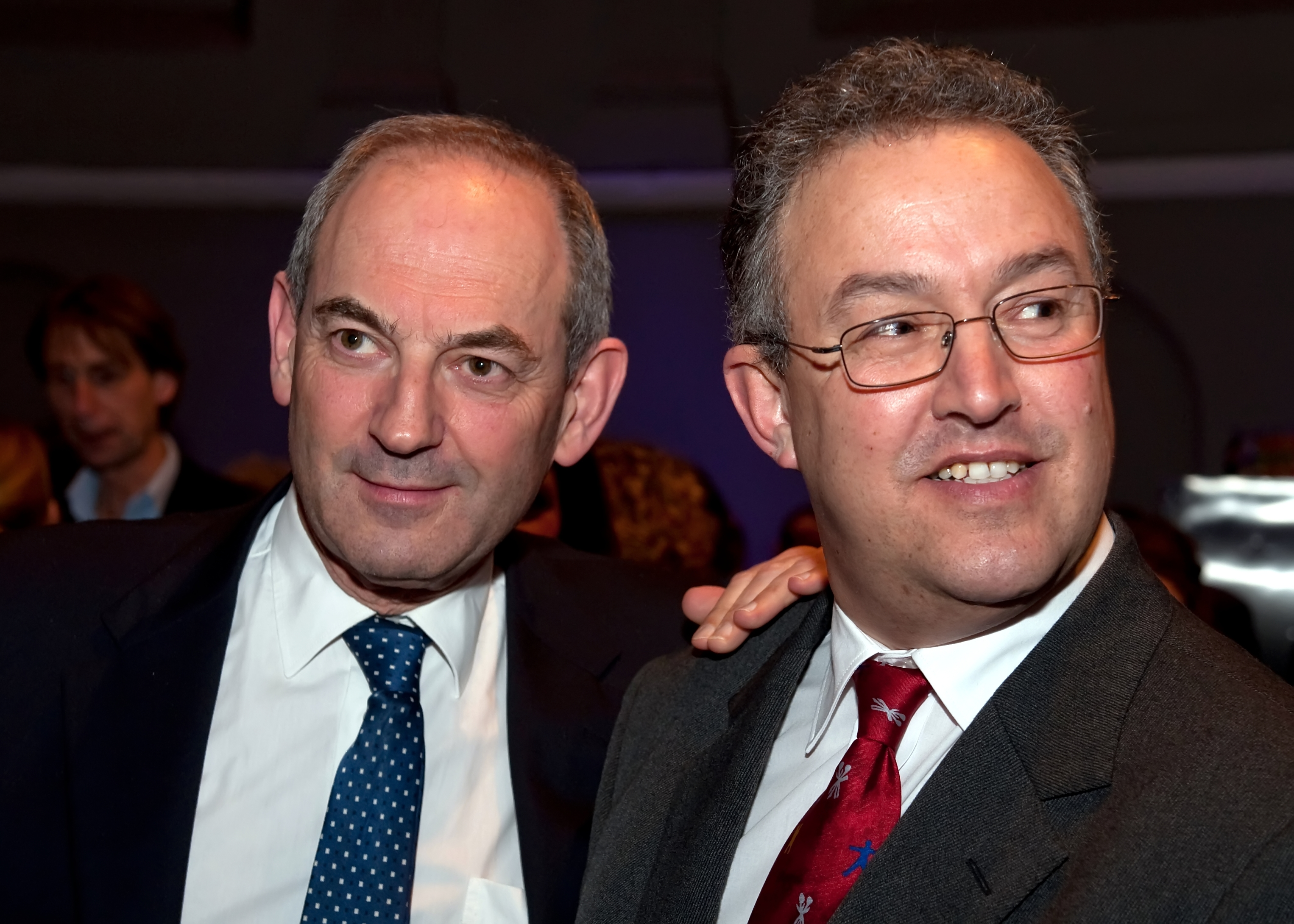
Mayor of Amsterdam Job Cohen and Ahmed Aboutaleb in Amsterdam on 3 February 2010.

In January 2004, Aboutaleb succeeded the scandal-plagued Rob Oudkerk as alderman in Amsterdam. Labour Party leader Wouter Bos in his book Wat Wouter Wil (English: What Wouter wants) said that if the Labour Party was involved in forming the next cabinet after the 2006 election, Aboutaleb would be offered a ministerial post. Aboutaleb himself claimed at the time he wanted to focus on his work as alderman and that it was "important first that the PvdA wins the election."

When the Labour Party really did become part of a new coalition, Aboutaleb was just offered the position of State Secretary for Social Affairs, but said that he did not mind the lesser function, and believed he could learn a lot from Piet Hein Donner, the Minister of Social Affairs.

Along with another deputy minister, Nebahat Albayrak, of Turkish descent, Aboutaleb was criticised by Geert Wilders at the time of their announced appointments for holding dual passports. According to Wilders and his party, government ministers should not have dual citizenship, which they say implies dual allegiance.

On 31 October 2008 Aboutaleb was appointed (in the Netherlands, mayors are not elected) Mayor of Rotterdam. (Note: According to Ronald Plasterk (then-Labour minister), Labour deputy premier Bos had kept his application a secret from premier Balkenende and Aboutaleb's superior, minister Donner (both CDA), because the former would have blocked it.) He succeeded the former mayor, Ivo Opstelten on 5 January 2009. Jetta Klijnsma succeeded him as State Secretary. Aboutaleb, who came to the Netherlands from Morocco, was the first mayor of a large city in the Netherlands who is of both immigrant origin and the Muslim faith. He is of Riffian Berber ancestry, and a dual citizen of the Netherlands and Morocco.

In 2021, Aboutaleb was the joint winner of the 2021 World Mayor award by City Mayors Foundation. He had been appointed to a third term that same year. The Algemeen Dagblad wrote in early 2024 that 2023 had been one of Aboutaleb's most difficult, citing growing criticism from the municipal council. Livable Rotterdam and the VVD protested his decision not to raise the Israeli flag at the city hall in response to the October 7 attacks. Citing personal reasons, Aboutaleb announced during his New Year address on 9 January 2024 that he would step down as mayor later in the year – around halfway through his term.

== Translator ==
Aboutaleb is also a great fan of poetry, especially Arabic poetry. In June 2010, he presented a few of his translated poems in Arabic in Rotterdam during the festival Poetry International.

== Bibliography ==
- Droom & daad (2015; Dream & action)
- De roep van de stad (2015; The call of the city)

== Notes ==
Political offices
Preceded by Henk van Hoof	State Secretary for Social Affairs and Employment; 2007–2008	Succeeded by Jetta Klijnsma
Preceded by Ivo Opstelten	Mayor of Rotterdam; 2009–2024	Succeeded by Carola Schouten
