= Koroko Forest =

Coastal forest in Morocco

Koroko (Arabic: ۘالِإسلَامغابة كوروكو) is a forest full of trees and plants in the north of Morocco that overlook the Mediterranean Sea. The Koroko Highlands region is an ecological and biological site, covering an area of about 5,400 hectares, of which 1,800 hectares are densely forested.

The Koroko forest belongs to the province of Nador and contains important animal populations, the most important of which are the Barbary macaque and the wild boar. And many types of trees such as green pine, cypress, eucalyptus, oak and thuya, covering a surface of 5,200 hectares.
