= Nador West Med =

Port near Nador, Morocco

Port of Nador West Med
- Satellite imagery of the Port in 2026
- Interactive map of Port of Nador West Med

Location
- Country: Morocco
- Location: Iaazzanene, Nador Province
- Coordinates: 35.250000°N 3.172000°W

Details
- Opened: October 31, 2026; 15 days ago
- Land area: 1,500 ha

Statistics
- Website; NadorWestMed.ma

Nador West Med (Nador Med) is a Moroccan transshipment port under service in the Bay of Betoya, located at the estuary of the Kert River, 30 km west of the city of Nador, in the eastern Rif region, northeastern Morocco. The container component of Nador West Med is designed with an initial capacity of 3 million TEU, with the possibility of a 2 million TEU increase.

== Strategy ==
The project aims to strengthen Morocco's presence on international maritime routes. Morocco's global ranking in maritime connectivity improved from 78th in 2004 to 17th in 2011 following the completion of Tanger Med.

== Construction ==
Construction began in 2016 with an initial planned duration of 60 months. The project cost is estimated at 7.61 billion dirhams (approximately 800 million USD). The completion was initially scheduled for 2024 with an opening in 2025.

In 2016, an international consortium won the construction contract for the Nador West Med port. The consortium consists of the Moroccan group SGTM, the Luxembourg group JDN, and the Turkish group STFA.

On the 31st of October 2026, the first container terminal launched operations.

== Port Facilities ==
The port in its first phase will feature:

- A main protective dike of approximately 4,200 meters
- A counter-dike of 1,200 meters
- A hydrocarbon terminal with three oil berths (20 meters deep)
- A coal terminal with a 360-meter quay and a depth of 20 meters
- A container terminal with a 1,520-meter quay (18 meters deep) and a 76-hectare land area
- Various other facilities including a general cargo terminal, a roll-on/roll-off berth, and a service quay

In terms of annual capacities, Nador is projected to handle:

- 25 million tons of hydrocarbons
- 7 million tons of coal
- 3 million tons of various goods
- 3 million TEU containers, with potential for expansion to 5 million TEU

== Geographic Position ==
The Bay of Betoya was chosen for its strategic location, offering:

- Mild exposure to swells
- Favorable topographic and bathymetric conditions
- Proximity to maritime routes between the Suez Canal and the Strait of Gibraltar
- Availability of public and private land

== Development and Financing ==
The port complex is planned to include:

- A large deepwater port
- An energy hub for production, packaging, and storage
- A port platform for container transshipment, import-export, and bulk product processing
- An integrated industrial platform for national and foreign investors

As of July 2024, the African Development Bank (AfDB) has provided significant financial support to the project:

- A new loan of 120 million euros was offered to finance an industrial zone at the port
- This brings AfDB's total contribution to Nador West Med-related development projects to 489.8 million euros

The port is expected to host Morocco's first liquefied natural gas terminal.
