= Afsou =

Afsou أفسو / ⴰⴼⵙⵓ
- commune
- Location within Morocco
- Coordinates: 34.8393°N 3.1729°W
- Country: Morocco
- Region: Oriental
- Province: Nador

Area
  - Total: 301.8 km^{2} (116.5 sq mi)

Population (2024)
  - Total: 2,020
  - Density: 6.694/km^{2} (17.34/sq mi)
- Time zone: UTC+0 (GMT)

Afsou (Tarifit: ⴰⴼⵙⵓ; Arabic: أفسو) is a commune in the Nador Province of the Oriental administrative region of Morocco. At the time of the 2024 census, the commune had a total population of 2,020 people.
