= Al Massira Dam =

Dam and reservoir in Morocco

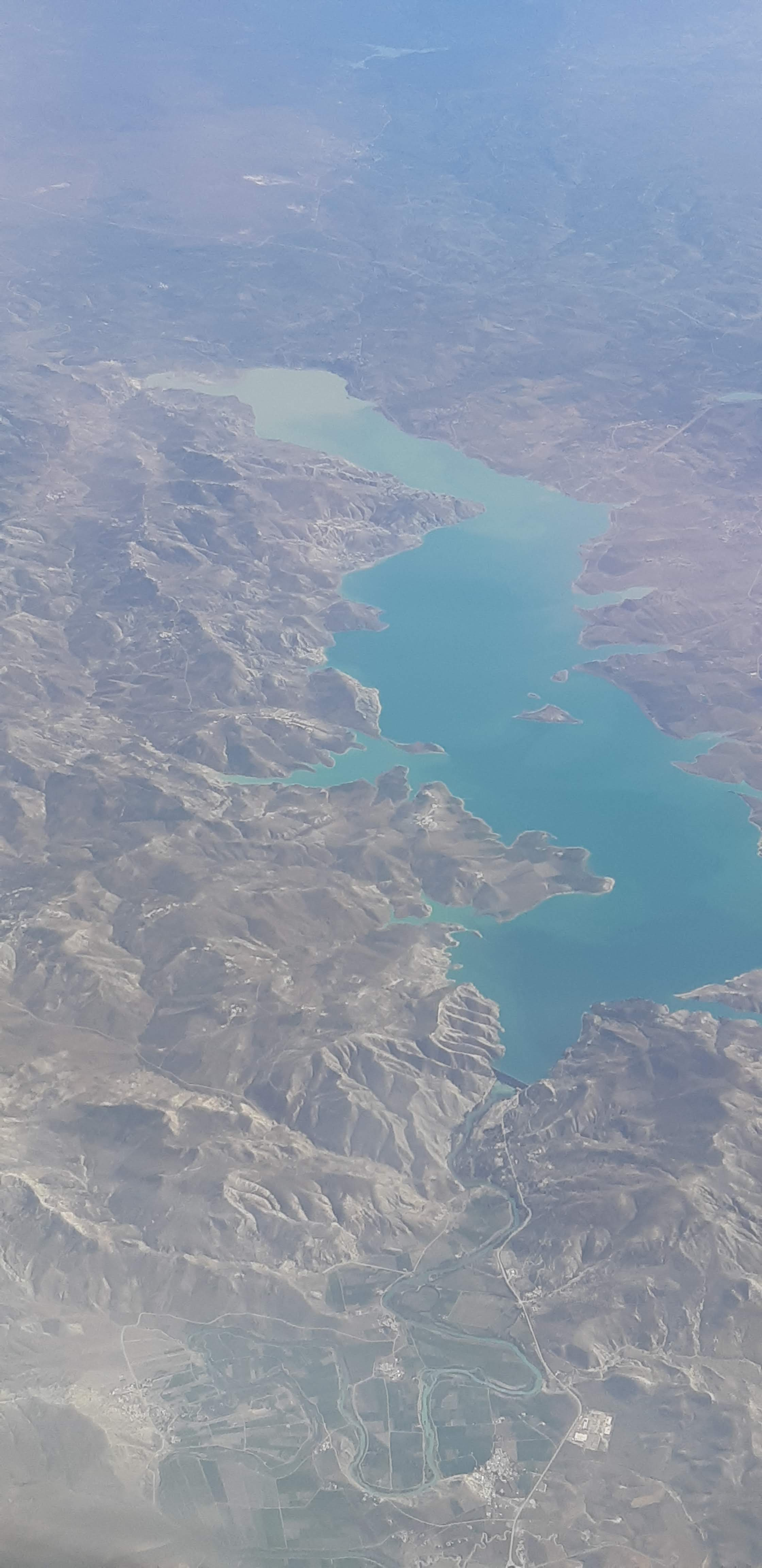
- Interactive map of Al Massira Dam
- Official name: Barrage Al Massira
- Country: Morocco
- Location: Settat
- Coordinates: 32°28′31″N 07°38′15″W
- Status: Operational
- Opening date: 1979
- Owner: Office National de L'Electricite (ONE)

Dam and spillways
- Type of dam: Buttress
- Impounds: Oum Er-Rbia River
- Height: 82 m (269 ft)
- Length: 390 m (1,280 ft)
- Dam volume: 354,000 m^{3} (12,500,000 cu ft)

Reservoir
- Total capacity: 2,760×10^{6} m^{3} (2,240,000 acre⋅ft)
- Catchment area: 28,500 km^{2} (11,000 sq mi)
- Surface area: 80 km^{2} (31 sq mi)

Power Station
- Commission date: 1980
- Turbines: 2 x 64 MW (86,000 hp) Francis-type
- Installed capacity: 128 MW (172,000 hp)
- Annual generation: 221 GWh (800 TJ)

Ramsar Wetland
- Official name: Barrage Al Massira
- Designated: 15 January 2005
- Reference no.: 1471

The Al Massira Dam is a buttress dam located 70 kilometres (43 mi) south of Settat on the Oum Er-Rbia River in Settat Province, Morocco. Completed in 1979, the dam provides water for the irrigation of over 100,000 hectares (250,000 acres) of farmland in the Doukkala region. The dam's hydroelectric power plant also generates 221 gigawatt-hours (800 TJ) on average annually. The power station was commissioned in 1980. Just north of the dam is a rip rap saddle dam that supports water elevation in the reservoir.

== Environment ==
The dam's reservoir and wetlands were designated as a Ramsar site in 2005. The wetlands have also been designated an Important Bird Area (IBA) by BirdLife International because they support significant populations of wintering waterbirds, including ruddy shelducks, marbled teals, northern shovelers and gull-billed terns.

In 2024 analysis of satellite images of the dam by the BBC revealed the volume of water was 3% of the amount present nine years previously. The country had suffered from six consecutive years of drought. The Moroccan water ministry told the BBC that use of the dam's water for irrigating farmland had been suspended since 2021, the water being reserved for supplying cities such as Casablanca and Marrakesh. Many of the springs in the Middle Atlas mountains, which feed the reservoir, had dried-up. Reduced snowfall at higher altitude had also contributed to less meltwater flowing into the streams feeding the dam. In August 2023 Morocco recorded a record highest-ever temperature of 50.4C which caused an increase in evaporation, adding to a reduction in water's level.

== See also ==
- Mohamed V Dam – another Ramsar site in Morocco
- List of power stations in Morocco
