= Bni Bouifrour =

Bni Bouifrour / Ait Bouifrour ⴰⵢⵜ ⴱⵡⵉⴼⵔⵓⵔ
- commune
- Interactive map of Bni Bouifrour / Ait Bouifrour
- Coordinates: 35.153611°N 2.986111°W
- Country: Morocco
- Region: Oriental
- Province: Nador

Area
  - Total: 16.70 km^{2} (6.45 sq mi)

Population (2024)
  - Total: 6,846
  - Density: 409.8/km^{2} (1,061/sq mi)
- Time zone: UTC+0 (GMT)

Bni Bouifrour or Ait Bouifrour (Riffian-Berber: ⴰⵢⵜ ⴱⵡⵉⴼⵔⵓⵔ) is a commune in the Nador Province of the Oriental administrative region of Morocco. It is also the name of a Riffian subtribe within the Guelaya. At the time of the 2024 census, the commune had a total population of 6,846 people.

== Notable people ==
- Oussama Assaidi - Moroccan footballer
- Mohammed Benzakour - Moroccan author and journalist
- Ahmed Marcouch - Moroccan-Dutch politician, has been serving as the mayor of Arnhem, Netherlands since 2017.
