= Farkhana =

Coordinates: 35°17′N 3°01′W

Farkhana ⴼⴰⵔⵅⴰⵏⴰ فرخانة
- Town
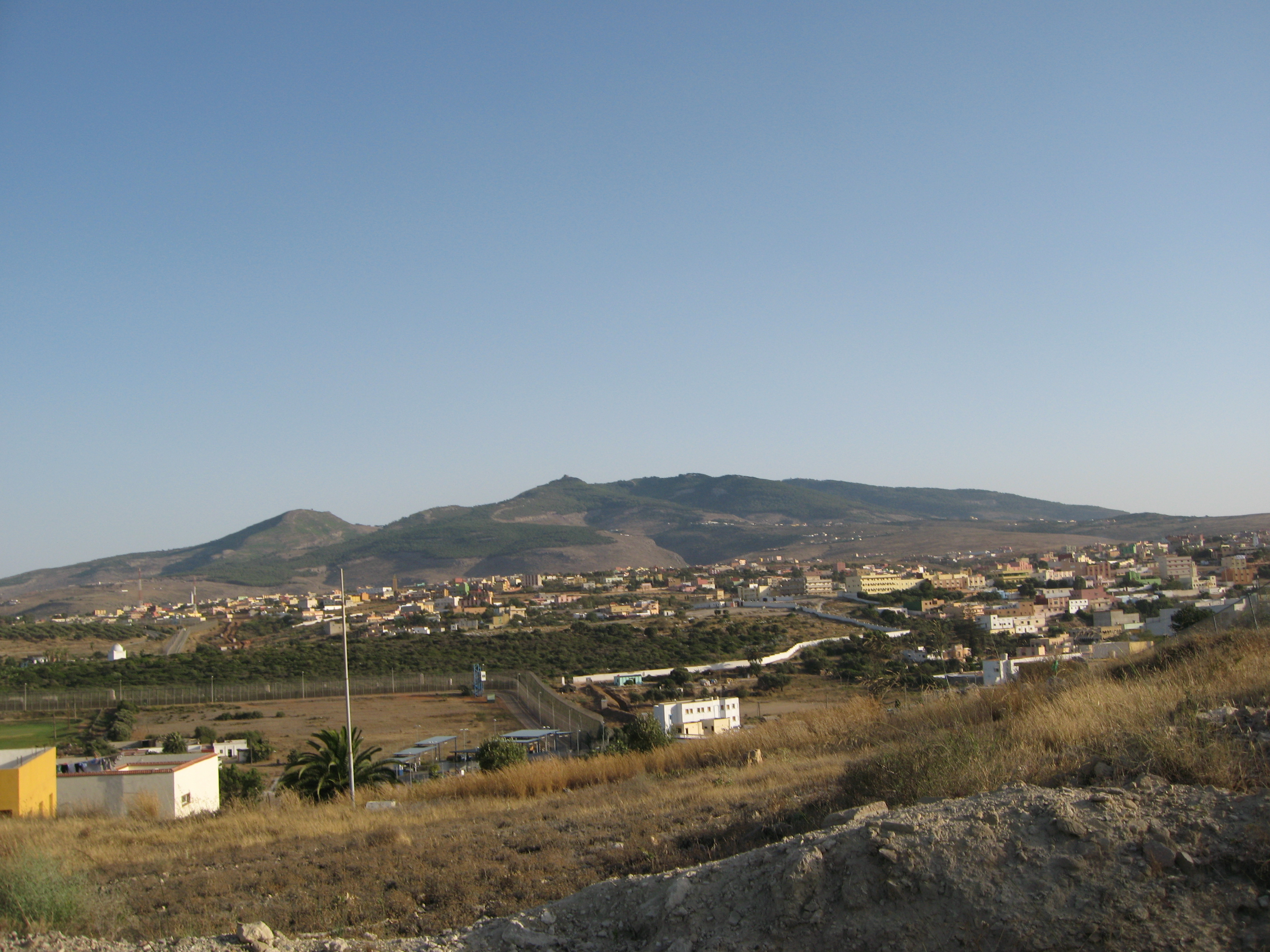
- Interactive map of Farkhana
- Country: Morocco
- Region: Oriental
- Province: Nador

Population (2024)
  - Total: 50,508 (inc. Beni Ansar)
- Time zone: UTC+0 (GMT)

Farkhana (Tarifit: ⴼⴰⵔⵅⴰⵏⴰ; Arabic: فرخانة) is a town in Nador Province, Oriental, Morocco. According to the 2024 census, it has a population of 50,508 people (inc. Beni Ansar).
