= Arekmane =

Arekmane أركمان Qariya
- commune
- Interactive map of Arekmane
- Coordinates: 35.1172°N 2.7256°W
- Country: Morocco
- Region: Oriental
- Province: Nador

Area
  - Total: 186.8 km^{2} (72.1 sq mi)

Population (2024)
  - Total: 16,477
  - Density: 88.22/km^{2} (228.5/sq mi)
- Time zone: UTC+0 (GMT)

Arekmane, Kariat or Kariat Arekmane (Arabic: أركمان) is a commune in the Nador Province of the Oriental administrative region of Morocco. At the time of the 2024 census, the commune had a total population of 16,477 people.
