= Ihaddadene =

Ihaddadene ⵉⵃⴷⴰⴷⴰⵏ
- commune
- Interactive map of Ihaddadene
- Coordinates: 35°09′N 2°58′W
- Country: Morocco
- Region: Oriental
- Province: Nador

Area
  - Total: 19.11 km^{2} (7.38 sq mi)

Population (2024)
  - Total: 15,667
  - Density: 819.9/km^{2} (2,124/sq mi)
- Time zone: UTC+0 (GMT)

Ihaddadene (Riffian-Berber: ⵉⵃⴷⴰⴷⴰⵏ, Arabic: إحدادن) is a commune in the Nador Province of the Oriental administrative region of Morocco. At the time of the 2024 census, the commune had a total population of 15,667 people.
