= Jaadar =

- Town
- Interactive map of Jaadar
- Coordinates: 35°09′34″N 2°59′21″W
- Country: Morocco
- Region: Oriental
- Province: Nador Province

Population (2004)
  - Total: 9,496
- Time zone: UTC+0 (GMT)

Jaadar is a town in Nador Province, Oriental, Morocco. According to the 2004 census, it has a population of 9,496.
