= Bouarg =

Bouarg بوعرك
- commune
- Interactive map of Bouarg
- Coordinates: 35.1289°N 2.9519°W
- Country: Morocco
- Region: Oriental
- Province: Nador

Population (2024)
  - Total: 44,626
- Time zone: UTC+0 (GMT)

Bouarg (Arabic: بوعرك) is a commune in the Nador Province of the Oriental administrative region of Morocco. At the time of the 2024 census, the commune had a total population of 44,626 people.
