= Oulad Daoud Zkhanine =

Oulad Daoud Zkhanine اولاد داوود زخانين / ⵡⵍⴰⴷ ⴷⴰⵡⴻⴷ
- commune
- Interactive map of Oulad Daoud Zkhanine
- Coordinates: 34.962778°N 2.505°W
- Country: Morocco
- Region: Oriental
- Province: Nador

Area
  - Total: 235 km^{2} (91 sq mi)

Population (2024)
  - Total: 3,149
- Time zone: UTC+0 (GMT)

Oulad Daoud Zkhanine (Tarifit: ⵡⵍⴰⴷ ⴷⴰⵡⴻⴷ; Arabic: اولاد داوود زخانين) is a commune in the Nador Province of the Oriental administrative region of Morocco. At the time of the 2024 census, the commune had a total population of 3,149 people.
