= Kariat Arekmane =

Town in Morocco

Coordinates: 35°06′15″N 2°44′04″W

Kariat Arekmane قرية أركمان
- Town
- Interactive map of Kariat Arekmane
- Country: Morocco
- Region: Oriental
- Province: Nador Province

Population (2004)
  - Total: 5,266
- Time zone: UTC+0 (GMT)

Kariat Arekmane (Arabic: قرية أركمان) is a town in Nador Province, Oriental, Morocco. According to the 2004 census it has a population of 5,266.

== Monograph ==
Geographical Setting: The commune of Arkman overlooks the Mediterranean Sea and the Marchica Lagoon. Its terrain is predominantly flat, with the central village situated at an elevation of 0.5 meters above sea level.

Climate: The area has a semi-desert climate influenced by maritime humidity. The average annual rainfall is 203 mm. The soil is of a sandy-clay type.

Water Resources: Arkman has significant groundwater reserves, with a considerable number of wells that meet the population’s water needs.

== Population (2014 Census) ==
Total population: 18,998 inhabitants

Urban population: 3,773 inhabitants

Rural population: 15,225 inhabitants

Number of households: 2,461

Demographic growth rate: 2.4%

Active population: 70%

== Transportation ==
National Coastal Road No. 16 passes through Arkman and serves as the only main road linking the commune to the city of Nador. Arkman also contains a network of unclassified secondary roads and tracks connecting the commune’s center to the surrounding villages.

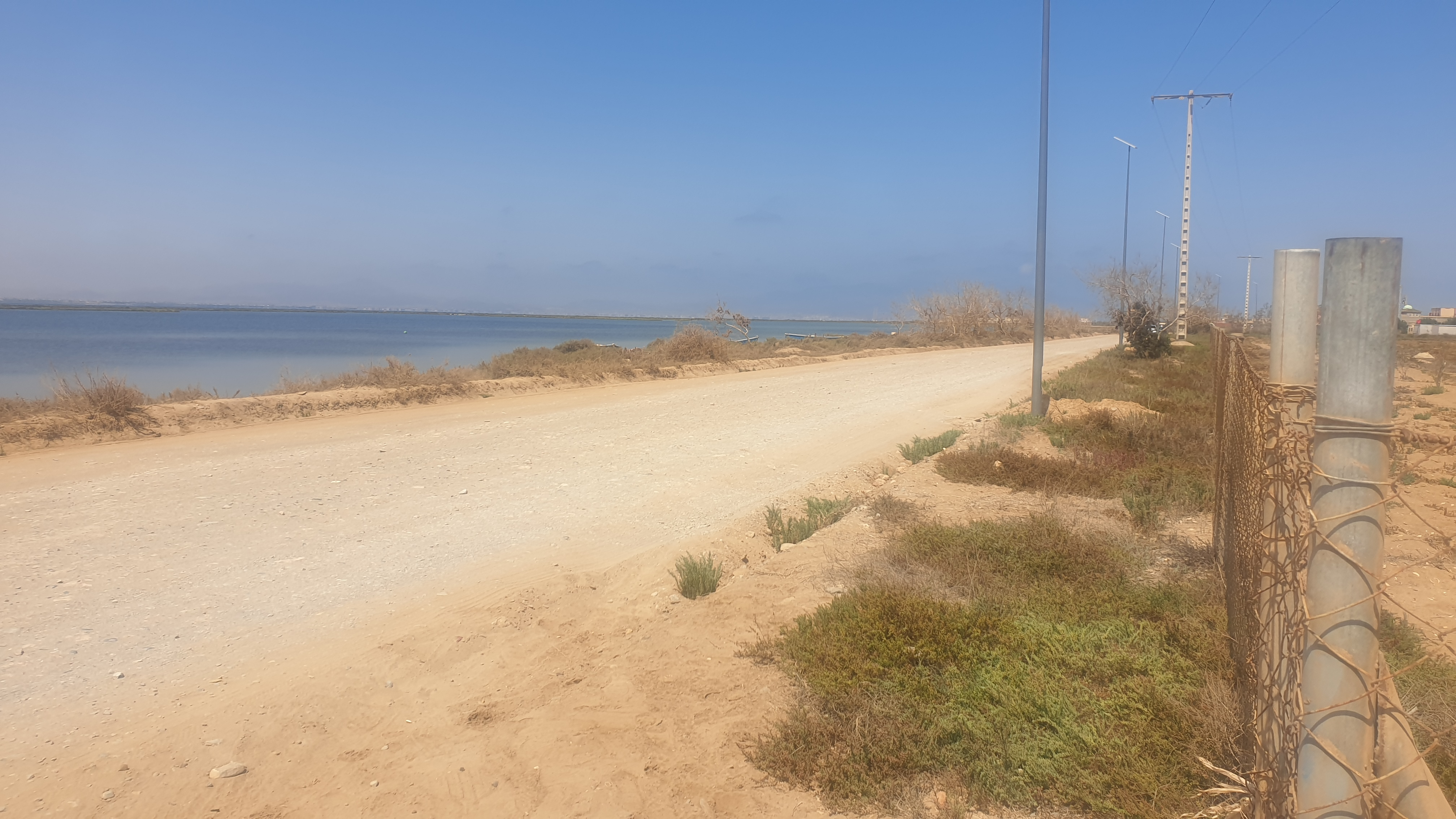
The road connecting the village of Arkmane to the Almouhandis Beach and Boukana in the Nador - National Coastal Road No. 16
