= Al Barkanyene =

Al Barkanyene Ibarkanen البركانيين / ⵉⴱⴰⵔⴽⴰⵏⴻⵏ
- commune
- Location within Morocco
- Coordinates: 35.0638°N 2.6030°W
- Country: Morocco
- Region: Oriental
- Province: Nador

Area
  - Total: 82.26 km^{2} (31.76 sq mi)

Population (2024)
  - Total: 2,278
  - Density: 27.69/km^{2} (71.7/sq mi)
- Time zone: UTC+0 (GMT)

Al Barkanyene (Tarifit: ⵉⴱⴰⵔⴽⴰⵏⴻⵏ Ibarkanen; Arabic: البركانيين) is a commune in the Nador Province of the Oriental administrative region of Morocco. At the time of the 2024 census, the commune had a total population of 2,278 people.
