= Bni Oukil Oulad M'Hand =

Bni Oukil Oulad M'Hand بني وكيل أولاد امحند / ⴱⵏⵉ ⵓⴽⵉⵍ ⵡⵍⴰⴷ ⵎⵃⴰⵏⴷ
- commune
- Interactive map of Bni Oukil Oulad M'Hand
- Coordinates: 35.000556°N 3.042222°W
- Country: Morocco
- Region: Oriental
- Province: Nador

Area
  - Total: 147.8 km^{2} (57.1 sq mi)

Population (2024)
  - Total: 14,691
- Time zone: UTC+0 (GMT)

Bni Oukil Oulad M'Hand (Tarifit: ⴱⵏⵉ ⵓⴽⵉⵍ ⵡⵍⴰⴷ ⵎⵃⴰⵏⴷ; Arabic: بني وكيل أولاد امحند) is a commune in the Nador Province of the Oriental administrative region of Morocco. At the time of the 2024 census, the commune had a total population of 14,691.
