= Tiztoutine =

Tiztoutine Tizḍudin تزطوطين / ⵜⵉⵣⴹⵓⴷⵉⵏ
- Town
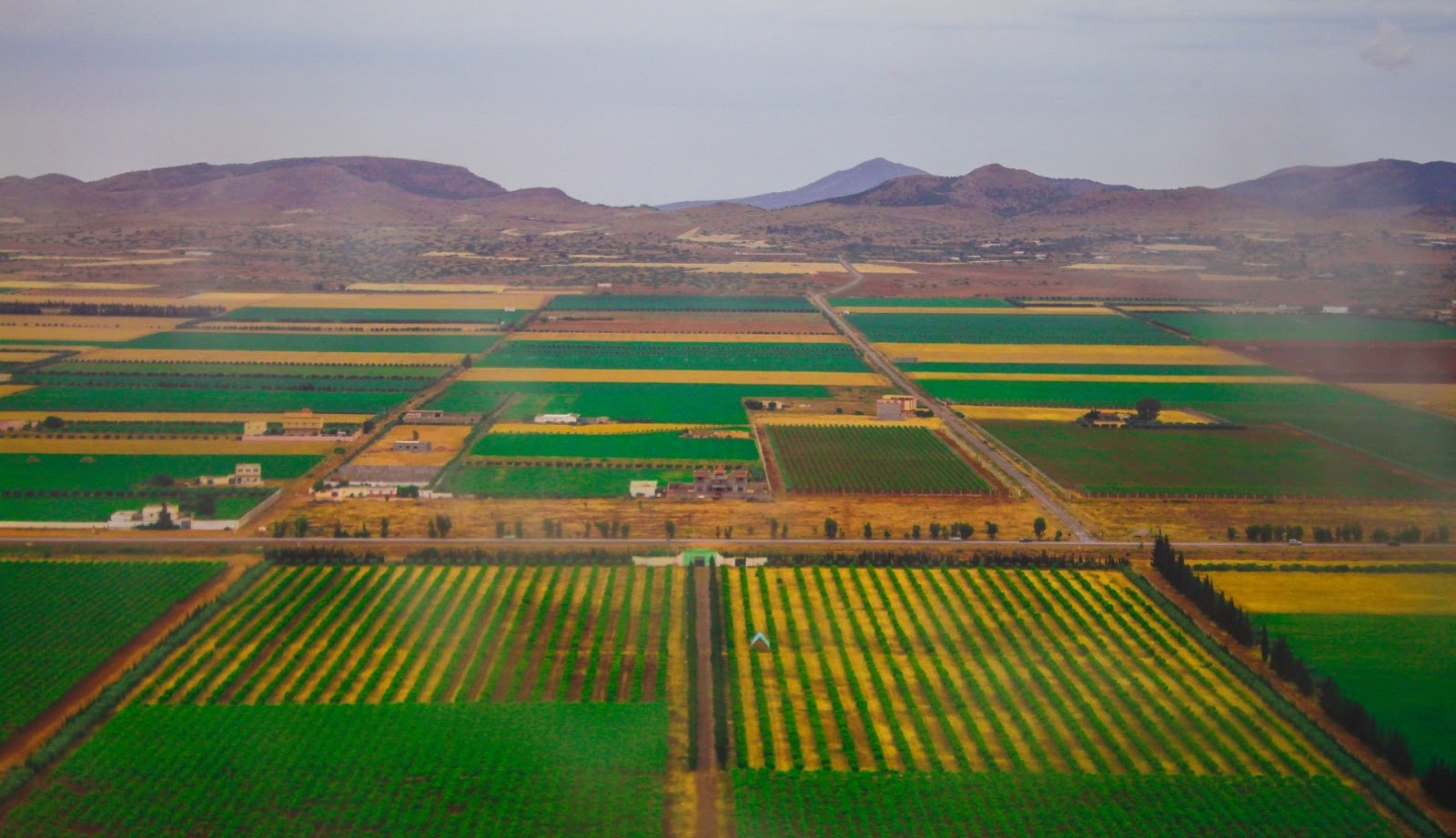

- Location within Morocco
- Coordinates: 34°59′N 3°09′W
- Country: Morocco
- Region: Oriental
- Province: Nador

Area
  - Land: 80.0 sq mi (207.1 km^{2})

Population (2024)
  - Total: 9,349
  - Density: 116.9/sq mi (45.15/km^{2})
- Time zone: UTC+0 (WET)
  - Summer (DST): UTC+1 (WEST)

Tiztoutine (Tarifit: Tizḍudin, ⵜⵉⵣⴹⵓⴷⵉⵏ; Arabic: تزطوطين) is a town in Nador Province, Oriental, Morocco. According to the 2024 census, it has a population of 9,349.
