= Oulad Settout =

Oulad Settout اولاد ستوت
- commune
- Interactive map of Oulad Settout
- Coordinates: 34.923333°N 2.766944°W
- Country: Morocco
- Region: Oriental
- Province: Nador

Area
  - Total: 417.1 km^{2} (161.0 sq mi)

Population (2024)
  - Total: 26,052
- Time zone: UTC+0 (GMT)

Oulad Settout (Arabic: اولاد ستوت, Tarifit: ⵡⵍⴰⴷ ⵙⵜⵓⵜ) is a commune in the Nador Province of the Oriental administrative region of Morocco. At the time of the 2024 census, the commune had a total population of 26,052 people.
