= Bni Chiker =

Bni Chiker Ait Shishar (Tarifit) بني شيكر (Arabic) ⴰⵢⵜ ⵛⵉⵛⴰⵔ (Standard Moroccan Tamazight)
- Town
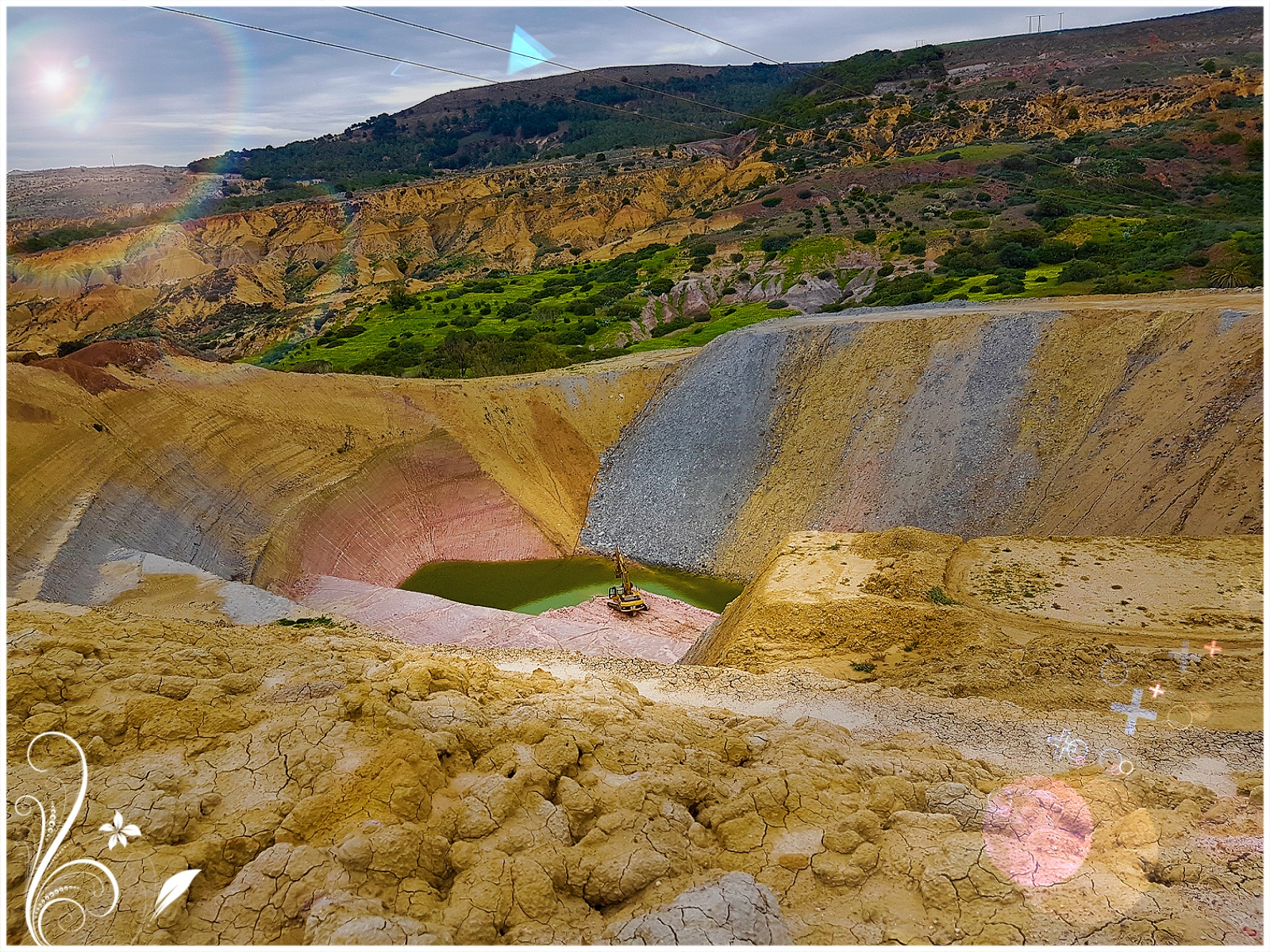

- Location within Morocco Location within Africa
- Coordinates: 35.273529°N 3.015069°W
- Country: Morocco
- Region: Oriental
- Province: Nador Province

Area
  - Total: 55.8 sq mi (144.4 km^{2})

Population (2024)
  - Total: 22.763
  - Density: 408/sq mi (157.6/km^{2})
- Time zone: UTC+0 (WET)
  - Summer (DST): UTC+1 (WEST)

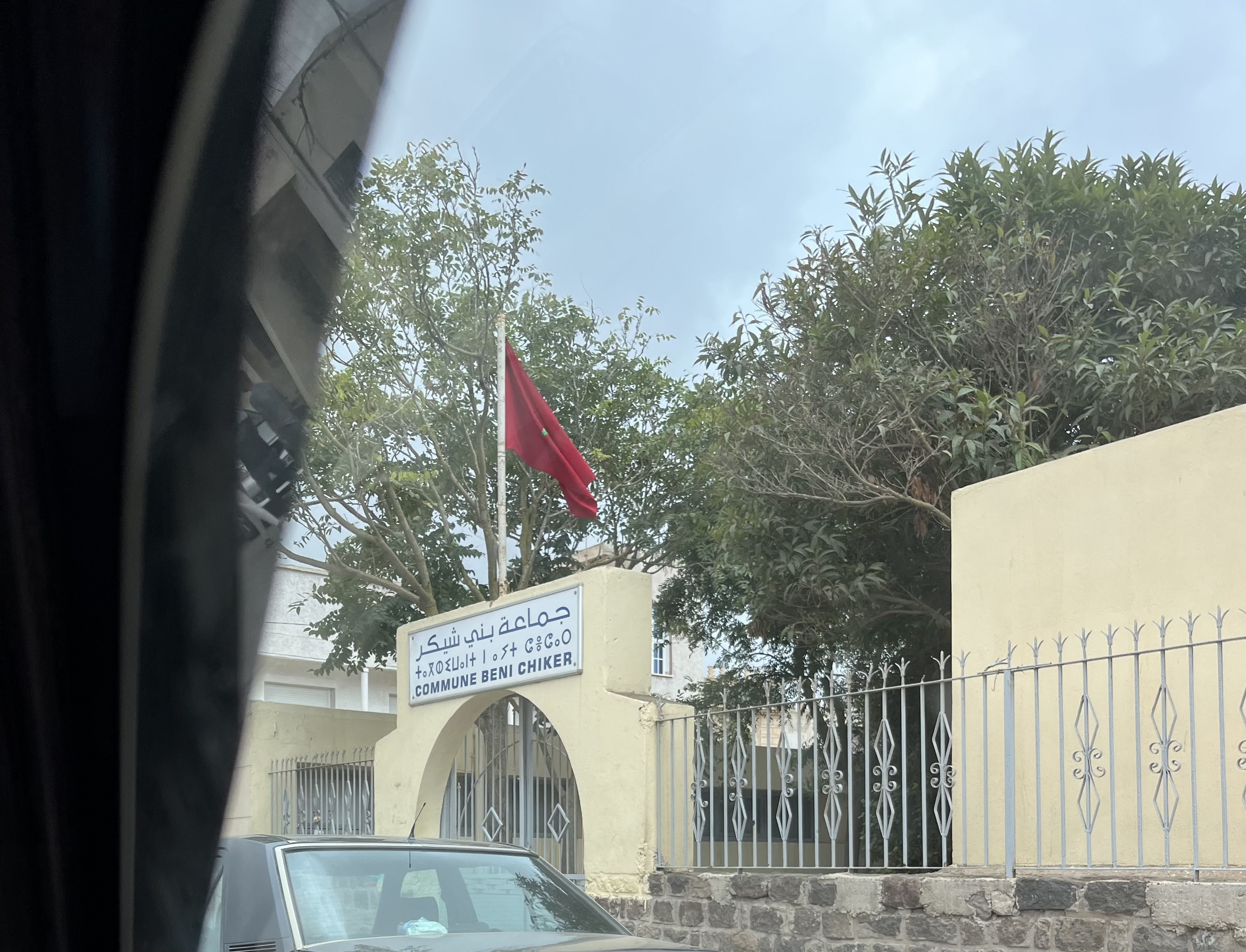
Town hall in Beni Chiker

Bni Chiker or Beni Chiker (Note: Tarifit: Ait Shishar Arabic: بني شيكر Standard Moroccan Tamazight: ⴰⵢⵜ ⵛⵉⵛⴰⵔ, romanized: Ayt Cicar) is a town in Nador Province, Morocco. At the time of the 2024 census, it had a population of 22,763.

It is the birthplace of the writer Mohammed Choukri (1935-2003) and of Najat Vallaud-Belkacem, who on 16 May 2012 was appointed Minister of Women's Rights and Government spokesperson in the Ayrault government in France.

Bni Chiker is known largely for its tourist hotspots such as the beaches Charrana, Cara Blanca and Mina Rosita.

== History ==
Beni chiker was first mentioned in the 16th Century. A large proportion of the population is Riffian Berber.

In 1880 the tribe had the following groups as subdivisions:

- Abdouna (Iabdounen)
- Beni Athman
- Berdjioun
- Beni Bou Armaren

== Name ==
The native name Ayt Shishar is a combination of 'Ayt', which indicates tribal affiliation in Berber languages, and 'Shishar'. 'Ayt' corresponds to the Arabic Banu, meaning "sons of". The etymology of 'Shishar' on the other hand is disputed. It has been proposed that it may be derived from the Arabic word shukr, meaning 'thankfulness', or that it is of Berber origin.

According to one tradition, the name can be traced back to the name of an eponymous ancestor named Achichar, who is said to have belonged to the Riffian Botouya tribe. Other genealogists derive the name from a contraction of the old Riffian words 'achich', meaning 'challenge', and 'ar', meaning 'lion', thus giving the meaning 'challenger of the lion'.
