= Cazaza =

Former coastal city in Morocco

Coordinates: 35°16′40″N 3°5′17″W

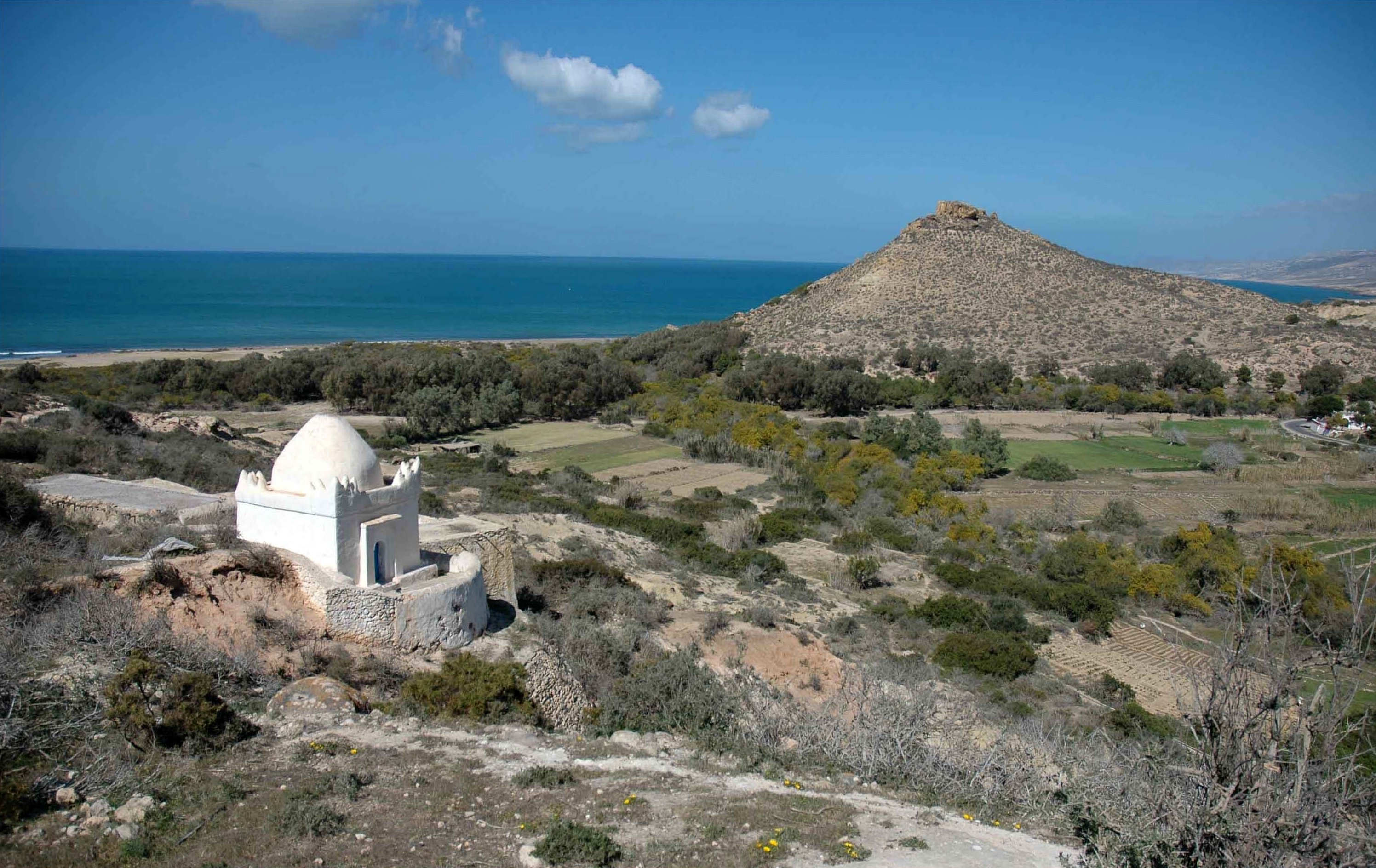
Tomb of Sidi Messaoud and the hill of Cazaza.

Cazaza or Ghassasa (Note: The site appears in medieval and early-modern Muslim and European sources under several variant names, including Gasassa, Kudyat Gassasa, al-Kudyat al-Bayda, Puerto de Gassasa, Gasâsa, Cazaza, Micaçah, Cacuta, Caçaça, Ghasasa, Gasasa, Calasa, and Gafsasa.) was a city on the western coast of Cape Three Forks in Morocco (present-day Nador Province), around 18 km from Melilla. It was here that the exiled Boabdil, last Emir of Granada, landed when he left the Iberian Peninsula in 1492.

== Geography ==
The ruins of Cazaza are located on the Moroccan Mediterranean coast, west of the Tres Forcas peninsula. More specifically, the city lies in the commune of Iaazzanene, west of Ighssassen beach and surrounded by the Haduba River, several hundred metres from the marabout of Sidi Masoud. It is positioned on a hill called Er-Kudiez or el-Kudia.

== History ==
The name is most likely based on the Berber language word Akhsas meaning human head. In the eleventh century, Al-Bakri mentioned Cazaza as the name of a tribe while listing the ports of the Emirate of Nekor.

According to al-Umari, Cazaza paid the state an annual tax of 30,000 dinars, almost 3% of the total, comparable to cities like Taza, Melilla, and al-Mazamma.

In 1505 Spanish forces based in Melilla led by Juan Alfonso Pérez de Guzmán, 3rd Duke of Medina Sidonia took Cazaza from Wattasid Morocco. King Ferdinand granted him the title 'Marquess of Cazaza', which survives to this day. Although the noble title has endured, the Spanish lost control of Cazaza in 1533 because of the treachery of five of its garrison who betrayed it.

It was never rebuilt after the destruction when it was conquered. Its ruins are visible today.

== See also ==
- European enclaves in North Africa before 1830
