= Bni Sidel Louta =

Bni Sidel Louta Ait Sider Luṭa ⴱⵏⵉ ⵙⵉⴷⴰⵍ ⵍⵓⵟⴰ
- commune
- Location within Morocco
- Coordinates: 35°6′25″N 3°3′56″W
- Country: Morocco
- Region: Oriental
- Province: Nador

Population (2024)
  - Total: 5,366
- Time zone: UTC+0 (GMT)

Bni Sidel Louta (Tarifit: ⴱⵏⵉ ⵙⵉⴷⴰⵍ ⵍⵓⵟⴰ, Arabic: بني سيدال لوطا) is a commune in the Nador Province of the Oriental administrative region of Morocco. At the time of the 2024 census, the commune had a total population of 5,366 people.
