= Tazouda Castle =

Historic building in Morocco

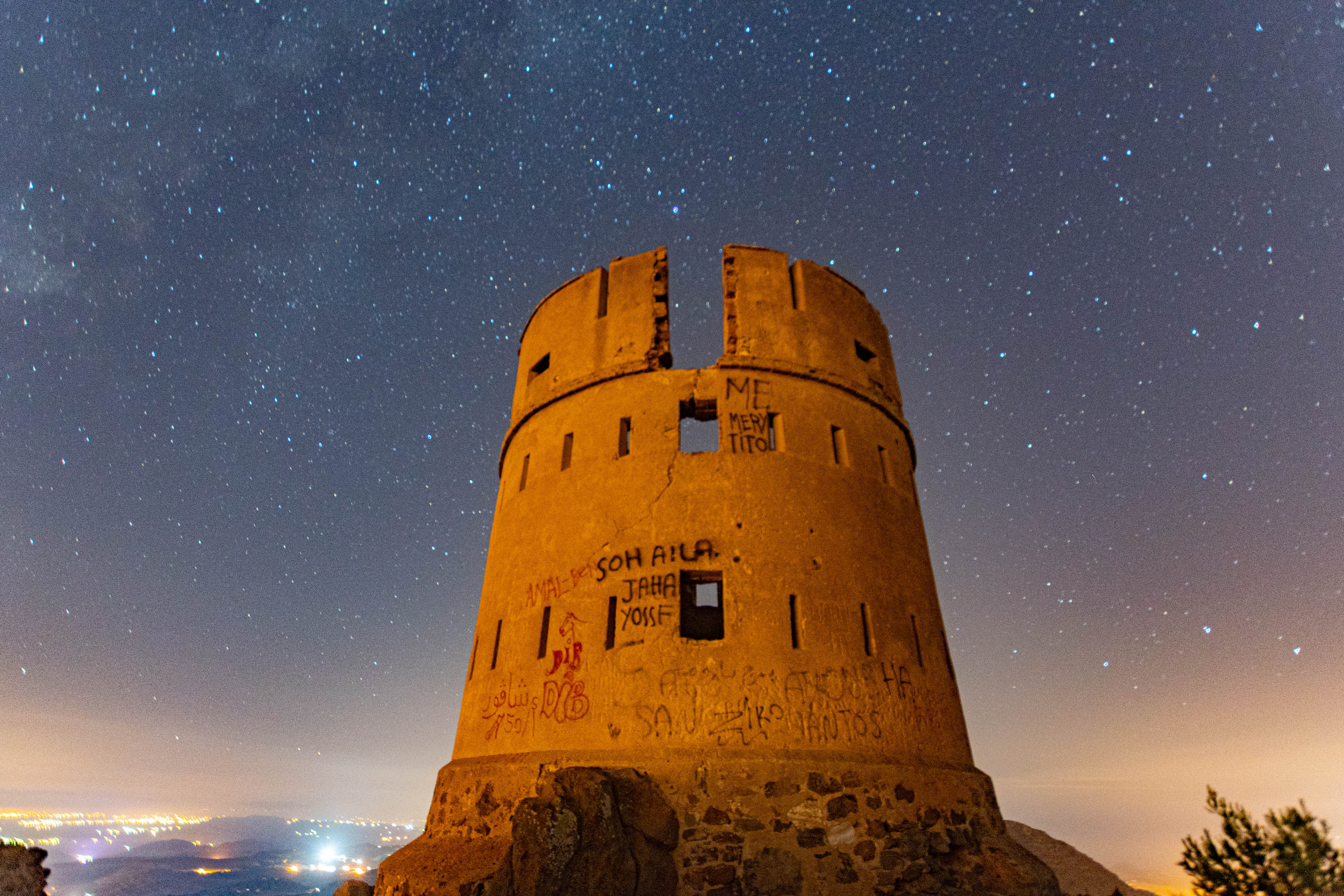
Tazouda (2020)

Tazouda (Arabic: تازوضا; Standard Moroccan Tamazight: ⵜⵥⵓⴹⴰ) or Tazuda is a ruined castle near Nador, Morocco. It is located on Mount Gurugu in the eastern Rif Mountains at an elevation of approximately 600 metres.

== History ==
According to Ibn Khaldun, it was originally built by the Marinids. However other sources reference to it before the 13. century as Qalʿat Ŷāra. According to A. Ghirelli, the fortress was already in existence by the 9th century and belonged to the Beni Urtedi, a Berber group inhabiting the region. Around 889, it was surrendered to the general of the Banū Ṣāliḥ of Nakūr as a sign of submission. By around 1067, however, it had come under the control of the Idrisids, whose rule over the region around Tazouda was short-lived. In 1081, the Almoravid ruler Yusuf ibn Tashfin occupied Guercil, Melilla, and the Rif, and destroyed the city of Nakūr. Ghirelli further states that, although the contemporary sources do not explicitly mention it, the Qalʿat Ŷāra referred was also destroyed.

During the Marinid period, Tazouda became a strategic stronghold against the rebellious Wattasids. Ibn Khaldun described it as one of the most impregnable fortresses in the Maghreb. After the Wattasids briefly captured it in 1293, the Marinid emir Abu Yaʿqub recaptured and destroyed the fortress to prevent the rebels from resettling there.

After the capture of Melilla Tazouda became the refuge of Moors exiled from Granada.

In the 16th century, Leo Africanus and Luis del Mármol Carvajal reported that a captain from Granada asked the Sultan of Fez to rebuild the fortress to counter the Spanish conquest of Ghassasa in 1506.

The surviving tower ruins are of later Spanish construction.

== Name ==
The etymology of the name Tazouda is uncertain. It is nevertheless considered to be of Berber origin.

Tazouda means plate in Tarifit.
