= Bni Sidel Jbel =

Bni Sidel Jbel Ait Sider ⴱⵏⵉ ⵙⵉⴷⴰⵍ ⵊⴱⴻⵍ
- commune
- Interactive map of Bni Sidel Jbel
- Coordinates: 35.185°N 3.048056°W
- Country: Morocco
- Region: Oriental
- Province: Nador

Area
  - Total: 70.01 km^{2} (27.03 sq mi)

Population (2024)
  - Total: 8,199
  - Density: 117.1/km^{2} (303/sq mi)
- Time zone: UTC+0 (GMT)

Bni Sidel Jbel (Riffian-Berber: ⴱⵏⵉ ⵙⵉⴷⴰⵍ ⵊⴱⴻⵍ, Arabic: بني سيدال الجبل) is a commune in the Nador Province of the Oriental administrative region of Morocco. At the time of the 2024 census, the commune had a total population of 8199 people.
