= Selouane =

Selouane سلوان Serouane ⵙⵍⵡⴰⵏ
- Town
- Interactive map of Selouane
- Coordinates: 35°04′N 2°56′W
- Country: Morocco
- Region: Oriental
- Province: Nador Province

Area
  - Total: 13.14 sq mi (34.03 km^{2})

Population (2024)
  - Total: 29,628
  - Density: 2,254/sq mi (870.4/km^{2})
- Time zone: UTC+0 (GMT)

Selouane (Arabic: سلوان, Tarifit: ⵙⵍⵡⴰⵏ) is a town in Nador Province, Oriental, Morocco. According to the 2024 census, it has a population of 29,628.

In maps of the 19. century it is called Iselouan.
