= Iksane =

Iksane إيكسان ⵉⴽⵙⴰⵏ
- commune
- Interactive map of Iksane
- Coordinates: 35°08′N 3°02′W
- Country: Morocco
- Region: Oriental
- Province: Nador

Area
  - Total: 55.03 km^{2} (21.25 sq mi)

Population (2024)
  - Total: 7,731
  - Density: 140.5/km^{2} (364/sq mi)
- Time zone: UTC+0 (GMT)

Iksane (Tarifit: ⵉⴽⵙⴰⵏ; Arabic: إيكسان) is a commune in the Nador Province of the Oriental administrative region of Morocco. At the time of the 2024 census, the commune had a total population of 7,731 people.
