= Hassi Berkane =

Coordinates: 34°50′N 2°52′W

Hassi Berkane حاسي بركان ⵃⴰⵙⵉ ⴱⴰⵔⴽⴰⵏ
- commune
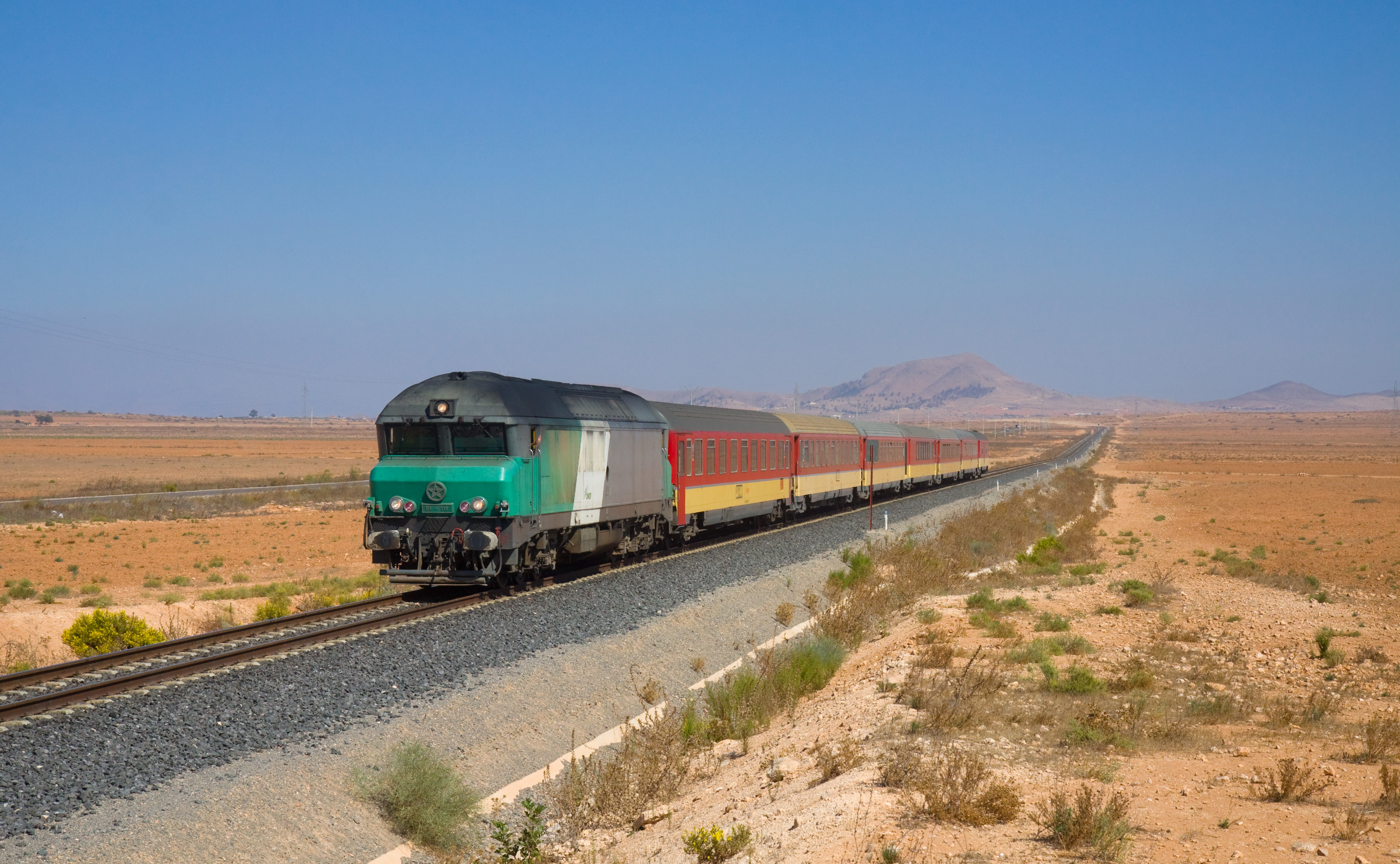
- Interactive map of Hassi Berkane
- Country: Morocco
- Region: Oriental
- Province: Nador

Population (2024)
  - Total: 7,465
- Time zone: UTC+0 (GMT)

Hassi Berkane (Tarifit: ⵃⴰⵙⵉ ⴱⴰⵔⴽⴰⵏ; Arabic: حاسي بركان) is a commune in the Nador Province of the Oriental administrative region of Morocco. At the time of the 2024 census, the commune had a total population of 7,465 people.
