= Zaio =

Zaio زايو
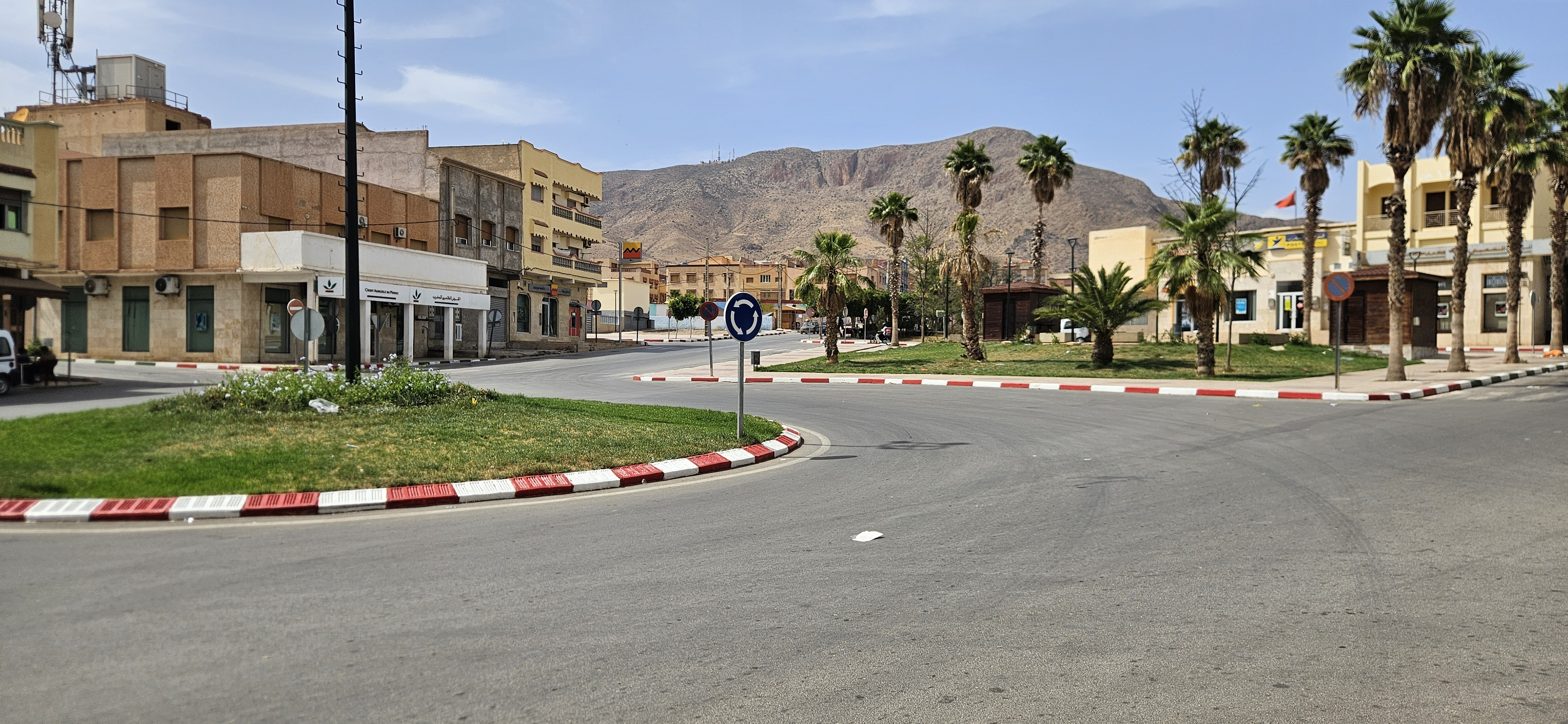

- Location in Morocco Zaio (Africa)
- Coordinates: 34°56′N 2°44′W
- Country: Morocco
- Region: Oriental
- Province: Nador

Population (2024)
  - Total: 36,766
- Time zone: UTC+0 (GMT)

Zaio (Arabic: زايو) is a municipality located in the province of Nador in northeastern Morocco. In 2024 Zaio had a total population of 36,766.
