= Marchica, Morocco =

Lagoon in Morocco

Coordinates: 35°09′N 2°51′W

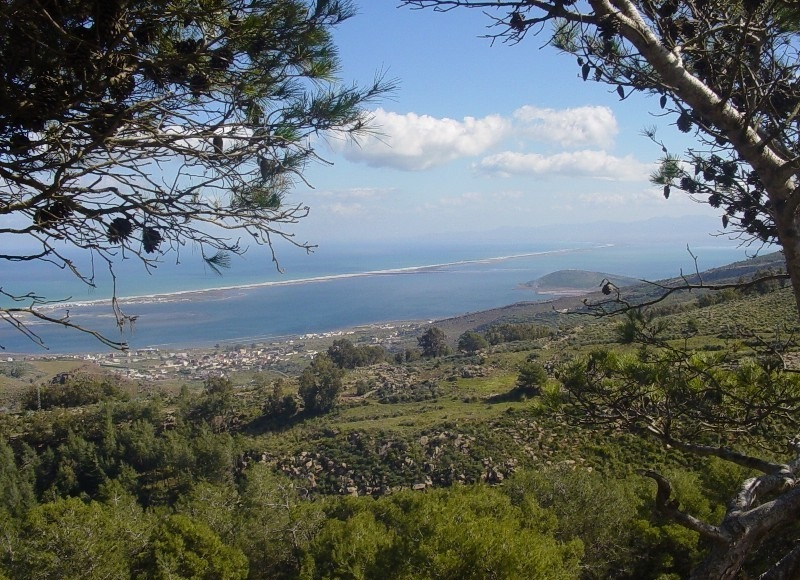
Lake Marchica

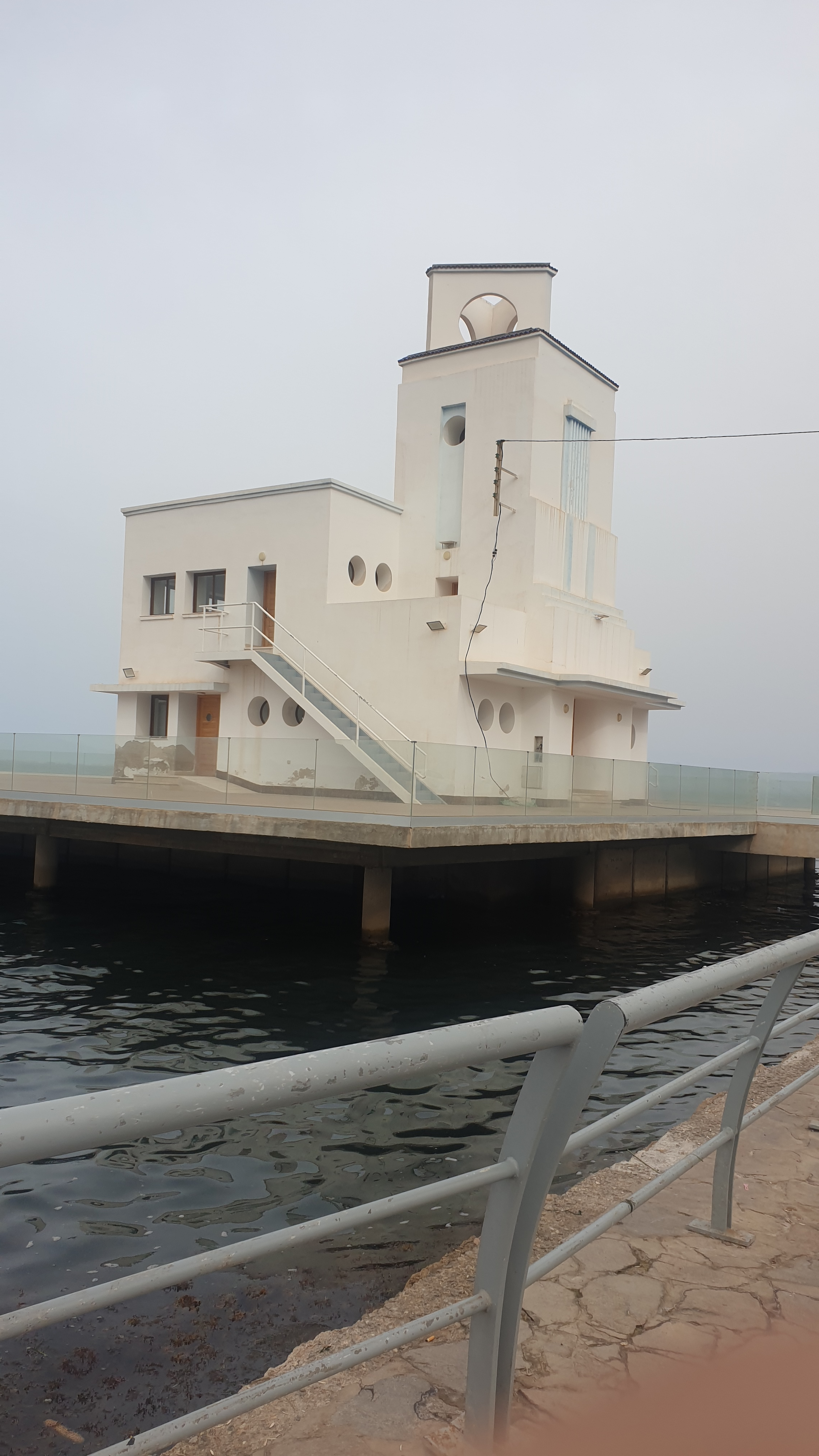
Marchica Lighthouse in Nador (Club)

Marchica, also known as Sebkha Bou Areg, is a lagoon in northern Morocco, adjacent to the city of Nador.

Marchica is of great importance from an environmental, economic and natural perspective, as it borders the cities of Nador and Beni Ansar and the village of Arkaman in the Nador province in the Rif region. Lake Marchica has an area of 120 square kilometres (46 sq mi), a depth of 0.5 to 7 metres (1 ft 8 in to 23 ft 0 in), and a length of 24 kilometres (15 mi).
