= Iaazzanene =

Iaazzanene إعزانن ⵉⵄⴰⵣⴰⵏⴻⵏ
- commune
- Interactive map of Iaazzanene
- Coordinates: 35.254444°N 3.115°W
- Country: Morocco
- Region: Oriental
- Province: Nador

Area
  - Total: 75.46 km^{2} (29.14 sq mi)

Population (2024)
  - Total: 12,706
  - Density: 168.4/km^{2} (436/sq mi)
- Time zone: UTC+0 (GMT)

Iaazzanène (Tarifit: ⵉⵄⴰⵣⴰⵏⴻⵏ; Arabic: إعزانن) is a commune in the Nador Province of the Oriental administrative region of Morocco. At the time of the 2024 census, the commune had a total population of 12,706 people.
