= Nador Province =

Coordinates: 35°10′42″N 2°55′51″W

Nador Province ⵜⴰⵙⴳⴰ ⵏ ⵏⵏⴰⴹⵓⵕ (Standard Moroccan Tamazight) إقليم الناظور (Arabic)
- Province
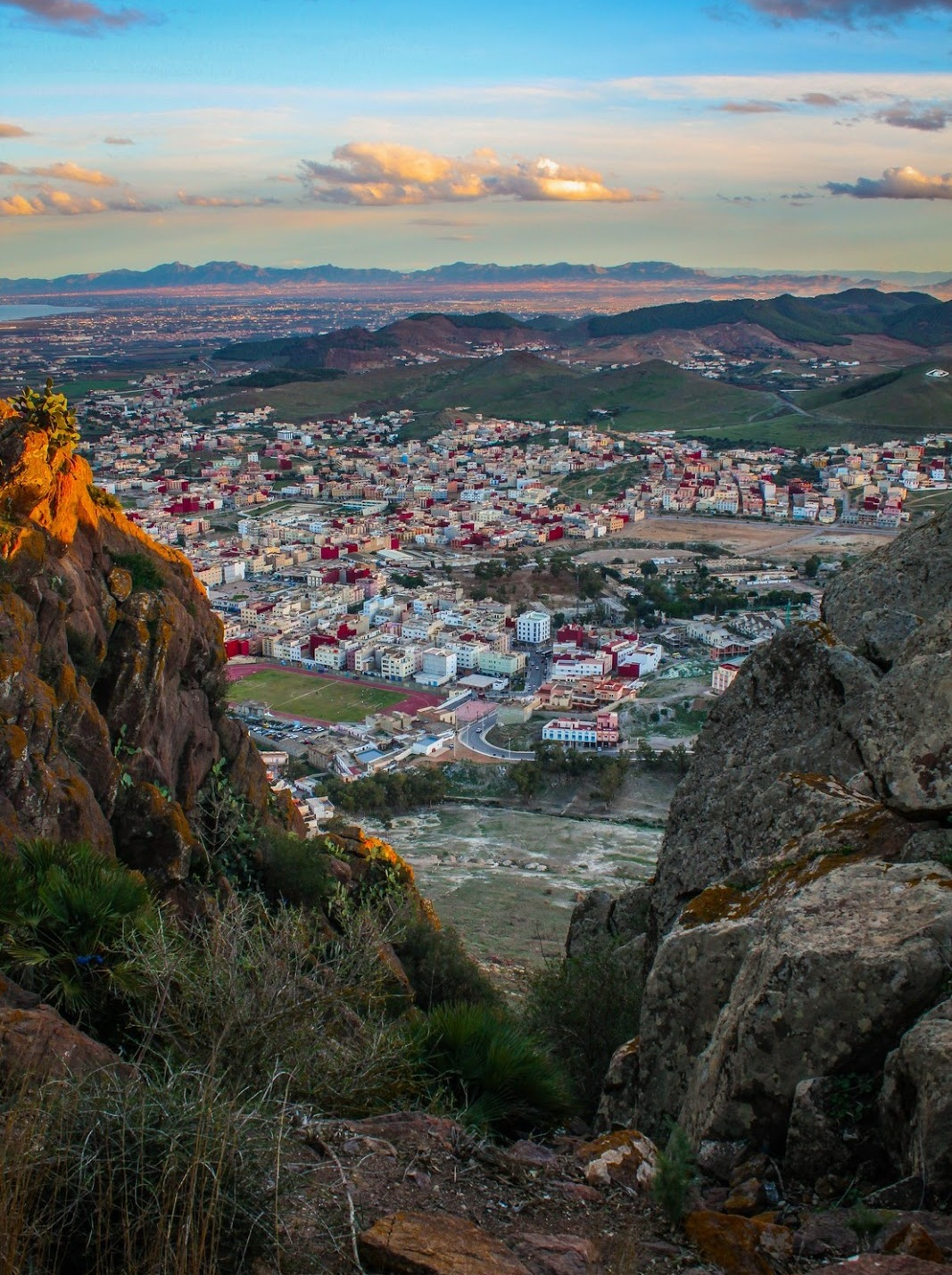
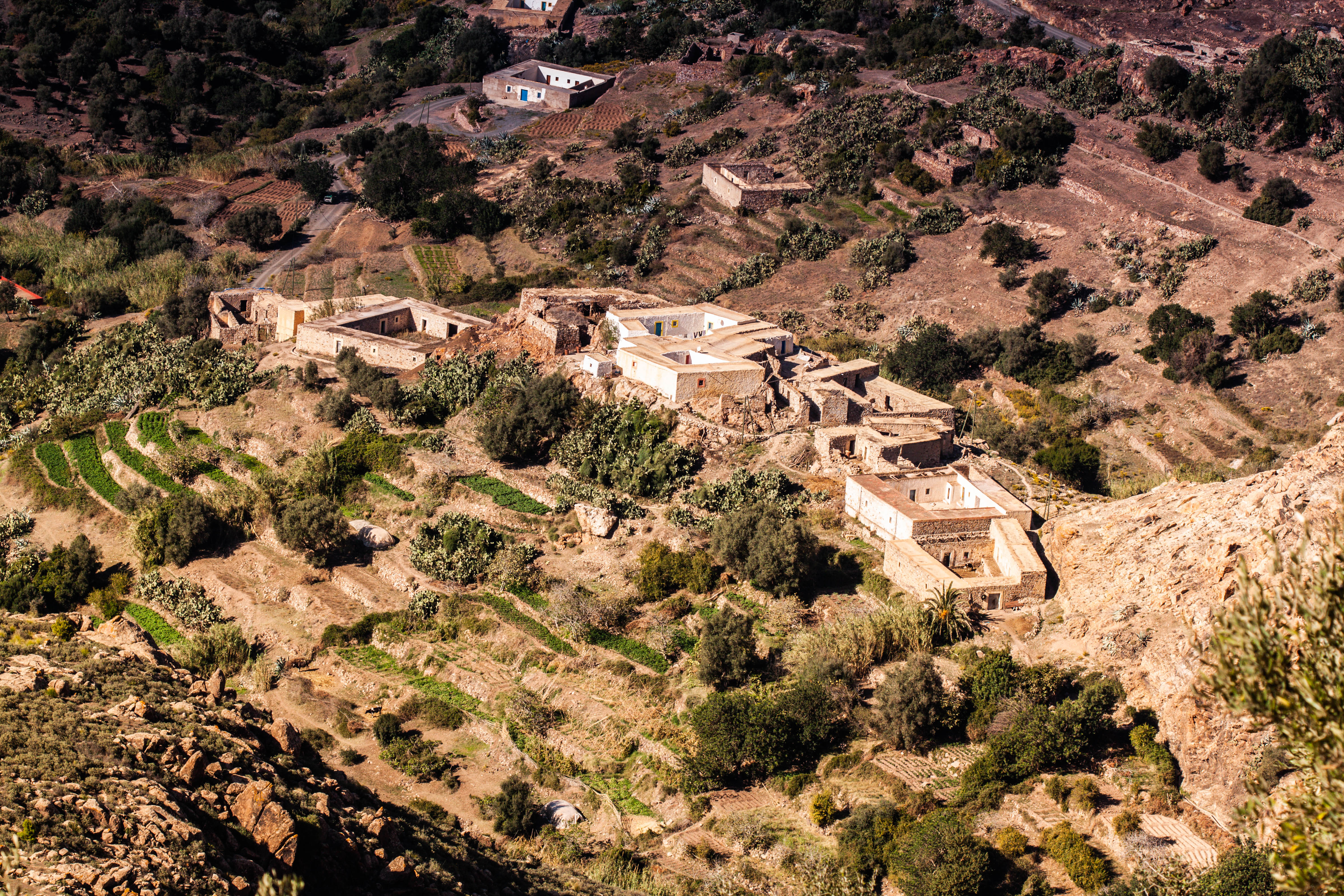

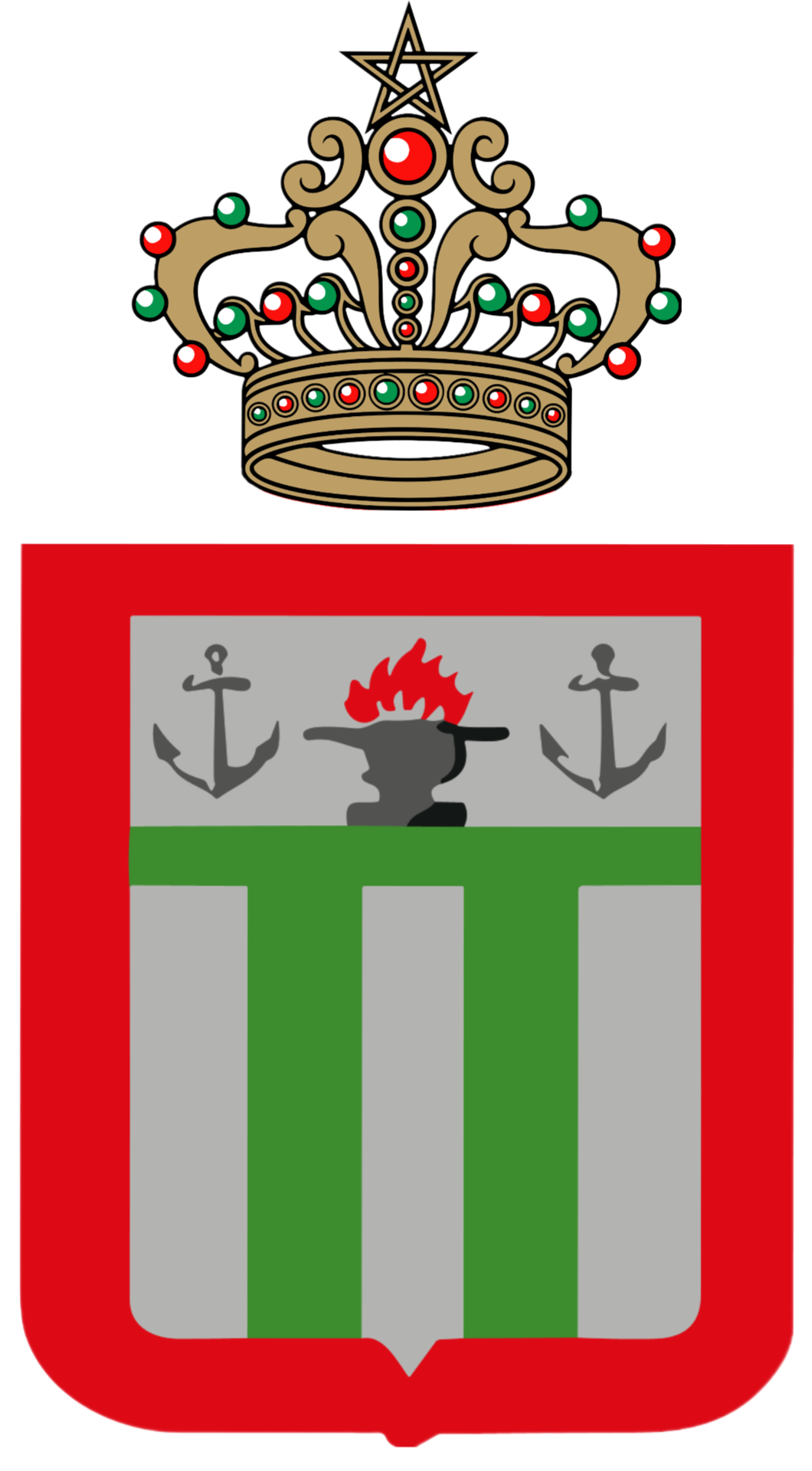
- Seal
- Interactive map of Nador Province
- Country: Morocco
- Region: Oriental
- Capital: Nador

Population (2024)
  - Total: 565,987

Nador Province (Note: Standard Moroccan Tamazight: ⵜⴰⵙⴳⴰ ⵏ ⵏⴰⴹⵓⵕ Arabic: الناظور) is a province in the Oriental Region of Morocco. Its capital is Nador. According to the 2024 census, it had a population of 565,987.

The province is located in northeastern Morocco, along the Mediterranean coast. It borders Driouch Province to the west, Berkane Province to the east, and the Mediterranean Sea to the north.

== History ==
The territory of present-day Nador Province has a long history linked to its coastal position in the eastern Rif region. Among its notable historical sites are the ruins of the medieval city of Cazaza, which played a role in regional trade and defense. There are also medieval and modern ruins like the Tazouda Castle, the Fort of Basbel and the Qaâla Ifras Taqdimt (The old Castle).

In the north of the province lies Cape Tres Forcas, the site of numerous battles, including the Battle of Tres Forcas. Another notable engagement was the Battle of Wolf Ravine during the Second Melillan campaign, fought between Riffian forces led by Mohamed Ameziane and Spanish troops.

== Geography ==
Nador Province lies in the eastern part of the Rif and includes both coastal and inland areas. The region is characterized by a Mediterranean climate with mild, wet winters and hot, dry summers. The province includes important lagoons and coastal zones, notably Marchica Lagoon near the city of Nador and Cape Three Forks.

Mount Gurugu, a 900-meter-high mountain, is located here.

== Infrastructure ==
The port of Nador West Med is under construction in Nador Province. It is planned to have an container component with a The port of Nador West Med is under construction in Nador Province. It is planned to have an initial capacity of 3 million TEU.

== Major cities and towns ==
The main cities and towns of the province include:

- Al Aaroui
- Beni Ensar
- Bni Chiker
- Farkhana
- Ihddaden
- Jaadar
- Kariat Arekmane
- Nador
- Ras El Ma
- Zeghanghane
- Selouane
- Tiztoutine
- Zaio

== Subdivisions ==
Communes of Nador Province

The province is divided administratively into the following:

Name	Geographic code	Type	Population (2024)	Notes
Al Aaroui	381.01.01.	Municipality	46,540	
Beni Ansar	381.01.03.	Municipality	50,508	
Nador	381.01.05.	Municipality	158,202	
Zaio	381.01.07.	Municipality	36,766	
Zeghanghane	381.01.09.	Municipality	31,431	
Ras El Ma	381.01.15.	Rural commune	7,527	
Selouane	381.01.19.	Rural commune	29,628	
Bni Bouifrour	381.05.01.	Rural commune	6,846	
Bni Chiker	381.05.03.	Rural commune	22,763	4,825 residents live in the center, called Bni Chiker; 17,938 residents live in rural areas.
Bni Sidel Jbel	381.05.05.	Rural commune	8,199	
Bni Sidel Louta	381.05.07.	Rural commune	5,366	
Bouarg	381.05.09.	Rural commune	44,626	
Iaazzanene	381.05.13.	Rural commune	12,706	
Ihaddadene	381.05.15.	Rural commune	15,667	13,763 residents live in the center, called Bouizazarene Ihaddadene; 1,904 residents live in rural areas.
Iksane	381.05.17.	Rural commune	7,731	
Afsou	381.07.01.	Rural commune	2,020	
Al Barkanyene	381.07.03.	Rural commune	2,278	
Arekmane	381.07.05.	Rural commune	16,477	4,602 residents live in the center, called Kariat Arekmane; 11,875 residents live in rural areas.
Bni Oukil Oulad M'Hand	381.07.07.	Rural commune	14,691	
Hassi Berkane	381.07.09.	Rural commune	7,465	
Oulad Daoud Zkhanine	381.07.11.	Rural commune	3,149	
Oulad Settout	381.07.13.	Rural commune	26,052	
Tiztoutine	381.07.17.	Rural commune	9,349	4,586 residents live in the center, called Tiztoutine; 4,763 residents live in rural areas.
