= ISO 3166-2:MA =

Entry for Morocco in ISO 3166-2

ISO 3166-2:MA is the entry for Morocco in ISO 3166-2, part of the ISO 3166 standard published by the International Organization for Standardization (ISO), which defines codes for the names of the principal subdivisions (e.g., provinces or states) of all countries coded in ISO 3166-1.

Currently for Morocco, ISO 3166-2 codes are defined for two levels of subdivisions:

- 12 regions
- 62 provinces and 13 prefectures

Each code consists of two parts, separated by a hyphen. The first part is MA, the ISO 3166-1 alpha-2 code of Morocco. The second part is either of the following:

- two digits (01–12): regions
- three letters: provinces and prefectures

The codes for the regions are assigned roughly from north to south.

== Current codes ==
Subdivision names are listed as in the ISO 3166-2 standard published by the ISO 3166 Maintenance Agency (ISO 3166/MA).

Click on the button in the header to sort each column.

=== Regions ===
Code	Subdivision name (ar)	Subdivision name (ar) (Note: For reference only, Arabic name in Arabic script not included in the ISO 3166-2 standard.)
MA-05	Béni Mellal-Khénifra	بني ملال - خنيفرة
MA-06	Casablanca-Settat	الدار البيضاء - سطات
MA-12	Dakhla-Oued Ed-Dahab (EH)	الداخلة - وادي الذهب
MA-08	Drâa-Tafilalet	درعة - تافيلالت
MA-03	Fès-Meknès	جهة فاس مكناس
MA-10	Guelmim-Oued Noun (EH-partial)	ڭلميم-وادي نون
MA-02	L'Oriental	جهة الشرق
MA-11	Laâyoune-Sakia El Hamra (EH-partial)	العيون - الساقية الحمراء
MA-07	Marrakech-Safi	مراكش آسفي
MA-04	Rabat-Salé-Kénitra	الرباط-سلا-القنيطرة
MA-09	Souss-Massa	سوس ماسة
MA-01	Tanger-Tétouan-Al Hoceïma	طنجة - تطوان - الحسيمة

=== Provinces and prefectures ===
Code	Subdivision name (ar)	Subdivision name (ar)	Subdivision category	In region
MA-AGD	Agadir-Ida-Ou-Tanane	أكادير	prefecture	09
MA-HAO	Al Haouz	إقليم الحوز	province	07
MA-HOC	Al Hoceïma	الحسيمة	province	01
MA-AOU	Aousserd (EH)	أوسرد	province	12
MA-ASZ	Assa-Zag (EH-partial)	آسا الزاك	province	10
MA-AZI	Azilal	أزيلال	province	05
MA-BEM	Béni Mellal	بني ملال	province	05
MA-BES	Benslimane	بنسليمان	province	06
MA-BER	Berkane	بَركان	province	02
MA-BRR	Berrechid	برشيد	province	06
MA-BOD	Boujdour (EH)	بوجدور	province	11
MA-BOM	Boulemane	بولمان	province	03
MA-CAS	Casablanca (Local variant: Dar el Beïda)	الدار البيضاء	prefecture	06
MA-CHE	Chefchaouen	شفشاون	province	01
MA-CHI	Chichaoua	شيشاوة	province	07
MA-CHT	Chtouka-Ait Baha	اشتوكة أيت باها	province	06
MA-DRI	Driouch	الدريوش	province	02
MA-HAJ	El Hajeb	الحاجب	province	03
MA-JDI	El Jadida	الجديدة	province	06
MA-KES	El Kelâa des Sraghna	قلعة السراغنة	province	07
MA-ERR	Errachidia	الراشيدية	province	08
MA-ESM	Es-Semara (EH-partial)	السمارة	province	11
MA-ESI	Essaouira	الصويرة	province	07
MA-FAH	Fahs-Anjra	الفحص أنجرة	province	01
MA-FES	Fès	فاس	prefecture	03
MA-FIG	Figuig	فكيك	province	02
MA-FQH	Fquih Ben Salah	الفقيه بن صالح	province	05
MA-GUE	Guelmim	كلميم	province	10
MA-GUF	Guercif	جرسيف	province	02
MA-IFR	Ifrane	افران	province	03
MA-INE	Inezgane-Ait Melloul	إنزكان أيت ملول	prefecture	09
MA-JRA	Jerada	جرادة	province	02
MA-KEN	Kénitra	القنيطرة	province	04
MA-KHE	Khémisset	الخميسات	province	04
MA-KHN	Khénifra	خنيفرة	province	05
MA-KHO	Khouribga	خريبكة	province	05
MA-LAA	Laâyoune (EH)	العيون	province	11
MA-LAR	Larache	العرائش	province	01
MA-MDF	M’diq-Fnideq	المضيق - الفنيدق	prefecture	01
MA-MAR	Marrakech	مراكش	prefecture	07
MA-MED	Médiouna	مديونة	province	06
MA-MEK	Meknès	مكناس	prefecture	03
MA-MID	Midelt	ميدلت	province	08
MA-MOH	Mohammadia	المحمدية	prefecture	06
MA-MOU	Moulay Yacoub	مولاي يعقوب	province	03
MA-NAD	Nador	الناظور	province	02
MA-NOU	Nouaceur	النواصر	province	04
MA-OUA	Ouarzazate	ورزازات	province	08
MA-OUD	Oued Ed-Dahab (EH)	وادي الذهب	province	12
MA-OUZ	Ouezzane	وزان	province	01
MA-OUJ	Oujda-Angad	وجدة-أنكاد	prefecture	02
MA-RAB	Rabat	الرباط	prefecture	04
MA-REH	Rehamna	الرحامنة	province	07
MA-SAF	Safi	آسفي	province	07
MA-SAL	Salé	سلا	prefecture	04
MA-SEF	Sefrou	صفرو	province	03
MA-SET	Settat	سطات	province	06
MA-SIB	Sidi Bennour	سيدي بنور	province	06
MA-SIF	Sidi Ifni	سيدي إفني	province	10
MA-SIK	Sidi Kacem	سيدي قاسم	province	04
MA-SIL	Sidi Slimane	سيدي سليمان	province	04
MA-SKH	Skhirate-Témara	الصخيرات تمارة	prefecture	04
MA-TNT	Tan-Tan (EH-partial)	طانطان	province	10
MA-TNG	Tanger-Assilah	طنجة أصيلة	prefecture	01
MA-TAO	Taounate	تاونات	province	03
MA-TAI	Taourirt	تاوريرت	province	02
MA-TAF	Tarfaya (EH-partial)	طرفاية	province	11
MA-TAR	Taroudannt	تارودانت	province	09
MA-TAT	Tata	طاطا	province	09
MA-TAZ	Taza	تازة	province	03
MA-TET	Tétouan	تطوان	province	01
MA-TIN	Tinghir	تنغير	province	08
MA-TIZ	Tiznit	تيزنيت	province	09
MA-YUS	Youssoufia	اليوسفية	province	07
MA-ZAG	Zagora	زاكورة	province	08

== Subdivisions located in Western Sahara ==
The following regions, provinces and prefectures are located in the disputed territory of Western Sahara:

- MA-12 Dakhla-Oued Ed-Dahab (entirely in Western Sahara)
  - MA-AOU Aousserd (entirely in Western Sahara)
  - MA-OUD Oued Ed-Dahab (entirely in Western Sahara)
- MA-10 Guelmim-Oued Noun (partially in Western Sahara)
  - MA-ASZ Assa-Zag (partially in Western Sahara)
  - MA-TNT Tan-Tan (partially in Western Sahara)
- MA-11 Laâyoune-Sakia El Hamra (partially in Western Sahara)
  - MA-BOD Boujdour (entirely in Western Sahara)
  - MA-ESM Es-Semara (partially in Western Sahara)
  - MA-LAA Laâyoune (entirely in Western Sahara)
  - MA-TAF Tarfaya (partially in Western Sahara)

== Changes ==
The following changes to the entry have been announced by the ISO 3166/MA since the first publication of ISO 3166-2 in 1998:

Source	Date issued	Description of change	Code/Subdivision change
Newsletter I-2	2002-05-21	New subdivision layout at economic region level. List source updated. Addition of one reference in the code source. Two name spellings corrected. One code corrected	Subdivision layout: 7 economic regions (see below) → 16 economic regions (now called regions); Code changes: Jerada: MA-IRA → MA-JRA
Newsletter I-6	2004-03-08	Change of spelling for Laâyoune	
Newsletter II-1	2010-02-03 (corrected 2010-02-19)	Addition of the country code prefix as the first code element, addition of names in administrative languages	Subdivisions added: MA-AOU Aousserd; MA-FAH Fahs-Anjra; MA-MED Médiouna; MA-MMD Marrakech-Medina; MA-MMN Marrakech-Menara; MA-MOH Mohammadia; MA-MOU Moulay Yacoub; MA-NOU Nouaceur; MA-RAB Rabat; MA-SAL Salé; MA-SKH Skhirate-Témara; MA-SYB Sidi Youssef Ben Ali; MA-TAI Taourirt; MA-ZAG Zagora; Subdivisions deleted: MA-MAR Marrakech; MA-RBA Rabat-Salé; Code changes: MA-BAH Aït Baha → MA-CHT Chtouka-Ait Baha; MA-MEL Aït Melloul → MA-INE Inezgane-Ait Melloul
Online Browsing Platform (OBP)	2014-11-03	Change spelling of MA-14; update List Source	
Online Browsing Platform (OBP)	2018-04-20	Modification of remark part 2; deletion of regions MA-01 to MA-16; addition of new regions MA-01 to MA-12; change of spelling of MA-AGD, MA-BES, MA-ESM, MA-FAH, MA-FES, MA-JRA, MA-KES, MA-OUD; change of category name from prefecture to province for MA-AOU, MA-FAH, MA-TET; addition of prefectures MA-MAR, MA-MDF; deletion of prefectures, MA-MMD, MA-MMN, MA-SYB; addition of provinces MA-BRR, MA-DRI, MA-FQH, MA-GUF, MA-MID, MA-OUZ, MA-REH, MA-SIF, MA-SIL, MA-SIB, MA-TAF, MA-TIN, MA-YUS; change of parent subdivision for MA-AGD, MA-AOU, MA-FES, MA-INE, MA-MEK, MA-MOH, MA-OUJ, MA-RAB, MA-SAL, MA-SKH, MA-ASZ, MA-AZI, MA-BEM, MA-BER, MA-BES, MA-BOD, MA-BOM, MA-CHI, MA-CHT, MA-ERR, MA-ESI, MA-ESM, MA-FIG, MA-GUE, MA-HAJ, MA-HAO, MA-HOC, MA-IFR, MA-JDI, MA-JRA, MA-KEN, MA-KES, MA-KHE, MA-KHN, MA-KHO, MA-LAA, MA-MED, MA-MOU, MA-NAD, MA-NOU, MA-OUA, MA-OUD, MA-SAF, MA-SEF, MA-SET, MA-SIK, MA-TAI, MA-TAR, MA-TAT, MA-TIZ, MA-TNT, MA-ZAG; addition of (EH) to MA-LAA; addition of (EH-partial) to MA-ASZ, MA-TNT; update List Source	Subdivisions deleted: MA-01 - MA-16; MA-MDF; MA-MMD; MA-MMN; MA-SYB; Subdivisions added: MA-01 - MA-12; MA-BRR; MA-DRI; MA-FQH; MA-GUF; MA-MAR; MA-MID; MA-OUZ; MA-REH; MA-SIB; MA-SIF; MA-SIL; MA-TAF; MA-TIN; MA-YUS; Category changes: MA-AOU prefecture → province MA-FAH prefecture → province MA-TET prefecture → province Parent changes: MA-AGD MA-13 → MA-09; MA-AOU MA-16 → MA-12; MA-ASZ MA-14 → MA-10; MA-AZI MA-12 → MA-05; MA-BEM MA-12 → MA-05; MA-BER MA-04 → MA-02; MA-BES MA-09 → MA-06; MA-BOD MA-15 → MA-11; MA-BOM MA-05 → MA-03; MA-CHI MA-11 → MA-07; MA-CHT MA-13 → MA-06; MA-ERR MA-06 → MA-08; MA-ESI MA-11 → MA-07; MA-ESM MA-14 → MA-11; MA-FES MA-05 → MA-03; MA-FIG MA-04 → MA-02; MA-GUE MA-14 → MA-10; MA-HAJ MA-06 → MA-03; MA-HAO MA-11 → MA-07; MA-HOC MA-03 → MA-01; MA-IFR MA-06 → MA-03; MA-INE MA-13 → MA-09; MA-JDI MA-10 → MA-06; MA-JRA MA-04 → MA-02; MA-KEN MA-02 → MA-04; MA-KES MA-11 → MA-07; MA-KHE MA-07 → MA-04; MA-KHN MA-06 → MA-05; MA-KHO MA-09 → MA-05; MA-LAA MA-15 → MA-11; MA-MED MA-08 → MA-06; MA-MEK MA-06 → MA-03; MA-MOH MA-08 → MA-06; MA-MOU MA-05 → MA-03; MA-NAD MA-04 → MA-02; MA-NOU MA-08 → MA-04; MA-OUA MA-13 → MA-08; MA-OUD MA-16 → MA-12; MA-OUJ MA-04 → MA-02; MA-RAB MA-07 → MA-04; MA-SAF MA-10 → MA-07; MA-SAL MA-07 → MA-04; MA-SEF MA-05 → MA-03; MA-SET MA-09 → MA-08; MA-SIK MA-02 → MA-06; MA-SKH MA-07 → MA-04; MA-TAI MA-04 → MA-02; MA-TAR MA-13 → MA-09; MA-TAT MA-14 → MA-09; MA-TIZ MA-13 → MA-09; MA-TNT MA-14 → MA-10; MA-ZAG MA-13 → MA-08
Online Browsing Platform (OBP)	2018-11-26	Change of spelling of MA-05; Change of (EH) to (EH-partial) for MA-ESM; Correction of the romanization system label	Spelling change: MA-05 Béni-Mellal-Khénifra → Béni Mellal-Khénifra; Location change: MA-ESM Es-Semara (EH) → Es-Semara (EH-partial)
Online Browsing Platform (OBP)	2019-04-09	Correction of parent subdivision of MA-CAS, MA-SET, MA-SIK; Typographical correction of MA-03	Parent changes: MA-CAS MA-08 → MA-06; MA-SET MA-08 → MA-06; MA-SIK MA-06 → MA-04; Spelling change: MA-03 Fès- Meknès → Fès-Meknès
Online Browsing Platform (OBP)	2020-11-24	Change of spelling of MA-KHE, MA-KHN, MA-TAR; Deletion of an asterisk of the local variation of MA-CAS; Update List Source	Spelling change: MA-KHE Khemisset → Khémisset; MA-KHN Khenifra → Khénifra; MA-TAR Taroudant → Taroudannt

=== Codes before Newsletter I-2 ===
Former code	Subdivision name	Wilayas and provinces in economic region
MA-CE	Centre	AZI, BEM, BES, BOM, CAS, JDI, KHO, SET
MA-CN	Centre-Nord	HOC, FES, SEF, TAO, TAZ
MA-CS	Centre-Sud	HAJ, ERR, IFR, KHN, MEK
MA-ES	Est	BER, FIG, JRA, NAD, OUJ
MA-NO	Nord-Ouest	CHE, KEN, KHE, LAR, RBA, SIK, TNG, TET
MA-SU	Sud	AGD, BAH, MEL, ASZ, BOD, ESM, GUE, LAA, OUA, OUD, TNT, TAR, TAT, TIZ
MA-TS	Tensift	HAO, CHI, ESI, KES, MAR, SAF

== See also ==
- FIPS region codes of Morocco
- Subdivisions of Morocco
- Neighbouring countries: DZ, EH, ES
