= List of administrative divisions of Morocco by population =

This is a list of the second-level administrative divisions of the Kingdom of Morocco including all provinces and prefectures in descending order of their total populations as per the Census Report of 2004.

Population in 2014

Rank	Administrative Division	Population	Region
-	Morocco	33,610,084	-
1	Casablanca Prefecture	3,343,642	Casablanca-Settat
2	Marrakech Prefecture	1,323,005	Marrakech-Safi
3	Fez Prefecture	1,146,088	Fez-Meknes
4	Tanger-Assilah Prefecture	1,060,261	Tangier-Tetouan-Al Hoceima
5	Kénitra Province	1,052,177	Rabat-Salé-Kénitra
6	Salé Prefecture	973,418	Rabat-Salé-Kénitra
7	Taroudant Province	834,907	Souss-Massa
8	Meknès Prefecture	827,479	Fez-Meknes
9	El Jadida Province	786,716	Casablanca-Settat
10	Safi Province	691,983	Marrakech-Safi
11	Taounate Province	660,736	Fez-Meknes
12	Settat Province	631,725	Casablanca-Settat
13	Agadir-Ida Ou Tanane Prefecture	598,757	Souss-Massa
14	Rabat Prefecture	572,717	Rabat-Salé-Kénitra
15	Skhirate-Témara Prefecture	572,170	Rabat-Salé-Kénitra
16	Al Haouz Province	571,999	Marrakech-Safi
17	Nador Province	561,070	Oriental
18	Azilal Province	552,884	Béni Mellal-Khénifra
19	Oujda-Angad Province	549,615	Oriental
20	Béni Mellal Province	548,776	Béni Mellal-Khénifra
21	Tétouan Prefecture	547,177	Tangier-Tetouan-Al Hoceima
22	Khémisset Province	539,828	Rabat-Salé-Kénitra
23	Khouribga Province	538,325	Béni Mellal-Khénifra
24	El Kelâat Es-Sraghna Province	535,753	Marrakech-Safi
25	Inezgane-Aït Melloul Prefecture	534,525	Souss-Massa
26	Taza Province	526,986	Fez-Meknes
27	Sidi Kacem Province	522,070	Rabat-Salé-Kénitra
28	Fquih Ben Salah Province	502,212	Béni Mellal-Khénifra
29	Larache Province	495,030	Tangier-Tetouan-Al Hoceima
30	Berrechid Province	482,312	Casablanca-Settat
31	Chefchaouen Province	456,701	Tangier-Tetouan-Al Hoceima
32	Sidi Bennour Province	452,448	Casablanca-Settat
33	Essaouira Province	449,133	Marrakech-Safi
34	Errachidia Province	415,963	Drâa-Tafilalet
35	Mohammedia Prefecture	403,392	Casablanca-Settat
36	Al Hoceïma Province	397,708	Tangier-Tetouan-Al Hoceima
37	Khénifra Province	370,178	Béni Mellal-Khénifra
38	Chtouka-Aït Baha Province	369,777	Souss-Massa
39	Chichaoua Province	369,494	Marrakech-Safi
40	Nouaceur Province	325,651	Casablanca-Settat
41	Tinghir Province	321,184	Drâa-Tafilalet
42	Sidi Slimane Province	320,205	Rabat-Salé-Kénitra
43	Chichaoua Province	311,457	Marrakech-Safi
44	Zagora Province	305,510	Drâa-Tafilalet
45	Ouezzane Province	298,751	Tangier-Tetouan-Al Hoceima
46	Ouarzazate Province	295,622	Drâa-Tafilalet
47	Midelt Province	288,990	Drâa-Tafilalet
48	Berkane Province	287,977	Oriental
49	Sefrou Province	285,938	Fez-Meknes
50	Youssoufia Province	251,943	Marrakech-Safi
51	El Hajeb Province	246,173	Fez-Meknes
52	Taourirt Province	232,752	Oriental
53	Laâyoune Province	232,416	Laâyoune-Sakia El Hamra
54	Ben Slimane Province	229,065	Casablanca-Settat
55	Guercif Province	216,105	Oriental
56	Driouch Province	211,049	Oriental
57	M'Diq-Fnideq Prefecture	208,899	Tangier-Tetouan-Al Hoceima
58	Tiznit Province	205,182	Souss-Massa
59	Boulemane Province	197,475	Fez-Meknes
60	Guelmim Province	186,832	Guelmim-Oued Noun
61	Moulay Yacoub Prefecture	172,311	Fez-Meknes
62	Médiouna Province	171,822	Casablanca-Settat
63	Ifrane Province	153,771	Fez-Meknes
64	Figuig Province	135,603	Oriental
65	Sidi Ifni Province	115,055	Guelmim-Oued Noun
66	Tata Province	114,758	Souss-Massa
67	Oued Ed-Dahab Province	111,625	Dakhla-Oued Ed-Dahab
68	Jerada Province	108,011	Oriental
69	Tan-Tan Province	85,655	Guelmim-Oued Noun
70	Fahs Anjra Prefecture	75,485	Tangier-Tetouan-Al Hoceima
71	Es-Semara Province	50,864	Laâyoune-Sakia El Hamra
72	Boujdour Province	44,440	Laâyoune-Sakia El Hamra
73	Assa-Zag Province	26,947	Guelmim-Oued Noun
74	Tarfaya Province	13,028	Laâyoune-Sakia El Hamra
75	Aousserd Province	2,396	Dakhla-Oued Ed-Dahab
