= List of administrative divisions of Morocco by area =

This is a list of the administrative divisions of Morocco by area. The first table lists the country's 12 regions, while the second table lists the second-level administrative divisions, consisting of provinces and prefectures.

The tables use the post-2015 administrative division of Morocco. The 2015 territorial reform reorganized the country into 12 regions, replacing the former 16-region system.

== Regions ==
The 12 regions of Morocco

Rank	Region	Area (km²)
1	Dakhla-Oued Ed-Dahab	130,898
2	Laâyoune-Sakia El Hamra	104,018
3	Oriental	88,681
4	Drâa-Tafilalet	88,836
5	Souss-Massa	53,789
6	Guelmim-Oued Noun	46,108
7	Fès-Meknès	40,075
8	Marrakesh-Safi	39,167
9	Béni Mellal-Khénifra	28,374
10	Casablanca-Settat	19,448
11	Rabat-Salé-Kénitra	18,194
12	Tanger-Tétouan-Al Hoceïma	17,262

== Provinces and prefectures ==
Administrative division	Type	Region	Area (km²)
Oued Ed-Dahab Province	Province	Dakhla-Oued Ed-Dahab	76,948
Aousserd Province	Province	Dakhla-Oued Ed-Dahab	53,950
Laâyoune Province	Province	Laâyoune-Sakia El Hamra	34,139
Boujdour Province	Province	Laâyoune-Sakia El Hamra	43,753
Tarfaya Province	Province	Laâyoune-Sakia El Hamra	11,194
Es-Semara Province	Province	Laâyoune-Sakia El Hamra	61,055
Guelmim Province	Province	Guelmim-Oued Noun	10,783
Assa-Zag Province	Province	Guelmim-Oued Noun	27,000
Tan-Tan Province	Province	Guelmim-Oued Noun	17,295
Sidi Ifni Province	Province	Guelmim-Oued Noun	3,790
Agadir-Ida Ou Tanane Prefecture	Prefecture	Souss-Massa	2,297
Inezgane-Aït Melloul Prefecture	Prefecture	Souss-Massa	293
Chtouka-Aït Baha Province	Province	Souss-Massa	3,523
Taroudant Province	Province	Souss-Massa	16,460
Tiznit Province	Province	Souss-Massa	6,960
Tata Province	Province	Souss-Massa	25,925
Errachidia Province	Province	Drâa-Tafilalet	29,750
Midelt Province	Province	Drâa-Tafilalet	13,121
Ouarzazate Province	Province	Drâa-Tafilalet	12,432
Tinghir Province	Province	Drâa-Tafilalet	13,007
Zagora Province	Province	Drâa-Tafilalet	30,330
Marrakech Prefecture	Prefecture	Marrakesh-Safi	1,671
Chichaoua Province	Province	Marrakesh-Safi	6,872
Al Haouz Province	Province	Marrakesh-Safi	6,212
El Kelâa des Sraghna Province	Province	Marrakesh-Safi	4,048
Essaouira Province	Province	Marrakesh-Safi	6,335
Rehamna Province	Province	Marrakesh-Safi	5,877
Safi Province	Province	Marrakesh-Safi	3,633
Youssoufia Province	Province	Marrakesh-Safi	2,458
Casablanca Prefecture	Prefecture	Casablanca-Settat	873
Mohammedia Prefecture	Prefecture	Casablanca-Settat	34
El Jadida Province	Province	Casablanca-Settat	3,284
Nouaceur Province	Province	Casablanca-Settat	515
Médiouna Province	Province	Casablanca-Settat	234
Benslimane Province	Province	Casablanca-Settat	2,760
Berrechid Province	Province	Casablanca-Settat	2,530
Settat Province	Province	Casablanca-Settat	7,220
Sidi Bennour Province	Province	Casablanca-Settat	3,007
Béni Mellal Province	Province	Béni Mellal-Khénifra	2,075
Azilal Province	Province	Béni Mellal-Khénifra	9,800
Fquih Ben Salah Province	Province	Béni Mellal-Khénifra	3,250
Khénifra Province	Province	Béni Mellal-Khénifra	6,713
Khouribga Province	Province	Béni Mellal-Khénifra	4,250
Rabat Prefecture	Prefecture	Rabat-Salé-Kénitra	118
Salé Prefecture	Prefecture	Rabat-Salé-Kénitra	672
Skhirate-Témara Prefecture	Prefecture	Rabat-Salé-Kénitra	485
Kénitra Province	Province	Rabat-Salé-Kénitra	3,052
Khémisset Province	Province	Rabat-Salé-Kénitra	8,305
Sidi Kacem Province	Province	Rabat-Salé-Kénitra	3,113
Sidi Slimane Province	Province	Rabat-Salé-Kénitra	1,760
Fès Prefecture	Prefecture	Fès-Meknès	332
Meknès Prefecture	Prefecture	Fès-Meknès	1,786
El Hajeb Province	Province	Fès-Meknès	2,209
Ifrane Province	Province	Fès-Meknès	3,573
Moulay Yacoub Province	Province	Fès-Meknès	1,700
Sefrou Province	Province	Fès-Meknès	4,008
Boulemane Province	Province	Fès-Meknès	14,395
Taounate Province	Province	Fès-Meknès	5,585
Taza Province	Province	Fès-Meknès	7,101
Oujda-Angad Prefecture	Prefecture	Oriental	1,714
Nador Province	Province	Oriental	3,263
Driouch Province	Province	Oriental	2,867
Jerada Province	Province	Oriental	8,460
Berkane Province	Province	Oriental	1,985
Taourirt Province	Province	Oriental	8,541
Guercif Province	Province	Oriental	7,307
Figuig Province	Province	Oriental	55,990
Tanger-Assilah Prefecture	Prefecture	Tanger-Tétouan-Al Hoceïma	863
M'diq-Fnideq Prefecture	Prefecture	Tanger-Tétouan-Al Hoceïma	178.5
Tétouan Province	Province	Tanger-Tétouan-Al Hoceïma	2,541
Fahs Anjra Province	Province	Tanger-Tétouan-Al Hoceïma	332
Larache Province	Province	Tanger-Tétouan-Al Hoceïma	2,783
Al Hoceïma Province	Province	Tanger-Tétouan-Al Hoceïma	3,550
Chefchaouen Province	Province	Tanger-Tétouan-Al Hoceïma	4,350
Ouezzane Province	Province	Tanger-Tétouan-Al Hoceïma	1,861
