= ISO 3166-2:EH =

Entry for Western Sahara in ISO 3166-2

ISO 3166-2:EH is the entry for Western Sahara in ISO 3166-2, part of the ISO 3166 standard published by the International Organization for Standardization (ISO), which defines codes for the names of the principal subdivisions (e.g., provinces or states) of all countries coded in ISO 3166-1.

Currently no ISO 3166-2 codes are defined in the entry for Western Sahara.

Western Sahara, a disputed territory controlled by Morocco and the Sahrawi Arab Democratic Republic, is officially assigned the ISO 3166-1 alpha-2 code EH. Moreover, the following regions, provinces and prefectures of Morocco located in the territory of Western Sahara are assigned ISO 3166-2 codes under the entry for Morocco:

- MA-12 Dakhla-Oued Ed-Dahab (entirely in Western Sahara)
  - MA-AOU Aousserd (entirely in Western Sahara)
  - MA-OUD Oued Ed-Dahab (entirely in Western Sahara)
- MA-10 Guelmim-Oued Noun (partially in Western Sahara)
  - MA-ASZ Assa-Zag (partially in Western Sahara)
  - MA-TNT Tan-Tan (partially in Western Sahara)
- MA-11 Laâyoune-Sakia El Hamra (partially in Western Sahara)
  - MA-BOD Boujdour (entirely in Western Sahara)
  - MA-ESM Es-Semara (partially in Western Sahara)
  - MA-LAA Laâyoune (entirely in Western Sahara)
  - MA-TAF Tarfaya (partially in Western Sahara)

== See also ==
- Neighbouring countries: DZ, MA, MR
