= Allal ben Abdallah =

Moroccan laborer and attempted political assassin

- علال بن عبد الله
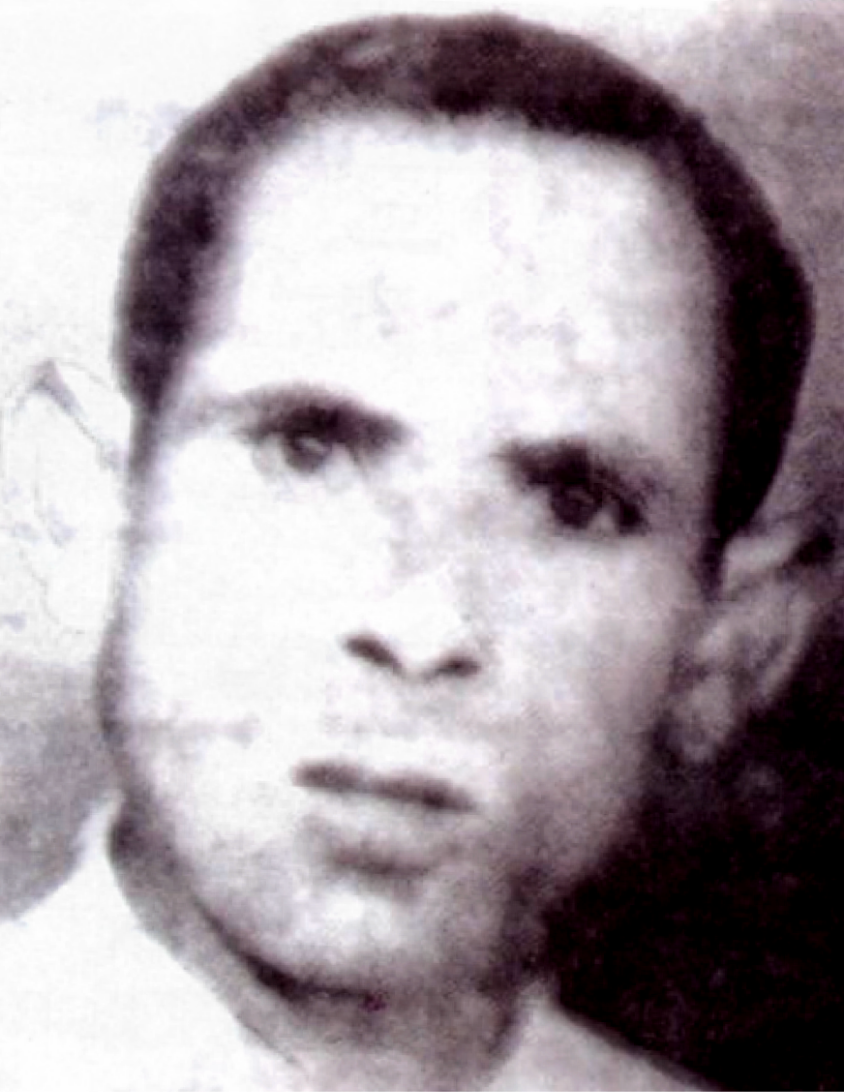
- Ben Abdallah, c. 1950
- Born: Allal ben Abdallah ben Bachir Zerouali; 1916; Guercif, Morocco
- Died: September 11, 1953 (aged 36–37); Ahl Fas Mosque, Rabat, Morocco
- Cause of death: Gunshot wound
- Resting place: Achouhada cemetery, Rabat, Morocco
- Known for: Attempted assassination of Mohammed ben Arafa
- Political party: Istiqlal Party
- Spouse: Khadija bent Larbi Belghmi (m. 1935)
- Children: 1

Allal ben Abdallah ben Bachir Zerouali (1916 – September 11, 1953) was a Moroccan laborer who attempted to assassinate the French-installed Sultan, Mohammed ben Arafa. The assassination attempt occurred on September 11, 1953, in response to the exile of Sultan Mohammed V by the French protectorate.

== Early life and career ==
Allal ben Abdallah ben Bachir Zerouali was born in 1916 in the village of Ouled Salah near Guercif. He was a member of the Houara Oulad Raho tribe.

His father was Abdallah ben Bachir and his mother was Khaira bent Mohamed. He was raised in the village, where he attended a religious school. He married Khadija bent Larbi Belghmi and had a child, Abdallah Zerouali.

The couple moved to Guercif, where he learned dyeing and ran a workshop in the city center where he worked as an artisan painter and as a dry-cleaner.

Ben Abdallah moved with his family to Taza and later to Fes, where he continued working in dyeing and as a shoemaker.

== Life in Rabat ==
He moved with his family to the El Akkari neighborhood of Rabat in 1947. He began working as a well driller and joined the nationalist Istiqlal Party the same year.

Ben Abdallah met members of National Resistance Movement led by Hajj Ahmed Cherkaoui and became a local delegate for the Istiqlal in the neighborhood.

He joined the Scoutisme Hassania, a scouting organization founded in 1933, where he began working as an active volunteer member. Ben Abdallah lived a largely modest life, working as a house painter at the time of his attack.

== Assassination attempt and death ==
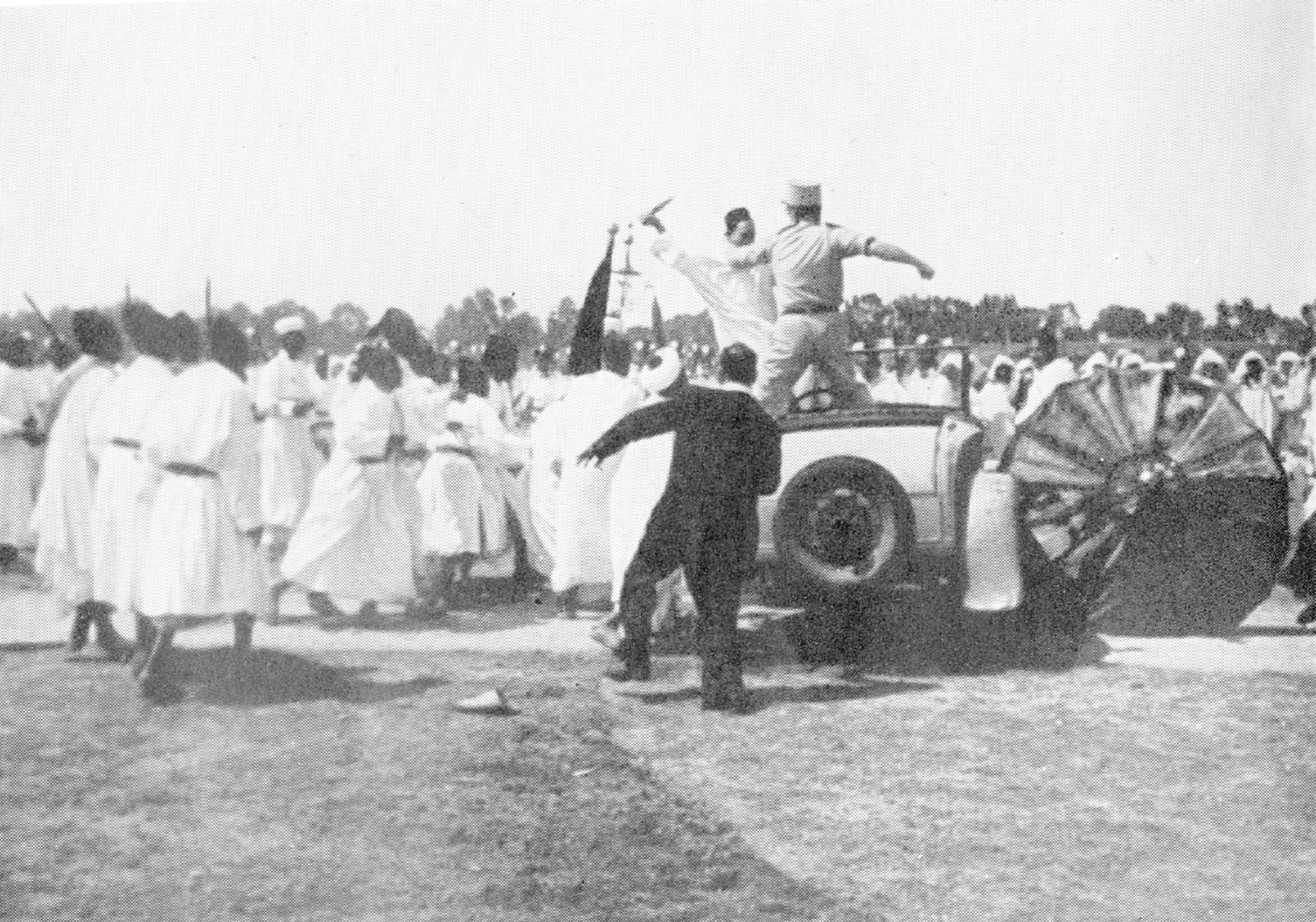
Allal ben Abdallah, pictured on top of his car while being stopped by a non-commissioned officer

Allal ben Abdallah became increasingly frustrated against the French protectorate in Morocco following the exile of Sultan Mohammed V to Madagascar and the installment of a puppet, Mohammed ben Arafa. He was unable to obtain a gun from his contacts in the National Resistance Movement, and was rather given a polished knife from his neighbor, Larbi Ayouni. He left 1,000 Moroccan franc to his wife and child.

On September 11, 1953, at Zuhr prayer, Allal ben Abdallah drove a 1930 Ford Model A convertible with the license plate 2460 MA 9 to the Ahl Fas Mosque where Ben Arafa was holding a ceremony for Friday prayer. Ben Abdallah drove into the crowd and lunged at Ben Arafa with the knife, severely injuring the horse leading the ceremony.

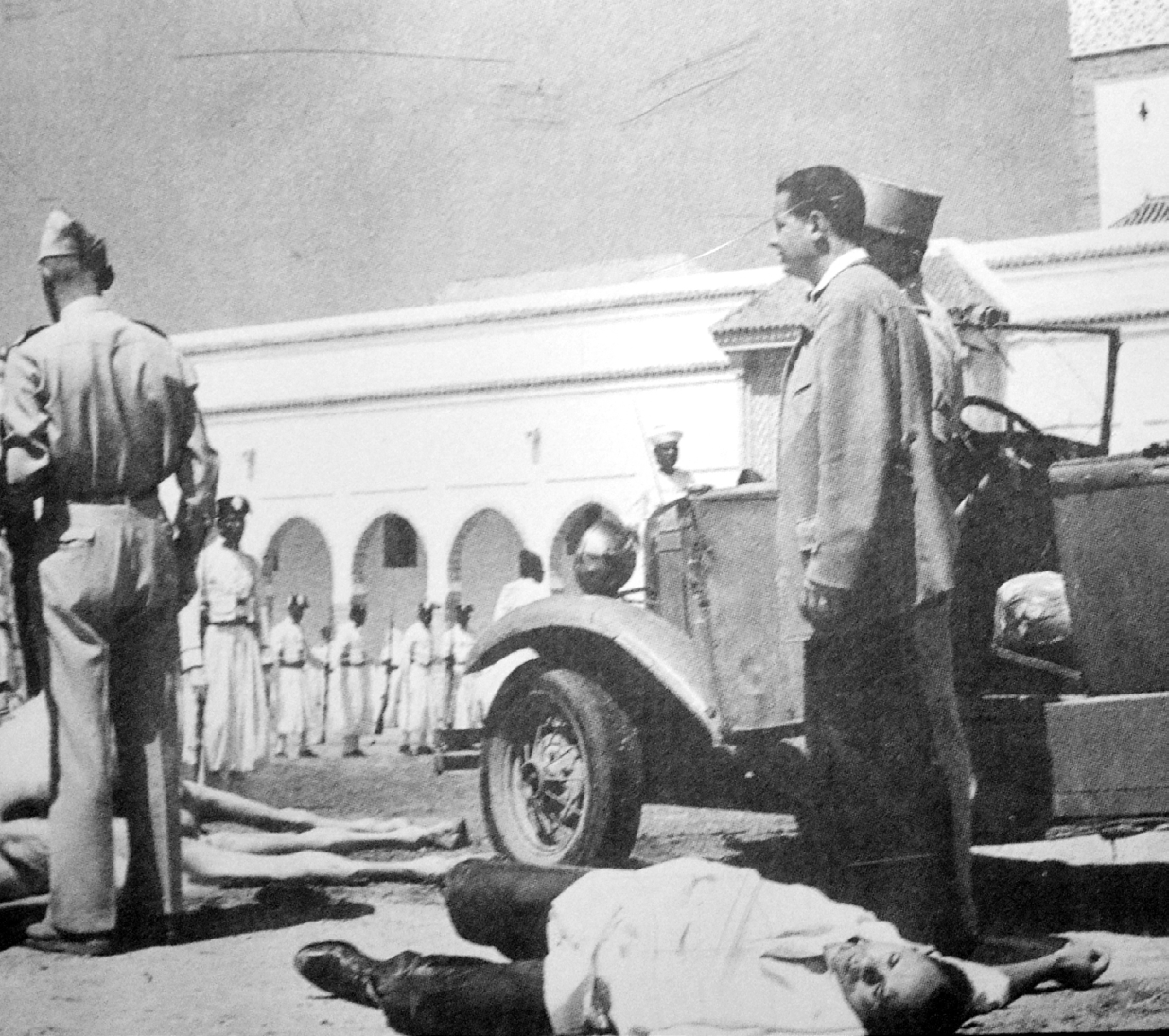
Ben Abdallah lies dead after being shot by the Royal Guard

A non-commissioned officer in the Royal Guard, Robert King, attempted to tackle Ben Abdallah and was stabbed in the left shoulder. Despite this, King managed to throw his knife onto the ground.

Ben Abdallah rushed into his car and continued driving before being shot with a revolver by Algerian officer Mohamed Belhouari, he stood up despite being injured before he was shot again and died of his injuries. Belhouari had shot him nine times in the back.

A number of photographers were present at the ceremony, with the attack having been filmed by filmmaker Brahim Sayah. French colonial police claimed that the attack was personal, and was motivated by his wife's supposed links to the Royal Family.

== Burial and legacy ==
In 1956, the officer who shot and killed Allal ben Abdallah, Mohamed Belhouari, was killed in Agadir by nationalist Ahmed Agouliz of the Moroccan Army of Liberation.

Ben Abdallah's attack led to a large range of activities against the French protectorate in Morocco. His only son, Abdallah Zerouali, became a major in the Royal Moroccan Army. His grandson is footballer and basketball player Karim Zerouali, who played in the Wydad AC and the Hassania Agadir.
