= Oued Heimer =

- Town
- Interactive map of Oued Heimer
- Coordinates: 34.455°N 1.90222°W
- Country: Morocco
- Region: Oriental
- Province: Jerada

Population (2004)
  - Total: 1,997
- Time zone: UTC+0 (GMT)

Oued Heimer is a mining town in Jerada Province, Oriental, Morocco. It is located 31 km south of Oujda and 17 km west of Touissit.

According to the 2004 census it has a population of 1,997.
