= Ras Laksar =

Ras Laksar ⵜⴰⵛⴰⴽⴽⴰ ⵏ ⵉⵖⵔⵎ راس القصر
- Commune
- Interactive map of Ras Laksar
- Coordinates: 33.9820°N 3.7494°W
- Country: Morocco
- Region: Oriental
- Province: Guercif

Population (September 2014)
  - Total: 10,515
- Time zone: UTC+0 (GMT)

Ras Laksar is a commune in Guercif Province of the Oriental administrative region of Morocco. At the time of the 2004 census, the commune had a total population of 10,708 people living in 1491 households. The 2014 Moroccan census recorded a population of 10,515 living in 1771 households.
