= Laaouinate =

Coordinates: 31°31′N 7°49′W

Laaouinate العوينات
- Town
- Interactive map of Laaouinate
- Country: Morocco
- Region: Oriental
- Province: Jerada Province

Population (2004)
  - Total: 3,790
- Time zone: UTC+0 (GMT)

Laaouinate is a town in Jerada Province, Oriental, Morocco. According to the 2004 census it has a population of 3790.
