= Sidi Ahmed Laaroussi =

Rural commune in Western Sahara

Sidi Ahmed Laaroussi سيدي أحمد العروسي (Arabic) Sidi Ahmed Laarosi (Spanish)
- Location in Western Sahara
- Coordinates: 26°49′22″N 11°46′24″W
- Non-self-governing territory: Western Sahara
- Claimed by: Morocco; Sahrawi Republic
- Controlled by: Morocco
- Region: Laâyoune-Sakia El Hamra
- Province: Es Semara

Area
  - Total: 11.47 km^{2} (4.43 sq mi)

Population (2014)
  - Total: 269
  - Density: 23.5/km^{2} (60.7/sq mi)
- Time zone: UTC+0 (GMT)

Sidi Ahmed Laaroussi (Arabic: سيدي أحمد العروسي; Spanish: Sidi Ahmed Laarosi) is a small town and rural commune in the Es Semara Province of the Laâyoune-Sakia El Hamra region of the Moroccan-occupied part of Western Sahara. At the time of the 2014 census, the commune had a total population of 269 people.
