= Al Majjatia Oulad Taleb =

- Rural commune and town
- Location within Morocco
- Coordinates: 33.4844°N 7.5121°W
- Country: Morocco
- Region: Casablanca-Settat
- Province: Médiouna

Population (2004)
  - Total: 23,322
- Time zone: UTC+0 (GMT)

Al Majjatia Oulad Taleb is a small town and rural commune in Médiouna Province of the Casablanca-Settat region of Morocco. At the time of the 2004 census, the commune had a total population of 23322 people living in 4711 households.
