= Derb Ghallef =

Derb Ghallef is a popular neighborhood in Casablanca, Morocco. It is best known for its Joutia market, an essentially informal marketplace where electronic goods and counterfeit products are sold at modest and affordable prices for the majority of the Moroccan population. The area also features merchants dealing in furniture, clothing, and multimedia items.

Located in the very center of Casablanca, within one of the city’s largest municipalities, the land on which this market stands is privately owned. The market was illegally established by order of the authorities at the time, following a fire that destroyed the old market, formerly known as Joutia de Kria. The affected merchants were temporarily relocated to this neighborhood in 1986, where they have remained ever since. Today, more than 4,000 merchants operate and thrive there without official authorization. Moroccan authorities currently face a complex challenge, as the legal status of the Derb Ghallef market remains somewhat controversial.

== History ==
A man from Mediouna, El Hajj Bou’azza, nicknamed Ghallef, who served as the Amin (representative) of leather merchants, owned vast tracts of land in this area. Upon his death in 1905, his estate was divided, and the parcel of land where Derb Ghallef now stands fell into the hands of six heirs. The most enterprising among them, Mohammed Zemmouri, acting on behalf of all the heirs, began during World War I to rent out lots, or zribas, of 36 square meters each, with droit de zina (right of enjoyment), a customary arrangement long practiced in Casablanca. The tenants soon began constructing permanent buildings on these lots.

By the end of 1919, 52 houses had already been built. The municipal authorities then intervened, and in 1920, the Pasha’s court ordered their demolition, as the area was reserved for the expansion of European residential quarters. However, the order was never enforced, and construction continued unabated — by 1921, the number of buildings had reached into the hundreds. To evade municipal inspection, residents of Derb Ghallef worked on European public holidays and at night by torchlight. Reports and fines proved ineffective in stopping the expansion.

As Derb Ghallef developed, a space located between its two main longitudinal streets, Zemmouri and Lm’dan (about one kilometer from the current Joutia site), spanning three alleyways in width, was set aside for a market known as the Souika. The landowners charged higher rents for shops than for residences, and the activity of over a hundred merchants there was remarkably intense.

== Organization and Trade ==
The Joutia (flea market) of before 1982 and that of today have markedly different configurations.

From a quantitative standpoint, the earlier market comprised around 700 stalls, while the current one hosts 1,387 individuals, distributed as follows: 938 operate directly within the Joutia itself, 449 work in the Salam Market, also known as the Selk, and 128 are vendors who regularly deposit their goods while awaiting permanent allocation. These individuals are officially recognized by the municipality, not counting the many others who hover around the market, awaiting a change in legal status.

From a qualitative perspective, the types of trades practiced have evolved considerably. Some have disappeared, such as shoemaking, while others have transformed, like carpentry and mattress making. Meanwhile, new professions have emerged to meet the demands of the modern market.

== Current Conflicts ==
=== Since the 1982 Fire ===
In 1982, a few months prior to the devastating fire, investigators had unofficially catalogued the merchants, traders, and artisans of Derb Ghallef, according to the size of their spaces, type of activity, and several other indicators. After the fire, traders were required to prove their seniority, which led to the creation of a comprehensive mapping system identifying 730 original merchants who needed to be relocated.

The authorities resorted to an illegal solution, which ultimately gave rise to the current land dispute. The land on which the present Joutia stands belonged to over fifty heirs, many of whom lived abroad and rarely made contact. The 730 original traders received temporary permits allowing them to set up and build commercial spaces—without concrete foundations. More than twenty-five years later, the Joutia remains on the same land, and the heirs, whose numbers have since multiplied, are still awaiting resolution. The same pattern that led to the birth of Derb Ghallef has thus repeated itself.

On December 8, 2023, a violent fire once again broke out in the Derb Ghallef district.

=== The Current Land Deadlock ===
The State and the Maârif Municipality benefit from the Market, obtaining an operating permit can reportedly cost up to 250,000 dirhams, according to several merchants — this includes the official municipal fees as well as commissions for specialized intermediaries. The permit is “temporary”, meaning the authorities reserve the right to revoke it at any time.

According to multiple sources within the Joutia, the authorities have no real incentive to clear the land. Until recently, the municipality collected rent from each shop; this rent was later converted into a municipal tax, ranging from 50 to 100 dirhams per month, depending on shop size. Additionally, traders are subject to tax obligations: despite being known as a hub of the informal economy, Derb Ghallef does contribute to public revenues. Each trader pays a flat-rate professional tax between 500 and 1,200 dirhams, depending on their line of business.

Meanwhile, the landowners receive neither rent nor royalties from the ongoing commercial use of their property.

=== The Parent Land Title Illegally Fragmented ===
The land in dispute corresponds to property title no. 4238D, inherited by the current owners. Since the late 1970s, a series of administrative and political decisions has illegally fragmented the 25-hectare property into multiple land titles, effectively preventing the rightful owners from fully exercising their ownership rights.

Over a 30-year period, the authorities responsible for the land initiated several projects — including expropriation procedures, the construction of a primary school, and the building of housing for the police directorate. Each of these actions led to prolonged legal disputes between the state authorities and the private landowners.
