= Lebkhata =

Lebkhata, Morocco
- Town
- Interactive map of Lebkhata, Morocco
- Coordinates: 34.208056°N 2.378333°W
- Country: Morocco
- Region: Oriental
- Province: Jerada Province

Population (2004)
  - Total: 2,546
- Time zone: UTC+0 (GMT)

Lebkhata is a town in Jerada Province, Oriental, Morocco. According to the 2004 census it has a population of 2,546.
