= Sidi Boubker =

Sidi Boubker may refer to:

- Sidi Boubker, Jerada Province, Morocco
- Sidi Boubker, Rehamna Province, Morocco
