= Assebbab =

Coordinates: 35°08′N 3°05′W

- Commune
- Interactive map of Assebbab
- Country: Morocco
- Region: Oriental
- Province: Guercif

Population (September 2014)
  - Total: 7,069
- Time zone: UTC+0 (GMT)

Assebbab is a commune in Guercif Province of the Oriental administrative region of Morocco. At the time of the 2004 census, the commune had a total population of 6721 people living in 948 households. The 2014 census recorded a population of 7069 living in 1083 households.
