= Oulad Bourima =

Oulad Bourima أولاد بوريمة
- Commune
- Location within Morocco Location within Africa
- Coordinates: 34.3538°N 3.7492°W
- Country: Morocco
- Region: Oriental
- Province: Guercif

Population (September 2014)
  - Total: 1,486
- Time zone: UTC+0 (GMT)

Oulad Bourima is a commune in Guercif Province of the Oriental administrative region of Morocco. At the time of the 2004 census, the commune had a total population of 1951 people living in 318 households. The 2014 Moroccan census recorded a population of 1486 living in 296 households.
