= Barkine =

- commune
- Location within Morocco Location within Africa
- Coordinates: 33.7665°N 3.8438°W
- Country: Morocco
- Region: Oriental
- Province: Guercif

Population (2014)
  - Total: 9,469
- Time zone: UTC+0 (GMT)

Barkine is a commune in Guercif Province of the Oriental administrative region of Morocco. At the time of the 2004 census, the commune had a total population of 11409 people living in 1657 households. The 2014 census recorded a population of 9469 living in 1522 households.
