= Gafait =

Gafait, Morocco
- Town
- Interactive map of Gafait, Morocco
- Coordinates: 34°14′02″N 2°16′56″W
- Country: Morocco
- Region: Oriental
- Province: Jerada Province
- Elevation: 2,713 ft (827 m)

Population (2004)
  - Total: 2,654
- Time zone: UTC+0 (GMT)
- Postal code: 64573

Gafait also known as Tagafait by locals, is a town in Jerada Province, Oriental, Morocco. According to the 2004 census it has a population of 2654.
