= Lamrija =

Lamrija المريجة
- Commune
- Location within Morocco Location within Africa
- Coordinates: 33.9912°N 3.2791°W
- Country: Morocco
- Region: Oriental
- Province: Guercif

Population (September 2014)
  - Total: 14,563
- Time zone: UTC+0 (GMT)

Lamrija is a commune in Guercif Province of the Oriental administrative region of Morocco. At the time of the 2004 census, the commune had a total population of 13813 people living in 2050 households. The 2014 Moroccan census recorded a population of 14,563 living in 2485 households.
