= Ras Asfour =

Ras Asfour رأس عصفور
- Town
- Interactive map of Ras Asfour
- Coordinates: 34°31′08″N 1°50′41″W
- Country: Morocco
- Region: Oriental
- Province: Jerada Province

Population (2004)
  - Total: 1,694
- Time zone: UTC+0 (GMT)

Ras Asfour is a town in Jerada Province, Oriental, Morocco. According to the 2004 census it has a population of 1694.
