= Attack on Tichla (1979) =

1979 battle

- Part of Western Sahara War
Date	12 July 1979
Location	Tichla, Western Sahara
Result	Polisario Front victory
Territorial changes	Polisario Front forces capture Tichla

Belligerents
Sahrawi Arab Democratic Republic; Polisario Front	Mauritania

Commanders and leaders
Mohamed Abdelaziz	Mohamed Mahmoud Ould Louly

Strength
Unknown	Unknown

Casualties and losses
Unknown	90–150 killed 73 captured

The Attack on Tichla took place on July 12, 1979, in the town of Tichla, in Western Sahara. It marked the final engagement between Mauritania and Polisario before the peace treaty in Algiers and Mauritania's withdrawal from the Western Sahara War.

== Background ==
On 10 July 1978, facing a severe economic crisis due to the cost of the war, the regime of Moktar Ould Daddah was overthrown by Colonel Moustapha Ould Mohamed Saleck and his National Recovery Military Committee (CMRN), later renamed the National Salvation Military Committee (CMSN). Immediately after this coup d'état, the Polisario declared a unilateral ceasefire, assuming that Mauritania intended to peacefully withdraw from the conflict. However, mindful of maintaining his country's alliance with Morocco, negotiations between Mauritania and the Polisario stalled. Meanwhile, Mohamed Mahmoud Ould Louly overthrew Moustapha Ould Mohamed Saleck's government. The attack occurs on the eve of the Organization of African Unity conference in Monrovia, where a resolution regarding the Western Sahara war is expected to emerge.

== Battle ==
On 12 July 1979, the Polisario broke the ceasefire and captured the town of Tichla, causing heavy casualties among the Mauritanian garrison.

== Aftermath ==
Following this attack, Mauritania threatened to seek assistance from France and Morocco in the face of potential further attacks. The Polisario Front declared that any Mauritanian retaliation would prompt them to launch new attacks, extending beyond Tichla into undisputed Mauritanian territory. Alarmed by the prospect of continuing the war, Mauritania, nonetheless, signed a positive vote on the referendum requested by the Polisario and endorsed by the heads of state of the Organisation of African Unity. On July 29, 1979, the Prime Minister of the Sahrawi Arab Democratic Republic (SADR), Mohamed Lamine Ould Ahmed, announces the release of the 73 Mauritanian soldiers captured during the attack. This response came following a request made on behalf of the ad hoc committee of the Organization of African Unity on Western Sahara by the heads of state of Mali and Nigeria. The release followed that of the Mauritanian prefect of Tichla, Abdoullahi Ould Mokhtar Ould Kabd, who was also captured during the attack.

Following the announcement of the release of the Mauritanian soldiers, Mohamed Khouna Ould Haidalla, the Mauritanian Prime Minister, declared that his country has chosen to definitively withdraw from this "fratricidal and unjust war," emphasizing that Mauritania has no territorial claims over Western Sahara. On August 5, 1979, Mauritanian President Mohamed Mahmoud Ould Louly signs a peace treaty in Algiers, officially confirming the withdrawal of Mauritanian troops from the Río de Oro region, which is immediately annexed by the Moroccan army.
