= Tiouli =

Tiouli, Morocco
- Town
- Interactive map of Tiouli, Morocco
- Coordinates: 34.3670°N 1.8369°W
- Country: Morocco
- Region: Oriental
- Province: Jerada Province

Population (2004)
  - Total: 6,317
- Time zone: UTC+0 (GMT)

Tiouli is a town in Jerada Province, Oriental, Morocco. According to the 2004 census it has a population of 6317.
