= Mrija, Morocco =

Mrija, Morocco مريجة
- Town
- Interactive map of Mrija, Morocco
- Coordinates: 34°01′12″N 2°22′48″W
- Country: Morocco
- Region: Oriental
- Province: Jerada Province

Population (2014)
  - Total: 3,359
- Time zone: UTC+0 (GMT)

Mrija is a town in Jerada Province, Oriental, Morocco. According to the 2014 census it has a population of 3,359.
