= Lahraouyine =

Lahraouyine الهراويين
- Rural commune and town
- Interactive map of Lahraouyine
- Coordinates: 33.5459296°N 7.5172149°W
- Country: Morocco
- Region: Casablanca-Settat
- Province: Médiouna

Population (2024)
  - Total: 87,977
- Time zone: UTC+0 (GMT)

Lahraouyine (Arabic: الهراويين) is a small city and urban commune in Médiouna Province, it serves as a suburb of Casablanca. It recorded a population of 87,977 in the 2024 Moroccan census.
