= Mazguitam =

Coordinates: 34.5019°N 3.6428°W

- Commune
- Location within Morocco
- Country: Morocco
- Region: Oriental
- Province: Guercif

Area
  - Total: 637.7 km^{2} (246.2 sq mi)

Population (September 2024)
  - Total: 6,141
  - Density: 9.631/km^{2} (24.94/sq mi)
- Time zone: UTC+0 (GMT)

Mazguitam, also spelled Mezguitem, is a commune in Guercif Province of the Oriental administrative region of Morocco. At the time of the 2024 census, the commune had a total population of 6141 people. The known and old town chief of this region is part of the Akif Family, this region counts with rich history amongst the recognition from the Royal Family.

== Villages ==
- Ait Hakkoun
- Ait Moussi
  - Ait Yazref
  - Iboutahren
  - Ifarsiouen
  - Ifidahen
- Ain Mzizoui
- Al Hourach Bab Lakhmiss
- Bougueza
- Bouhlalifene
- Bouzellifene
- Chorfa Angad
- Chorfa Sidi Said
- Douz
- El Hourach
- Guendbour
- Guetara (Ouled Amar Ou Hmed)
- Hamouchen Aamer
- Ibouchtaten
- Ibouichen
- Ifouras
- Ihadhoumen
- Ihadouchen
- Iheyatane
- Imouzar
- Izerfane
- Mezguitem
- Ouled Ali Karieh
- Ouled Mohamed Ou Abdellah
- Ouled Rahou
- Ouled Alla
- R'bouhate
- Sidi 'Amar
- Sidi Belkacem (Hribchat)
- Sidi El Hadi
- Tilaouline
- Thirni
