= Taddart =

Coordinates: 34.1881°N 3.7078°W

- Commune
- Location within Morocco
- Country: Morocco
- Region: Oriental
- Province: Guercif

Population (September 2014)
  - Total: 22,138
- Time zone: UTC+0 (GMT)

Taddart is a commune in Guercif Province of the Oriental administrative region of Morocco. At the time of the 2004 census, the commune had a total population of 20474 people living in 3104 households. The 2014 Moroccan census recorded a population of 22,138 living in 3928 households.
