= Sidi Hajjaj Oued Hassar =

Coordinates: 32.9125°N 7.2647°W

Sidi Hajjaj Oued Hassar سيدي حجاج واد حصار
- Rural commune and town
- Interactive map of Sidi Hajjaj Oued Hassar
- Country: Morocco
- Region: Casablanca-Settat
- Province: Médiouna

Population (2004)
  - Total: 20,245
- Time zone: UTC+0 (GMT)

Sidi Hajjaj Oued Hassar is a small town and rural commune in Médiouna Province of the Casablanca-Settat region of Morocco. At the time of the 2004 census, the commune had a total population of 20245 people living in 3723 households.
