= Saka, Morocco =

Coordinates: 34°37′N 3°25′W

- Commune
- Location within Morocco
- Country: Morocco
- Region: Oriental
- Province: Guercif

Population (September 2014)
  - Total: 21,048
- Time zone: UTC+0 (GMT)

Saka is a commune in Guercif Province of the Oriental administrative region of Morocco. At the time of the 2004 census, the commune had a total population of 19,547 people living in 2879 households. The 2014 Moroccan census recorded a population of 21,048 living in 3493 households.
