= Ain Bni Mathar =

Coordinates: 34°05′20″N 2°01′29″W

- Town
- Interactive map of Ain Bni Mathar
- Country: Morocco
- Region: Oriental
- Province: Jerada

Population (2014)
  - Total: 16,289
- Time zone: UTC+0 (GMT)

Ain Bni Mathar (Arabic: عين بني مطهر) is a town and municipality in Jerada Province, Eastern region, Morocco. It is located 81 km south of Oujda and 36 km from the Algerian border.

At the time of the 2004 census, it had a population of 13,526.

In 2011 the first Thermo Solar Combined Cycle Power Plant of Morocco was constructed near the town.
