= Ain Beni Mathar Integrated Thermo Solar Combined Cycle Power Plant =

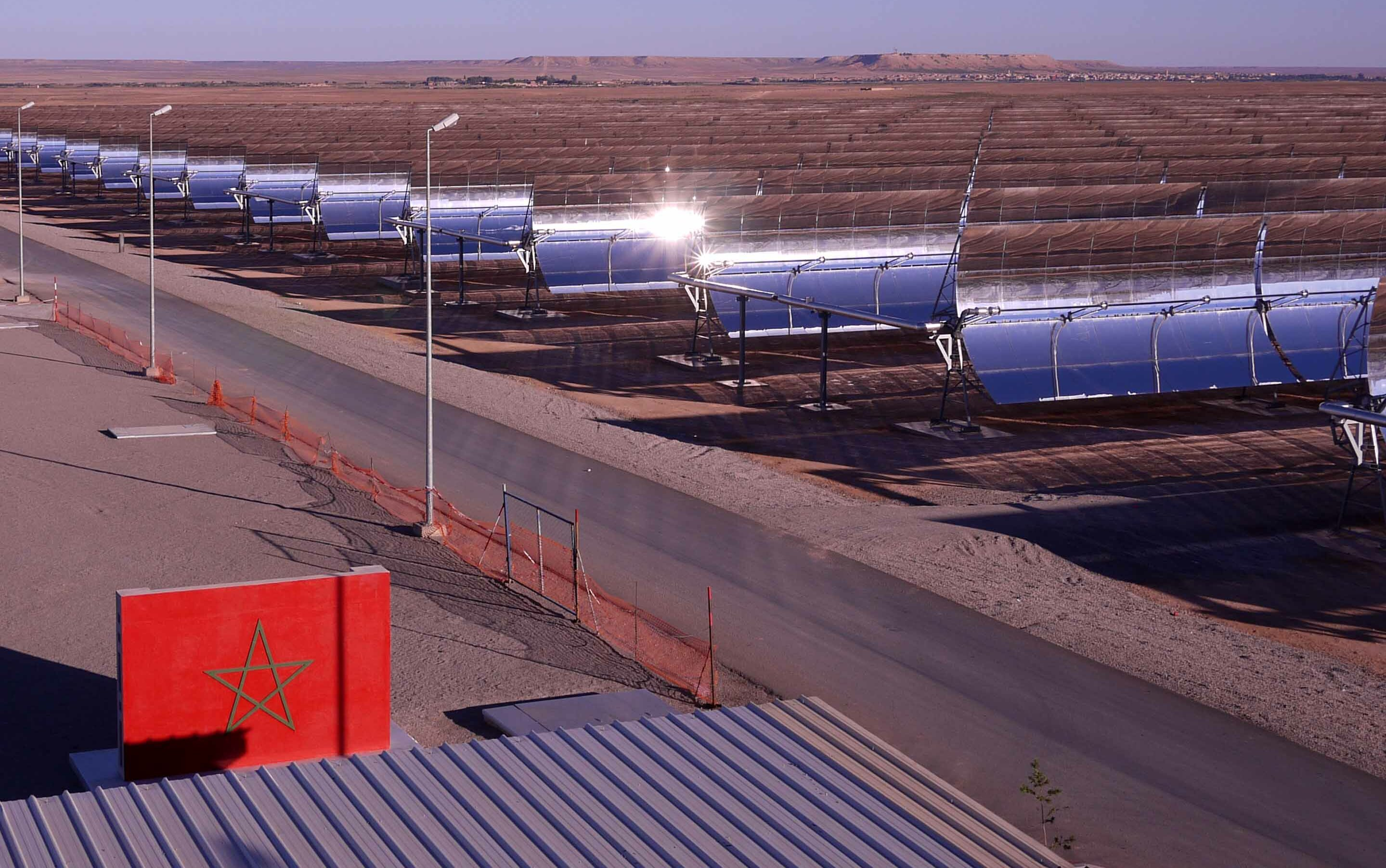
- The ISCC in 2010
- Country: Morocco
- Location: Ain Bni Mathar; Jerada Province; Oriental Region
- Coordinates: 34°4′6″N 2°6′17″W
- Status: Operational
- Construction began: 2008
- Commission date: 2011; 14 years ago
- Operator: L'Office National de l'Électricité (ONE)

Solar farm
- Type: CSP
- CSP technology: Parabolic trough

Thermal power station
- Primary fuel: Natural gas
- Combined cycle?: Yes

Power generation
- Make and model: Alstom
- Nameplate capacity: 472 MW
- Annual net output: 3,538 GWh

External links
- Website: www.one.org.ma

The Ain Beni Mathar Integrated Thermo Solar Combined Cycle Power Plant (also known as ISCC Ain Beni Mathar or Aïn Beni Mathar ISCC) is an integrated solar combined cycle power generation plant in northeastern Morocco. It is located in the commune of Ain Bni Mathar within Jerada Province, in the Oriental Region.

Construction began in March 2008 and the facility was commissioned in 2011.

== Description ==
The plant site, which has a total area of 160 hectares (395 acres), is characterized by a very large solar field, covering about 88 hectares (217 acres). The total capacity of the plant is 472 MW_{e} of which up to 20 MW_{e} may be delivered from solar energy, and can generate an average annual energy production of about 3,538 GW·h. The plant uses natural gas as fuel. It is connected via a 12.6 km long pipe to the Maghreb-Europe (GME) pipeline.

With a total cost of 4.6 billion dirhams, ($554 million), the project was funded by the African Development Bank (AfBD), the Official Credit Institute of Spain (ICO) and the Global Environment Facility (GEF) through a grant of $43.2 million, with the balance being provided by L'Office National de l'Électricité (ONE).

== Specifications ==
The plant consists of two 150.28 Mwe Alstom GT13E gas turbines fueled by natural gas, a 172 Mwe Alstom DKYZ2-1N41B steam turbine, a 183,200 m^{2} (1,972,000 sq ft) collector surface solar parabolic trough field, a solar heat exchanger, and two heat recovery exchangers (recovery boilers), one for each gas turbine. The recovery boiler recovers the gas turbine waste heat.

The solar energy collected at the parabolic troughs can increase the flow of steam produced in the recovery boilers. The steam produced in the two recovery boilers is expanded in the three body steam turbine (High, Medium and Low Pressure).

The solar radiation can contribute to up to 20 Mwe of the power plant output. It is understood that the solar field does not increase the total power, but simply lowers the specific consumption (from 6912.5 kJ/kW·h, at full power, to 6588.8 kJ/kW·h at full solar power).

The energy produced is transferred to the interconnection of Oujda and Bourdim via three 225 kV lines.

Condenser cooling is via an air condenser, and a water consumption of 850,000 m3/year.

The Combined Cycle component has a 93% availability factor and the Solar Field has a 95% availability factor.

Specific consumption of the GT13E gas turbine is 10080 kJ/kW·h.

Solar field input temperature is 292 °C (558 °F), output temperature is 392 °C (738 °F).

One collector is 150 m long and 5.7 m wide.

== See also ==
- List of solar thermal power stations
- Solar thermal energy
