= Oulad Ghziyel =

Oulad Ghziyel, Morocco أولاد غزبيل
- Town
- Interactive map of Oulad Ghziyel, Morocco
- Coordinates: 32°16′N 9°09′W
- Country: Morocco
- Region: Oriental
- Province: Jerada Province

Population (2024)
  - Total: 4,656
- Time zone: UTC+0 (GMT)

Oulad Ghziyel is a town in Jerada Province, Oriental, Morocco. According to the 2024 census it has a population of 4,656.
