= Oulad Sidi Abdelhakem =

Coordinates: 34°00′N 1°42′W

Oulad Sidi Abdelhakem, Morocco أولاد سيدي عبد الحاكم
- Town
- Interactive map of Oulad Sidi Abdelhakem, Morocco
- Country: Morocco
- Region: Oriental
- Province: Jerada Province

Population (2014)
  - Total: 2,207
- Time zone: UTC+0 (GMT)

Oulad Sidi Abdelhakem is a town in Jerada Province, Oriental, Morocco. According to the 2014 census the municipality had a population of 2,207 people living in 392 households.
