= Guenfouda =

Guenfouda, Morocco
- Town
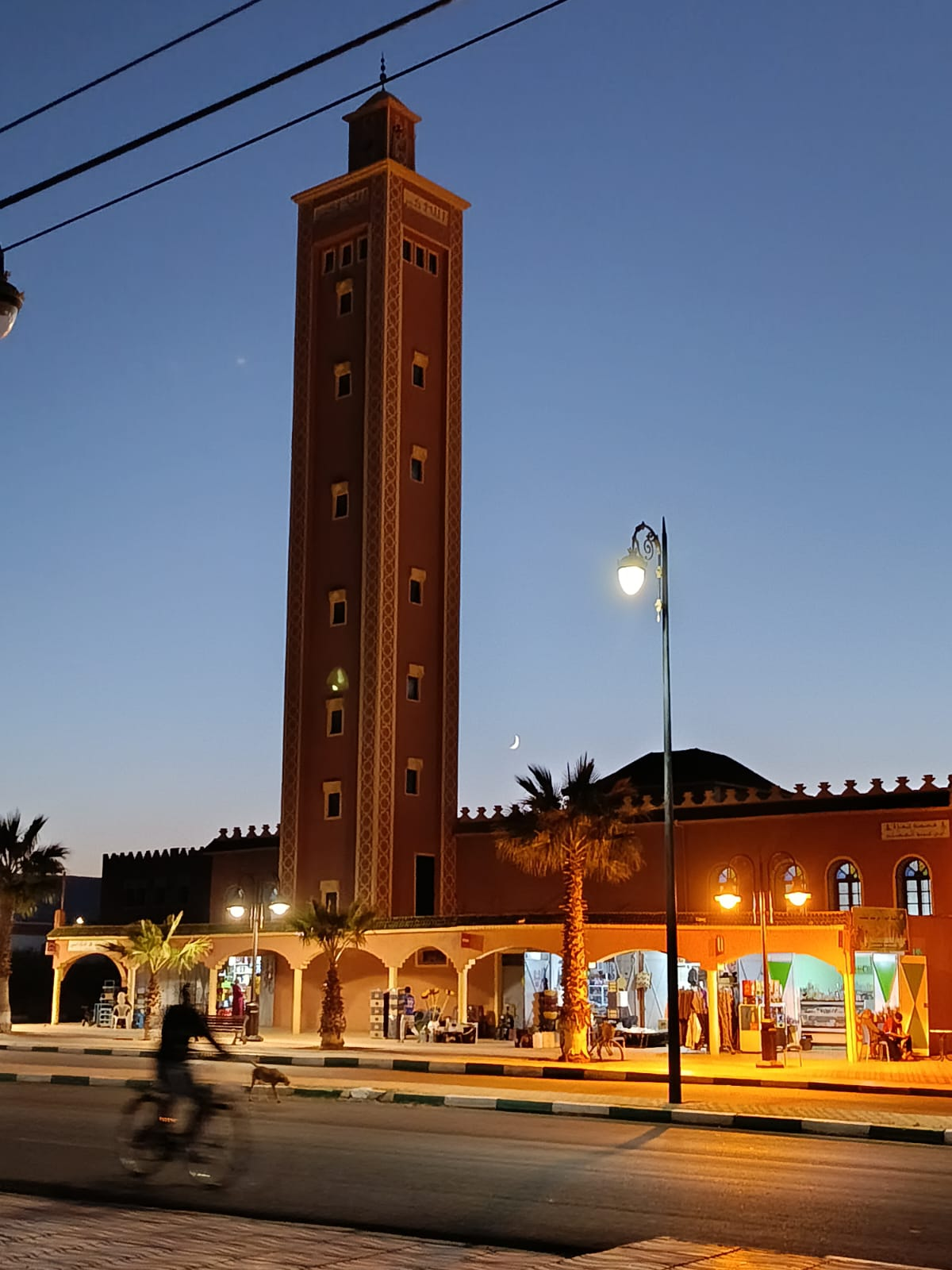
- Interactive map of Guenfouda, Morocco
- Coordinates: 34°29′01″N 2°02′44″W
- Country: Morocco
- Region: Oriental
- Province: Jerada Province

Population (2004)
  - Total: 5,748
- Time zone: UTC+0 (GMT)

Guenfouda is a town in Jerada Province, Oriental, Morocco. According to the 2004 census it has a population of 5,748.
