= Tichla =

Coordinates: 21.6100°N 15.0000°W

- Rural commune and town
- Interactive map of Tichla
- Territory: Western Sahara
- Claimed by: Kingdom of Morocco; Sahrawi Arab Democratic Republic
- Controlled by: Kingdom of Morocco
- Region: Dakhla-Oued Ed-Dahab
- Prefecture: Aousserd Province

Area
  - Total: 50.54 km^{2} (19.51 sq mi)

Population (2004)
  - Total: 6,036
  - Density: 119.4/km^{2} (309.3/sq mi)
- Time zone: UTC+0 (GMT)

Tichla is a small town in the Western Sahara under Moroccan occupation, which considers it as part of rural commune Aousserd Province in the Dakhla-Oued Ed-Dahab region. At the time of the 2004 census, the commune had a total population of 6,036 people living in 102 households. A few kilometers away is the Tichla Fortress.

== History ==
The town was initially a nomadic trading hub, and only gained a bit more relevance in the 20th Century.
