= Houara Oulad Raho =

- Commune
- Location within Morocco Location within Africa
- Coordinates: 34.1447°N 3.2266°W
- Country: Morocco
- Region: Oriental
- Province: Guercif

Population
  - Total: 31,462
- Time zone: UTC+0 (GMT)

Houara Oulad Raho is a commune in Guercif Province of the Oriental administrative region of Morocco. At the time of the 2004 census, the commune had a total population of 32,866 people living in 5595 households. The 2014 census recorded a population of 31,462 living in 5927 households.
