= ISO 3166-2:DZ =

Entry for Algeria in ISO 3166-2

ISO 3166-2:DZ is the entry for Algeria in ISO 3166-2, part of the ISO 3166 standard published by the International Organization for Standardization (ISO), which defines codes for the names of the principal subdivisions (e.g., provinces or states) of all countries coded in ISO 3166-1.

Currently for Algeria, ISO 3166-2 codes are defined for 58 provinces.

Each code consists of two parts, separated by a hyphen. The first part is DZ, the ISO 3166-1 alpha-2 code of Algeria. The second part is two digits:

- 01–31: provinces created in 1974
- 32–48: provinces created in 1983
- 49–58: provinces created in 2019

== Current codes ==
Subdivision names are listed as in the ISO 3166-2 standard published by the ISO 3166 Maintenance Agency (ISO 3166/MA).

Click on the button in the header to sort each column.

Map of Algeria with each province labeled with the second part of its ISO 3166-2 code.

Code	Subdivision name (ar) (conventional names)	Subdivision name (ar) (Note: For reference only, Arabic names in the Arabic script not included in the ISO 3166-2 standard.)
DZ-01	Adrar	أدرار
DZ-44	Aïn Defla	عين الدفلى
DZ-46	Aïn Témouchent	عين تموشنت
DZ-16	Alger	الجزائر
DZ-23	Annaba	عنابة
DZ-05	Batna	باتنة
DZ-08	Béchar	بشار
DZ-06	Béjaïa	بجاية
DZ-52	Béni Abbès	ولاية بني عباس
DZ-07	Biskra	بسكرة
DZ-09	Blida	البليدة
DZ-50	Bordj Badji Mokhtar	ولاية برج باجي مختار
DZ-34	Bordj Bou Arréridj	برج بوعريريج
DZ-10	Bouira	البويرة
DZ-35	Boumerdès	بومرداس
DZ-02	Chlef	الشلف
DZ-25	Constantine	قسنطينة
DZ-56	Djanet	ولاية جانت
DZ-17	Djelfa	الجلفة
DZ-32	El Bayadh	البيض
DZ-57	El Meghaier	ولاية المغير
DZ-58	El Meniaa	ولاية المنيعة
DZ-39	El Oued	الوادي
DZ-36	El Tarf	الطارف
DZ-47	Ghardaïa	غرداية
DZ-24	Guelma	قالمة
DZ-33	Illizi	اليزي
DZ-54	In Guezzam	ولاية عين قزّام
DZ-53	In Salah	ولاية عين صالح
DZ-18	Jijel	جيجل
DZ-40	Khenchela	خنشلة
DZ-03	Laghouat	الأغواط
DZ-28	M'sila	المسيلة
DZ-29	Mascara	معسكر
DZ-26	Médéa	المدية
DZ-43	Mila	ميلة
DZ-27	Mostaganem	مستغانم
DZ-45	Naama	النعامة
DZ-31	Oran	وهران
DZ-30	Ouargla	ورقلة
DZ-51	Ouled Djellal	ولاية أولاد جلال
DZ-04	Oum el Bouaghi	أم البواقي
DZ-48	Relizane	غليزان
DZ-20	Saïda	سعيدة
DZ-19	Sétif	سطيف
DZ-22	Sidi Bel Abbès	سيدي بلعباس
DZ-21	Skikda	سكيكدة
DZ-41	Souk Ahras	سوق أهراس
DZ-11	Tamanrasset	تمنراست
DZ-12	Tébessa	تبسة
DZ-14	Tiaret	تيارت
DZ-49	Timimoun	ولاية تيميمون
DZ-37	Tindouf	تندوف
DZ-42	Tipaza	تيبازة
DZ-38	Tissemsilt	تسمسيلت
DZ-15	Tizi Ouzou	تيزي وزو
DZ-13	Tlemcen	تلمسان
DZ-55	Touggourt	ولاية تقرت

== Changes ==
The following changes to the entry are listed on ISO's online catalogue, the Online Browsing Platform:

Effective date of change	Short description of change (en)
2022-11-29	Addition of province DZ-49, DZ-50, DZ-51, DZ-52, DZ-53, DZ-54, DZ-55, DZ-56, DZ-57, DZ-58; Update list source
2018-11-26	Correction of the romanization system label
2016-11-15	Change of spelling of DZ-28; Update list source
2014-10-29	Change subdivision name of DZ-11; Update List Source

== See also ==
- Subdivisions of Algeria
- FIPS region codes of Algeria
- Neighbouring countries: EH, LY, MA, ML, MR, NE, TN
