= Touissit =

Coordinates: 34°28′N 1°46′W

- Town
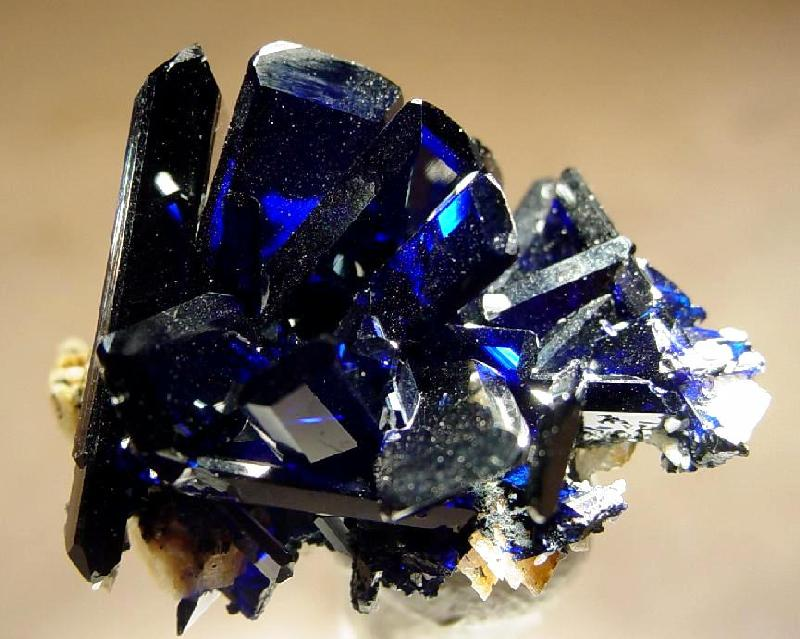
- Azurite from Toussit
- Interactive map of Touissit
- Country: Morocco
- Region: Oriental
- Province: Jerada

Population (2004)
  - Total: 3,429
- Time zone: UTC+0 (GMT)

Touissit is a town in Jerada Province, Oriental, Morocco. According to the 2004 census, it has a population of 3429.

The Touissit-Bou Beker district is the most important Mississippi Valley-Type (MVT) mining district of Northern Africa. Touissit-Bou Beker is well known among mineral collectors for fine specimens of anglesite, cerussite, azurite, vanadinite and other minerals.
