= Tichla Fortress =

Fortress in Western Sahara

- Interactive map of the Tichla Fortress area

General information
- Type: Tourist Attraction
- Location: Tichla, Western Sahara
- Coordinates: 21°35′58″N 14°58′1″W
- Construction started: 1936

Design and construction
- Architect: Spanish Colonists

The Tichla Fortress (Arabic: تیشلا) is a fort in the Moroccan occupied Western Sahara. It was built by the Spanish during their reign in Spanish Sahara in 1936. During the Mauritanian campaign in Western Sahara, fighting was seen in the town of Tichla and the fortress. Currently it is under Moroccan occupation in the disputed Western Sahara.
