= Sidi Boubker, Jerada Province =

Sidi Boubker Asahar Barbare Mohammed
- Town
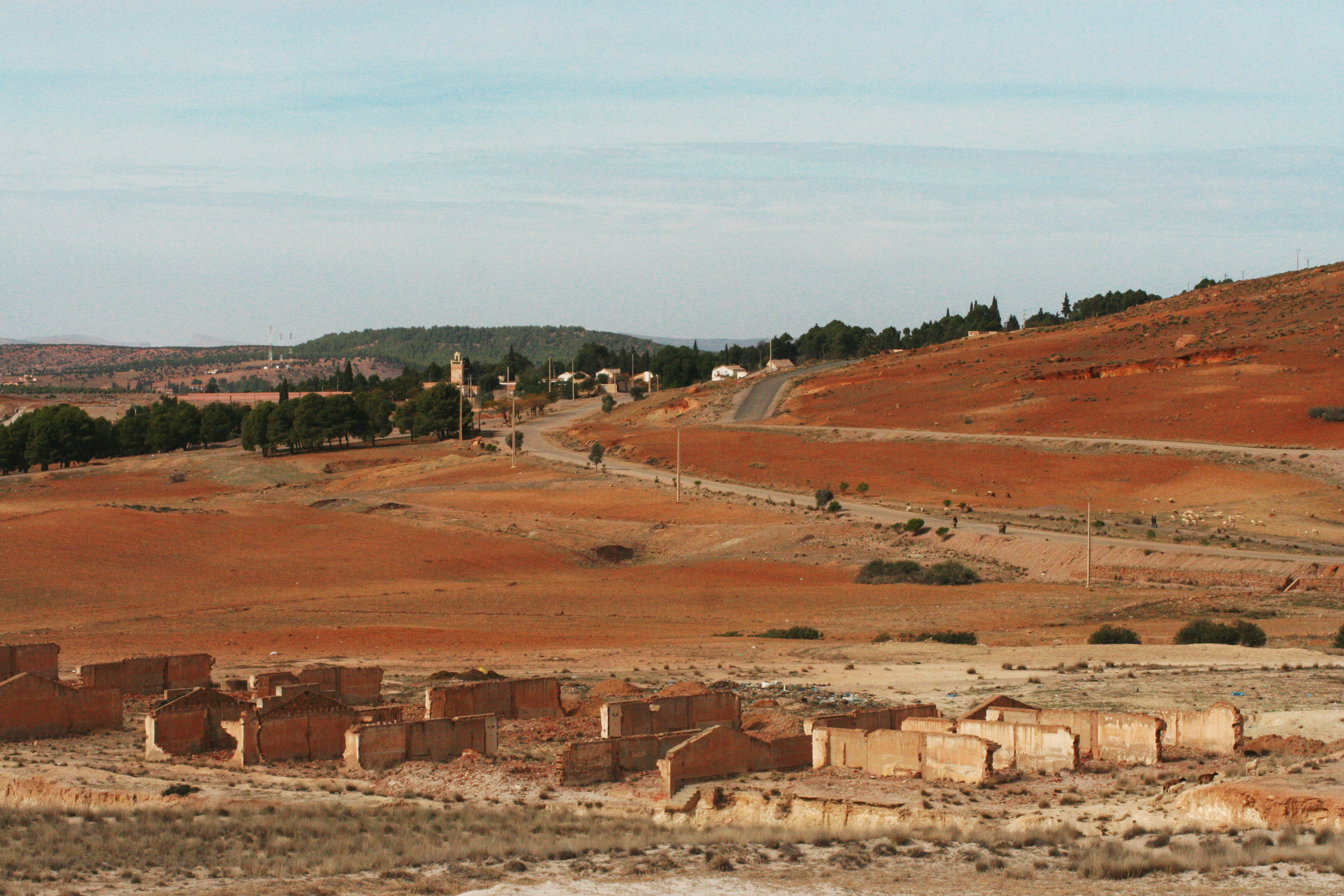
- Nickname: Al kahin
- Interactive map of Sidi Boubker
- Coordinates: 31°49′N 7°04′W
- Country: Morocco
- Region: Oriental
- Province: Jerada

Population (2004)
  - Total: 1,878
- Time zone: UTC+0 (GMT)

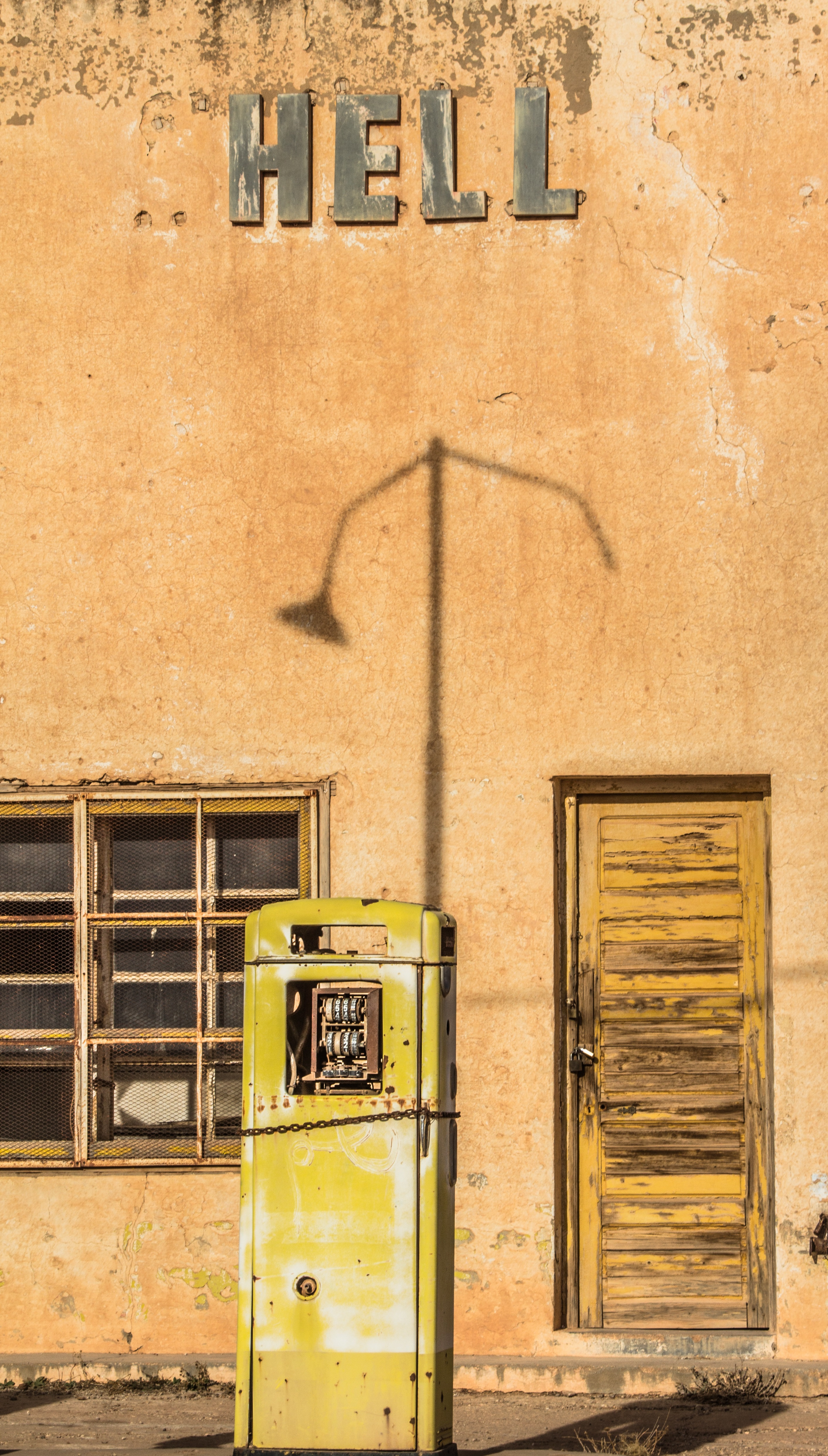
Abandoned gas station.

Sidi Boubker is a town in Jerada Province, Oriental, Morocco. According to the 2004 population census, it has a population of 1,878.
