= Moulay Yacoub =

Moulay Yacoub مولاي يعقوب
- Town
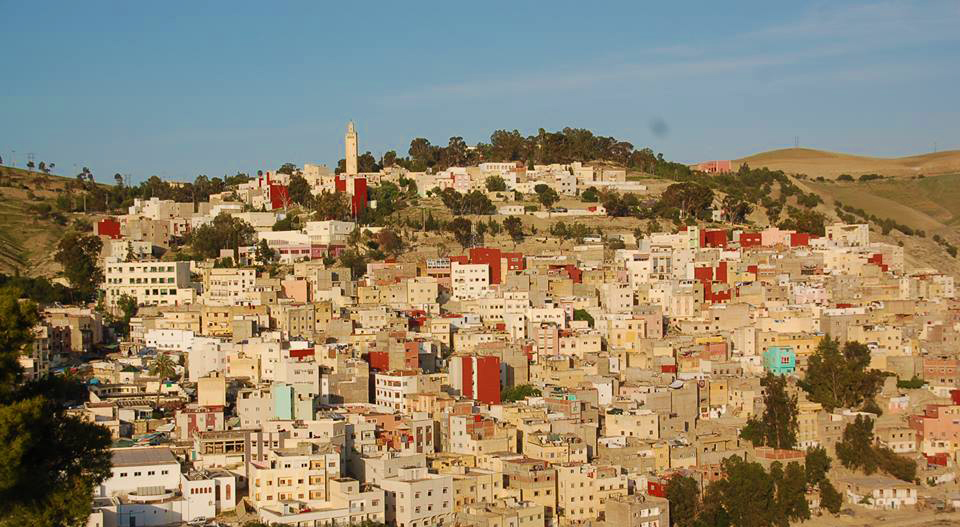
- Interactive map of Moulay Yacoub
- Coordinates: 34.0878°N 5.1811°W
- Country: Morocco
- Region: Fès-Meknès
- Province: Moulay Yacoub

Population (2024)
  - Total: 4,545
- Time zone: UTC+0 (GMT)

Moulay Yacoub (Arabic: مولاي يعقوب mūlāy yaʿqūb) is a spa town and municipality located 21 km northwest of Fez, Morocco. It is the capital of Moulay Yacoub Province and reported a population of 4,545 in the 2024 Moroccan census. The baths use water pumped from 1500 m below ground and reach a temperature of 54 °C.
