= Aousserd =

Aousserd Auserd, Ausert
- Rural commune and town
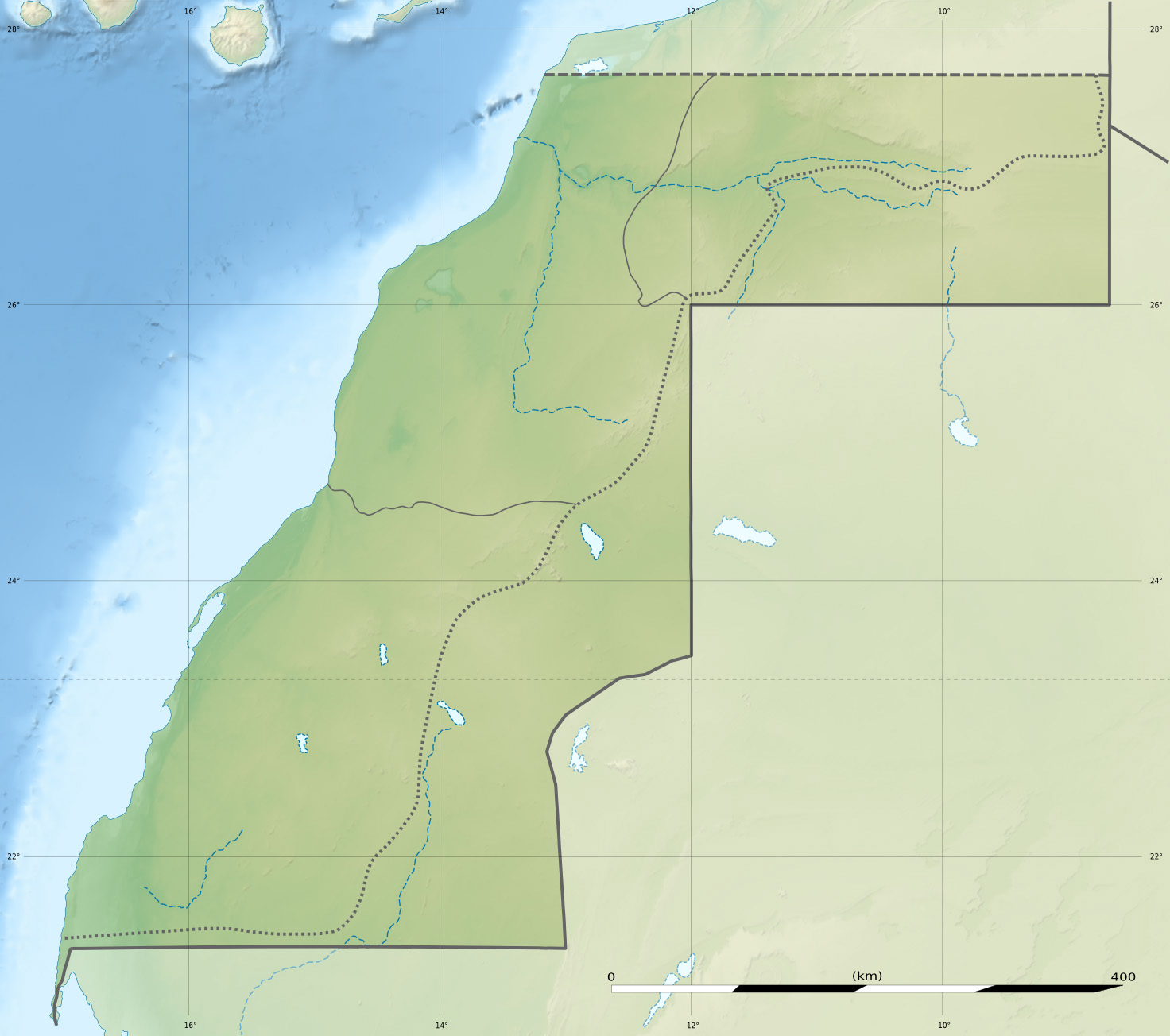
- Location in Western Sahara Aousserd (Africa)
- Coordinates: 22°32′11″N 14°17′9″W
- Territory: Western Sahara
- Claimed by: Morocco, Sahrawi Arab Democratic Republic
- Controlled by: Morocco

Area
  - Total: 135.17 km^{2} (52.19 sq mi)

Population (2004)
  - Total: 5,832
  - Density: 43.15/km^{2} (111.7/sq mi)
- Time zone: UTC+0 (GMT)

Aousserd, Ausert or Auserd is a small town and rural commune in Aousserd Province of the Dakhla-Oued Ed-Dahab region of Western Sahara, disputed between Morocco and the Sahrawi Arab Democratic Republic and under Moroccan occupation. The number of permanent structures in Aousserd is low, as many residents follow the traditionally nomadic Bedouin lifestyle of the Sahrawis, passing through the town only temporarily and living in tents. At the time of the 2004 census, the commune had a total population of 5832 people living in 225 households.

South of Tindouf, Algeria, there is a Sahrawi refugee camp named after Aousserd.
