= Guercif =

Coordinates: 34°14′N 3°22′W

Guercif ڭرسيف ⴳⵔⵙⵉⴼ
- City
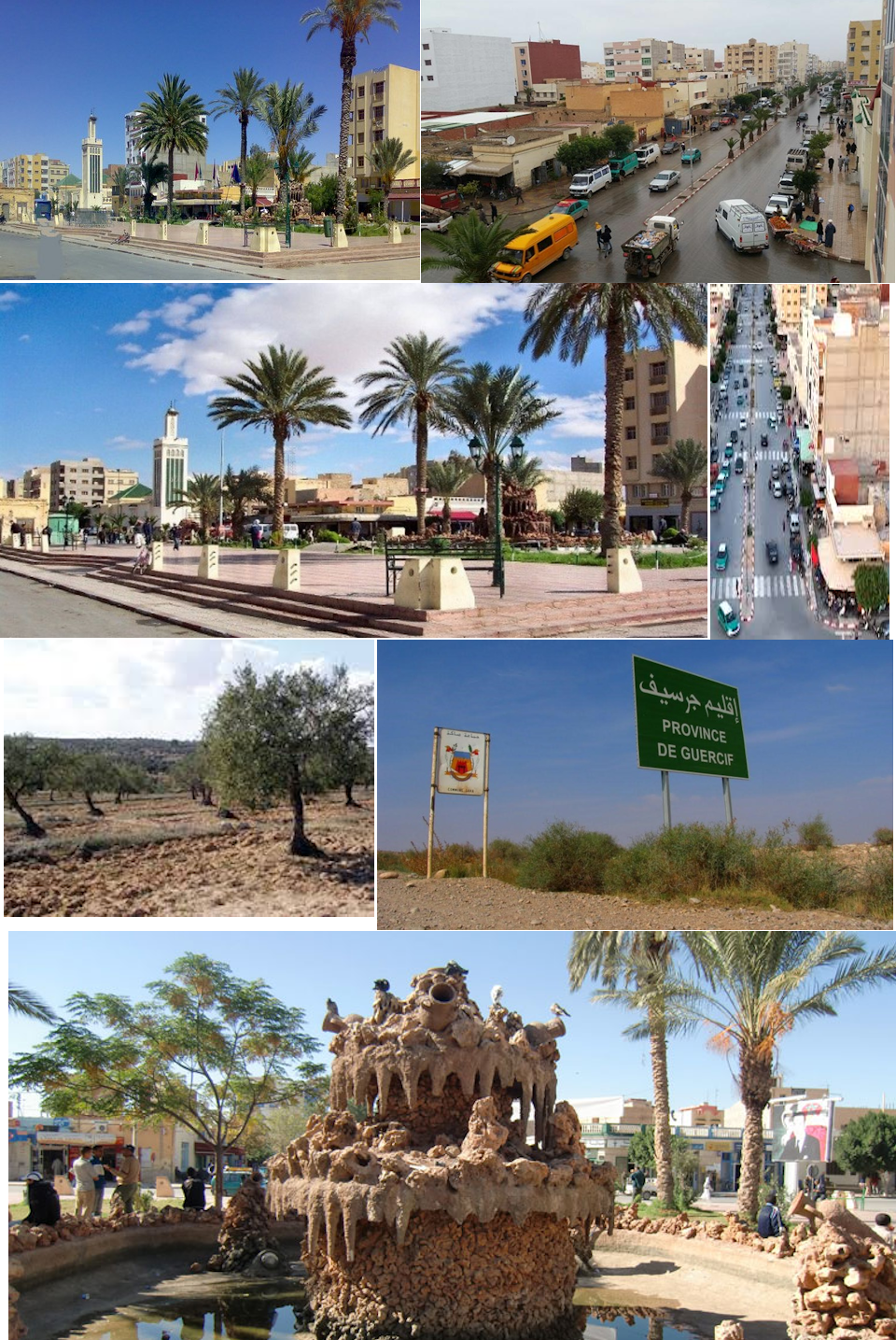
- Interactive map of Guercif
- Country: Morocco
- Region: Oriental
- Province: Guercif

Population (September 2014)
  - Total: 90,880
- Time zone: UTC+0 (GMT)
- Postal code: 31000

Guercif (Arabic: ڭرسيف; Standard Moroccan Tamazight: ⴳⵔⵙⵉⴼ) is a City and municipality in Guercif Province, Oriental, Morocco. It is the province's capital. According to the 2014 census the municipality had a population of 90,880 people living in 18,779 households.

== Nearby cities ==
In the north of the city of Guercif we find the province of Nador, 135 km away, and a distance of 170 km south of the city, we find the city of Mysore on the national road No.15. As for if we go to the west and 65 km away we find the city of Taza. In the east of the city, we find the city of Taourirt, 54 km.

== Economy ==
The city of Guercif depends mainly on its economy on the agricultural sector, as it is considered one of the largest cities in Morocco that produce olives. The city is famous for holding an annual festival called the Olive Festival, and its timing coincides with the city's olive harvest season. In addition to the agricultural sector, trade in the province of Guercif is an essential activity besides agriculture, as its commercial activities are revived during the summer and spring season, and the eastern region and Nador are among the most important resources of this region in importing and promoting commodities within the region ..The city is famous for its weekly market that takes place every Tuesday and one to a permanent market "swi9a"(A small market that stays open all the week) and is considered one of the largest markets in the region where different agricultural products such as vegetables, fruits and livestock are known, and other products such as clothes, appliances, home furniture and used tools ... The traditional industry occupies an important place in economic activity In the region, where it receives great care by the population, especially in its fields related to leather manufacturing, ceramics, carpet making, and the manufacture of the ritual and equipments for equitation related to equestrian rifles, daggers, and dress for mare and knight. Province of Guercif is available. On natural qualifications that can be exploited in mountain tourism, as well as on historical and heritage qualifications that respond to the needs of tourists from historical feats and folklore arts. The city of Guercif connects the cities of Casablanca and Oujda, which makes them economically valuable in the region.

== Transportation ==
There is a city in Guercif, on a bus stop that connects the city with the various regions of Morocco, in addition to a station for large taxis, which contributes to connecting the city with the national road network, and the city contains a train station providing ten daily trips to Oujda, Casablanca, Tangier and various Moroccan cities, and it can also be moved From and to the city of Guercif, through the highway linking the cities of Oujda and Casablanca, which is about 18 kilometers from the city. The population also depends on moving within the city by bus or taxi.

== Growing olives in the city ==
According to the regional directorate of agriculture, the area planted with olive trees in Guercif moved from 5400 hectares to 18,000 hectares during the period from the 1998-1997 agricultural season to the 2009–08 season, with an annual growth of approximately 1150 hectares. The production of olive oil in the Guercif region increased during the same period by 6738 tons, as estimates of the current production approached 30 thousand tons, 80 percent of which was converted into tinners and 20 percent to extract olive oil. It is expected that the cultivation of olive trees will grow under the Millennium Challenge Account program and the Green Morocco Plan. The state subsidy for the acquisition of olive trees is 80 percent of its price.

== Climate ==
Climate data for Guercif
| Month | Jan | Feb | Mar | Apr | May | Jun | Jul | Aug | Sep | Oct | Nov | Dec | Year |
|---|---|---|---|---|---|---|---|---|---|---|---|---|---|
| Record high °C (°F) | 27.6 (81.7) | 32.9 (91.2) | 35.6 (96.1) | 39.9 (103.8) | 41.5 (106.7) | 44.6 (112.3) | 46.9 (116.4) | 46.3 (115.3) | 43.8 (110.8) | 38.4 (101.1) | 32.3 (90.1) | 29.8 (85.6) | 46.9 (116.4) |
| Mean maximum °C (°F) | 21.4 (70.5) | 23.7 (74.7) | 28.8 (83.8) | 31.6 (88.9) | 34.9 (94.8) | 38.7 (101.7) | 42.3 (108.1) | 41.5 (106.7) | 36.6 (97.9) | 32.4 (90.3) | 26.3 (79.3) | 21.6 (70.9) | 42.21 (107.98) |
| Mean daily maximum °C (°F) | 15.3 (59.5) | 17.4 (63.3) | 20.3 (68.5) | 22.9 (73.2) | 26.8 (80.2) | 31.8 (89.2) | 36.2 (97.2) | 36.0 (96.8) | 30.8 (87.4) | 25.7 (78.3) | 19.6 (67.3) | 15.9 (60.6) | 24.9 (76.8) |
| Daily mean °C (°F) | 10.0 (50.0) | 11.8 (53.2) | 14.4 (57.9) | 16.9 (62.4) | 20.5 (68.9) | 25.0 (77.0) | 28.8 (83.8) | 28.9 (84.0) | 24.7 (76.5) | 20.1 (68.2) | 14.5 (58.1) | 10.9 (51.6) | 18.9 (66.0) |
| Mean daily minimum °C (°F) | 4.6 (40.3) | 6.2 (43.2) | 9.5 (49.1) | 10.8 (51.4) | 14.1 (57.4) | 18.1 (64.6) | 21.4 (70.5) | 21.8 (71.2) | 18.6 (65.5) | 14.4 (57.9) | 9.4 (48.9) | 5.9 (42.6) | 12.8 (55.0) |
| Mean minimum °C (°F) | −0.5 (31.1) | 1.8 (35.2) | 3.2 (37.8) | 6.4 (43.5) | 9.4 (48.9) | 14.3 (57.7) | 18.0 (64.4) | 17.9 (64.2) | 13.5 (56.3) | 9.4 (48.9) | 3.5 (38.3) | 0.9 (33.6) | −1.07 (30.07) |
| Record low °C (°F) | −8.5 (16.7) | −4.2 (24.4) | −2.0 (28.4) | −0.5 (31.1) | 2.0 (35.6) | 6.0 (42.8) | 10.5 (50.9) | 8.8 (47.8) | 5.3 (41.5) | 0.0 (32.0) | −2.0 (28.4) | −3.5 (25.7) | −8.5 (16.7) |
| Average precipitation mm (inches) | 20 (0.8) | 24 (0.9) | 30 (1.2) | 27 (1.1) | 23 (0.9) | 8 (0.3) | 3 (0.1) | 6 (0.2) | 16 (0.6) | 27 (1.1) | 30 (1.2) | 19 (0.7) | 233 (9.1) |
| Average precipitation days (≥ 1 mm) | 3 | 4 | 4 | 4 | 3 | 2 | 1 | 1 | 2 | 3 | 4 | 3 | 34 |
| Average relative humidity (%) | 65 | 61 | 55 | 51 | 46 | 40 | 36 | 39 | 50 | 56 | 64 | 69 | 58.7 |
| Average dew point °C (°F) | 3.8 (38.8) | 4.5 (40.1) | 5.7 (42.3) | 6.8 (44.2) | 8.7 (47.7) | 10.9 (51.6) | 11.9 (53.4) | 13.1 (55.6) | 12.9 (55.2) | 10.5 (50.9) | 7.0 (44.6) | 4.8 (40.6) | 8.4 (47.1) |
| Mean monthly sunshine hours | 210.8 | 198.8 | 244.9 | 258.0 | 300.7 | 318.0 | 347.2 | 322.4 | 270.0 | 248.0 | 207.0 | 204.6 | 3,130.4 |
| Percentage possible sunshine | 68.0 | 64.5 | 65.8 | 66.2 | 69.3 | 72.1 | 77.8 | 77.6 | 72.6 | 70.8 | 66.3 | 66.0 | 70.0 |
| Average ultraviolet index | 3 | 5 | 8 | 9 | 11 | 12 | 11 | 10 | 9 | 7 | 5 | 4 | 8 |
Source: Open-Meteo Historical Weather API; WeatherSpark

== Sport ==
Football and handball are the most popular sports among the residents and youth of the city. The city of Guercif is represented by the Hassania Guercif football team (HG) and practiced in the amateur division. The handball team is considered one of the strongest clubs in Morocco in recent years.

== Notable people ==
Allal bin Abdullah was born in the city of Guercif, in the Hawara tribe of Rahu.
