= Mediouna, Morocco =

Mediouna
- Municipality and town
- Interactive map of Mediouna
- Coordinates: 33°27′0″N 7°30′36″W
- Country: Morocco
- Region: Casablanca-Settat
- Province: Médiouna Province
- Elevation: 170 m (560 ft)

Population (2024)
  - Total: 29,972
- Time zone: UTC+0 (GMT)

Mediouna is a town and municipality that serves as the seat of Médiouna Province. It functions as a suburb of Casablanca. It lies along National Route 9, 18.6 kilometres (11.6 mi) southeast of downtown Casablanca. At the time of the 2024 census, the commune had a total population of 29,972 people living in 7,627 households.
