= Mediouna Province =

Province of Morocco

Coordinates: 33.451494°N 7.514992°W

Mediouna Province إقليم مديونة
- Province
- Interactive map of Mediouna Province
- Country: Morocco
- Region: Casablanca-Settat
- Capital: Mediouna

Population (2024)
  - Total: 345,787

Mediouna (Arabic: مديونة) is a province in the Moroccan region of Casablanca-Settat. Its population in 2004 was 345,787.

== Subdivisions ==
The province is divided administratively into the following:

| Name | Geographic code | Type | Households | Population (2004) | Foreign population | Moroccan population | Notes |
|---|---|---|---|---|---|---|---|
| Mediouna | 355.01.03. | Municipality | 2958 | 14712 | 3 | 14709 | |
| Tit Mellil | 355.01.05. | Municipality | 2340 | 11710 | 11 | 11699 | |
| Al Majjatia Oulad Taleb | 355.03.01. | Rural commune | 4711 | 23322 | 3 | 23319 | |
| Lahraouyine | 355.03.03. | Rural commune | 10806 | 52862 | 1 | 52861 | 47261 residents live in the center, called Lahraouyine; 5601 residents live in rural areas. |
| Sidi Hajjaj Oued Hassar | 355.03.05. | Rural commune | 3723 | 20245 | 2 | 20243 | |
