= Guercif Province =

Coordinates: 34.1359°N 3.2055°W

Guercif Province إقليم جرسيف ⵜⴰⵙⴳⴰ ⵏ ⴳⵔⵙⵉⴼ
- Province
- Interactive map of Guercif Province
- Country: Morocco
- Region: Oriental
- Capital: Guercif

Area
  - Total: 7,307 km^{2} (2,821 sq mi)

Population (2014)
  - Total: 216,717

Guercif (Arabic: إقليم جرسيف, Standard Moroccan Tamazight: ⵜⴰⵙⴳⴰ ⵏ ⴳⵔⵙⵉⴼ) is a province in the eastern part of the Oriental region of Morocco. It was formed in 2009. The provincial capital is Guercif.

== Administrative divisions ==
Guercif province is divided into 1 municipality (Urban commune) and 9 communes (Rural communes).

=== Municipalities ===
- Guercif

=== Rural communes ===
- Assebbab
- Barkine
- Houara Oulad Raho
- Lamrija
- Mazguitam
- Oulad Bourima
- Ras Laksar
- Saka
- Taddart
