= Moulay Yacoub Province =

Province of Morocco

Coordinates: 34°05′N 5°10′W

- Province
- Shrine of Sidi Ahmed El Bernoussi
- Interactive map of Moulay Yacoub Province
- Country: Morocco
- Region: Fès-Meknès
- Seat: Moulay Yacoub

Population (2024)
  - Total: 216,954

Moulay Yacoub Province (مولاي يعقوب) is an administrative subdivision of Morocco located in the Fès-Meknès region. Its capital is the town of Moulay Yacoub.

== Geography ==
Moulay Yacoub Province surrounds the city Fes from every direction except south-east, with most of the province situated north-west from Fes, in an area characterized by hilly landscapes and agricultural land. The territory is predominantly rural, with few urban centers aside from Ain Chkef, a Suburb south of Fes.

The region benefits from favorable conditions for agriculture, particularly cereal cultivation and livestock farming.

== History ==
The province takes its name from the town of Moulay Yacoub, known for its thermal springs, which have been used for several centuries. These waters have contributed to the development of thermal and tourism activities in the area.

Administratively, the province was created as part of territorial reorganizations aimed at strengthening local governance and supporting regional development.

== Economy ==
The province’s economy is mainly based on agriculture, particularly cereal production and livestock farming.

Thermal tourism also represents an important activity, linked to the Moulay Yacoub spa facilities, which attract visitors from across the country.

== Administrative organization ==
The province is composed of several urban and rural municipalities. The town of Moulay Yacoub serves as its administrative center.

== Subdivisions ==
The province is divided administratively into the following:

Name	Geographic code	Type	Households	Population (2004)	Foreign population	Moroccan population	Notes
Moulay Yacoub	591.01.01.	Municipality	736	3153	5	3148	
Ain Chkef	591.03.01.	Rural commune	6093	36368	5	36363	
Mikkes	591.03.03.	Rural commune	979	6773	0	6773	
Sebaa Rouadi	591.03.05.	Rural commune	3103	20695	0	20695	
Sebt Loudaya	591.03.07.	Rural commune	1689	12232	0	12232	
Ain Bou Ali	591.05.01.	Rural commune	1881	12269	0	12269	
Ain Kansra	591.05.02.	Rural commune	1850	11534	1	11533	
Laajajra	591.05.03.	Rural commune	1901	13931	0	13931	
Louadaine	591.05.05.	Rural commune	1775	11283	0	11283	
Oulad Mimoun	591.05.07.	Rural commune	1486	9393	0	9393	
Sidi Daoud	591.05.09.	Rural commune	1822	12791	0	12791	
