= Jerada Province =

Coordinates: 34°18′42″N 2°09′49″W

Jerada Province إقليم جرادة ⵜⴰⵙⴳⴰ ⵏ ⵊⵕⴰⴹⴰ
- Province
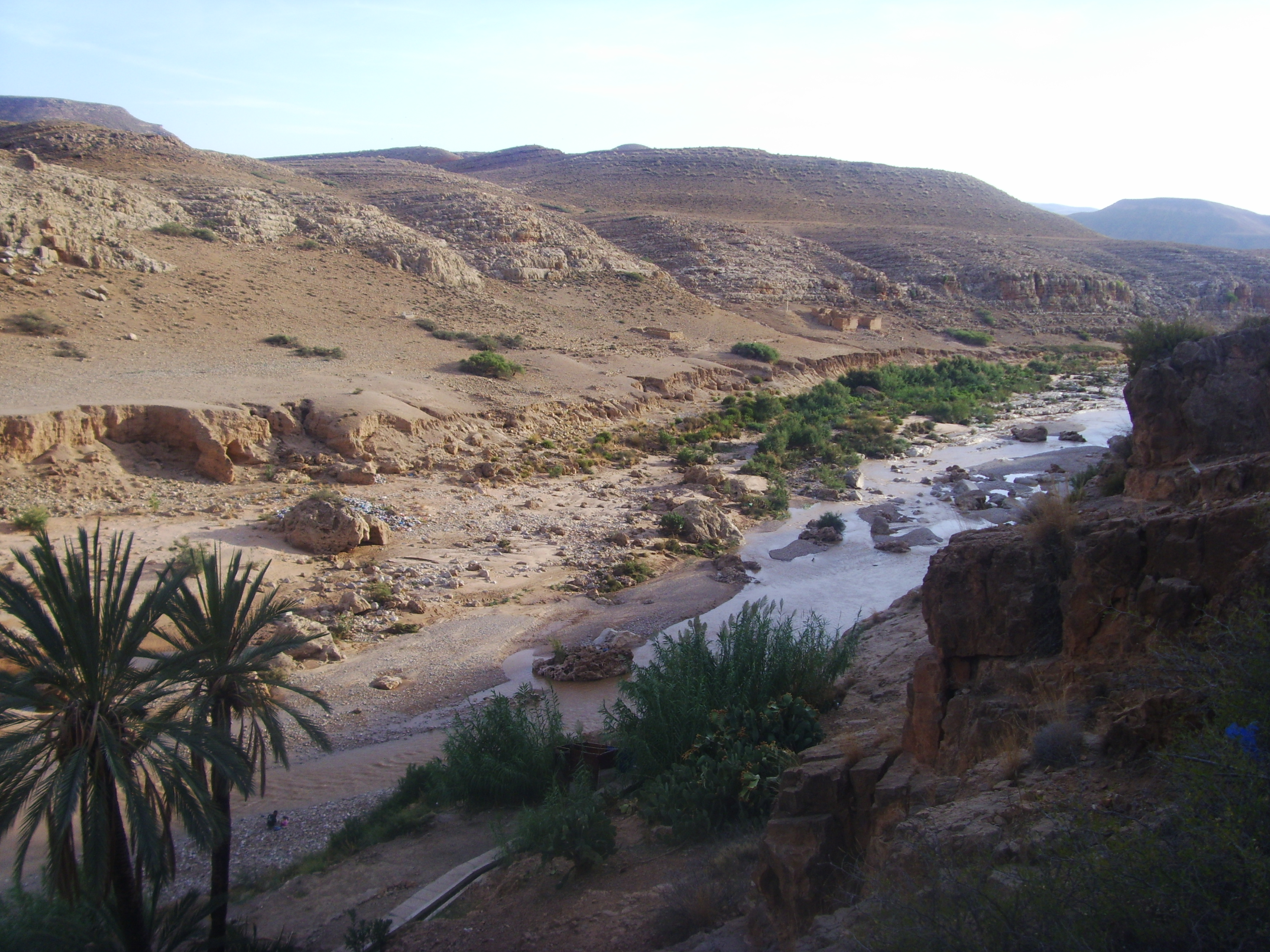
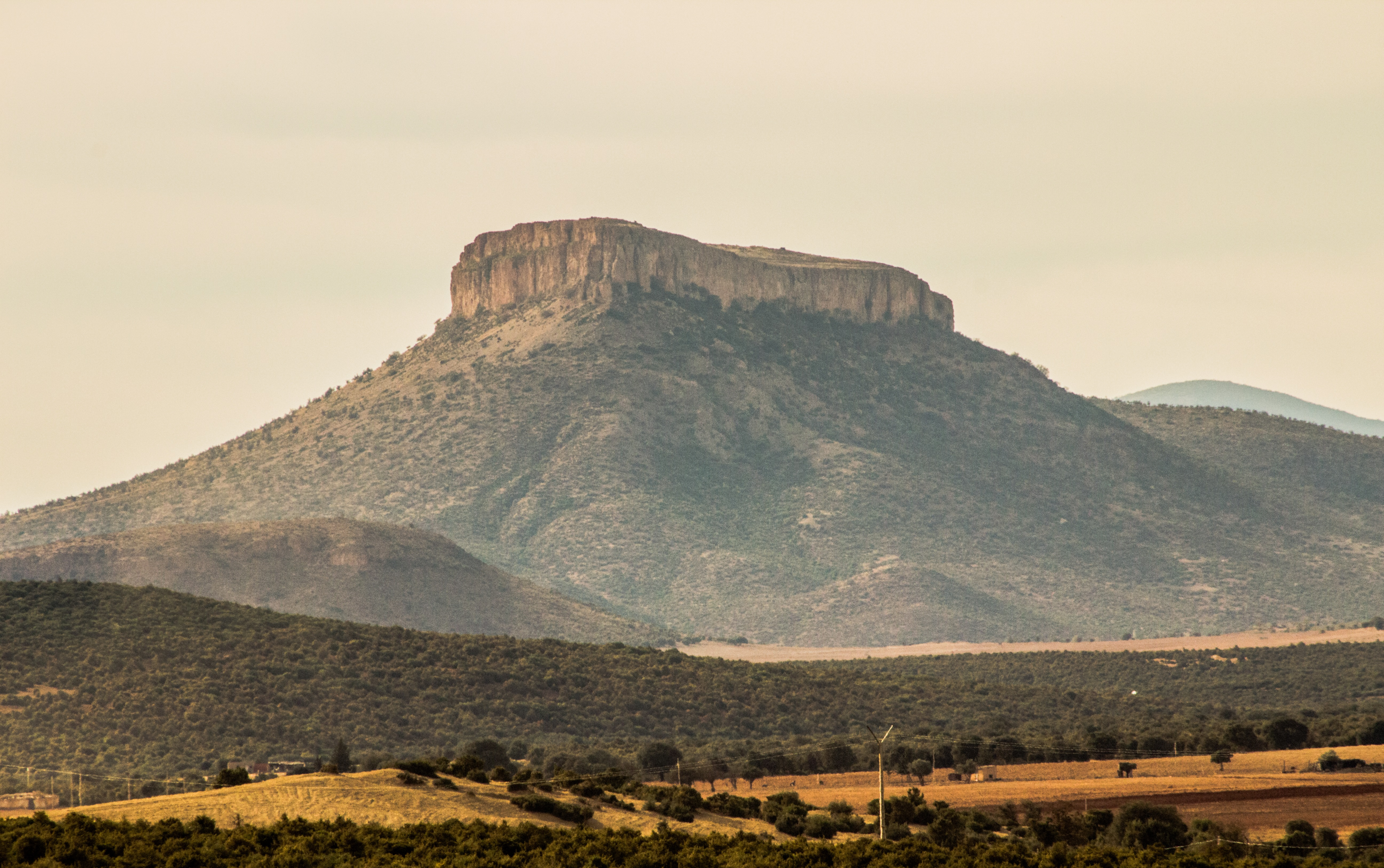
- Interactive map of Jerada Province
- Country: Morocco
- Region: Oriental
- Seat: Jerada

Population (2024)
  - Total: 101,559

Jerada Province (Arabic: جرادة, Standard Moroccan Tamazight: ⵊⵕⴰⴹⴰ) is a province of the Oriental Region in Morocco. According to the 2024 census, it had a population of 101,559.

== Geography ==
The province is located in the eastern part of Morocco, within the Oriental Region.

== Urban centres ==
The main cities and towns of the province include:

- Ain Bni Mathar
- Jerada
- Touissit

== Subdivisions ==
The province is divided administratively into the following:

Name	Geographic code	Type	Households	Population (2004)	Foreign population	Moroccan population	Notes
Ain Bni Mathar	275.01.03.	Municipality	2519	13526	85	13441	
Jerada	275.01.17.	Municipality	8120	43916	46	43870	
Touissit	275.01.35.	Municipality	716	3429	9	3420	
Gafait	275.03.03.	Rural commune	441	2654	1	2653	
Guenfouda	275.03.05.	Rural commune	1009	5748	11	5737	
Laaouinate	275.03.07.	Rural commune	628	3790	1	3789	
Lebkhata	275.03.09.	Rural commune	371	2546	0	2546	
Ras Asfour	275.03.13.	Rural commune	273	1694	15	1679	
Sidi Boubker	275.03.15.	Rural commune	547	2807	8	2799	1942 residents live in the center, called Sidi Boubker e; 865 residents live in rural areas.
Tiouli	275.03.21.	Rural commune	1019	6317	104	6213	1997 residents live in the center, called Oued Heimer; 4320 residents live in rural areas.
Bni Mathar	275.05.01.	Rural commune	1152	7089	7	7082	
Mrija	275.05.11.	Rural commune	453	2841	1	2840	
Oulad Ghziyel	275.05.13.	Rural commune	819	6488	2	6486	
Oulad Sidi Abdelhakem	275.05.15.	Rural commune	401	2995	18	2977	
