= Aousserd Province =

Province of Morocco

Coordinates: 20°49′59″N 17°06′00″W

Aousserd (Arabic: أوسرد) is a province in the region of Dakhla-Oued Ed-Dahab, in the Moroccan-occupied territory of Western Sahara. At the 2004 Census it had a population of 7,689.

== Subdivisions ==
The prefecture is divided administratively into the following:

| Name | Geographic code | Type | Households | Population (2004) | Foreign population | Moroccan settlers | Notes |
|---|---|---|---|---|---|---|---|
| La Güera | 066.01.03. | Municipality | 684 | 3726 | 5 | 3721 | Now abandoned |
| Aghouinite | 066.03.03. | Rural commune | 43 | 222 | 0 | 222 | |
| Aousserd | 066.03.05. | Rural commune | 225 | 5832 | 3 | 5829 | |
| Tichla | 066.03.07. | Rural commune | 102 | 6036 | 8 | 6028 | |
| Zoug | 066.03.09. | Rural commune | 149 | 833 | 1 | 832 | |
| Bir Gandouz | 066.05.03. | Rural commune | 298 | 3864 | 16 | 3848 | |
