= Es Semara Province =

Coordinates: 26°44′22″N 11°40′13″W

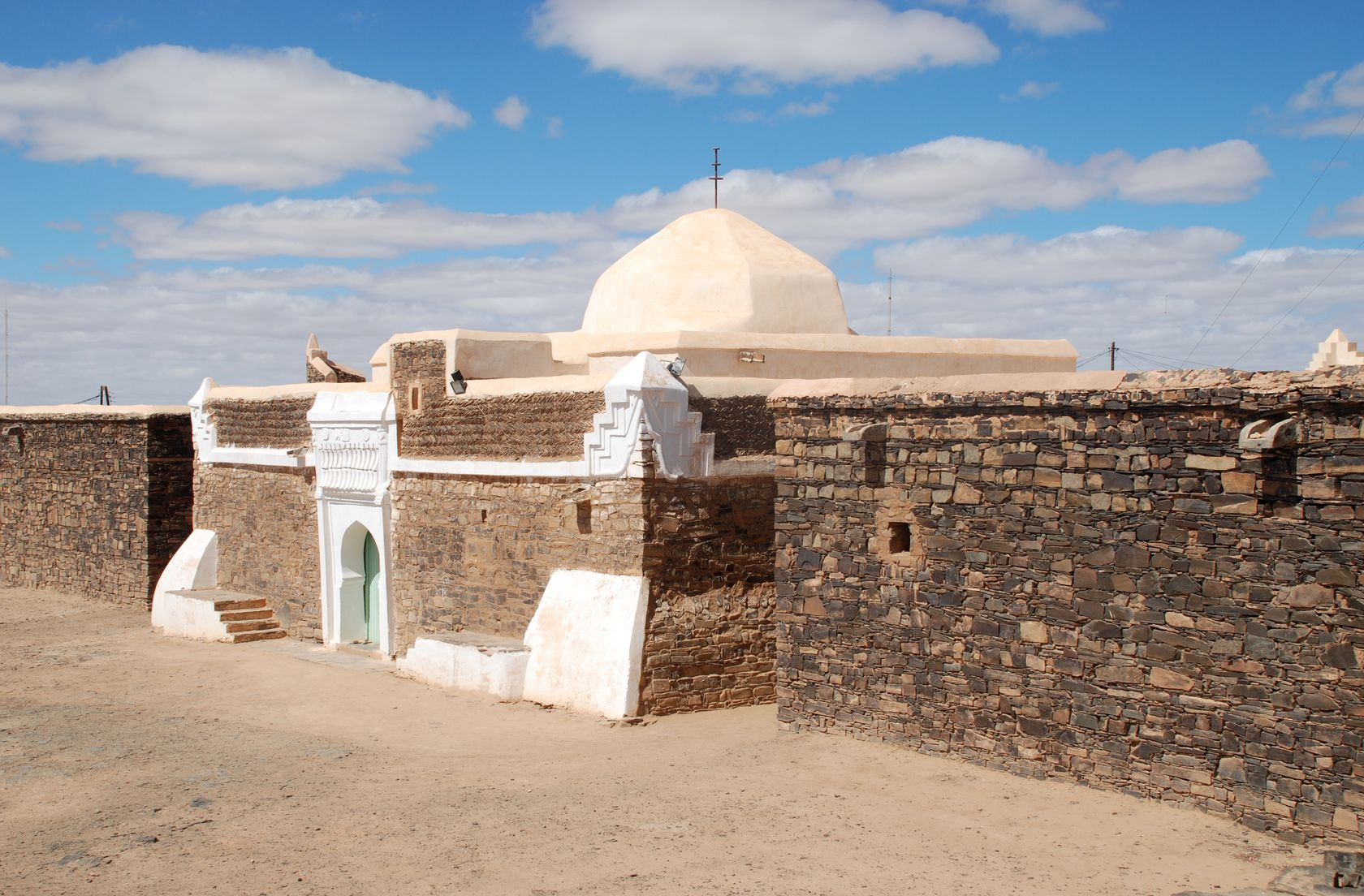
Smara, Zawiya of cheikh Ma al-'Aynayn

Es Semara Province in Laâyoune-Sakia El Hamra

Es Semara (Arabic: السمارة; Spanish: Provincia de Esmara) is a province in the region of Laâyoune-Sakia El Hamra, in the disputed territory of Western Sahara. The northern and western half of the province is occupied by Morocco, while the southern and eastern part is controlled by the Sahrawi Republic. Its population in 2004 was 60,426. Its major town is Es Semara.

== Subdivisions ==
The province is divided administratively into the following:

Name	Geographic code	Type	Households	Population	Foreign population	Moroccan settlers	Notes
Es Semara	221.01.01.	Municipality	7300	40347	7	40340	
Amgala	221.03.01.	Rural commune	226	4398	1	4397	
Haouza	221.03.03.	Rural commune	498	8769	1	8768	
Jdiriya	221.03.05.	Rural commune	421	2000	0	2000	
Sidi Ahmed Laaroussi	221.03.07.	Rural commune	388	1820	0	1820	
Tifariti	221.03.09.	Rural commune	700	3092	2	3090	
