= Dakhla-Oued Ed-Dahab =

Region of Western Sahara

Dakhla-Oued Ed-Dahab Region جهة الداخلة وادي الذهب (Arabic) ⵜⴰⵎⵏⴰⴹⵜ ⵏ ⴷⴷⴰⵅⵍⴰ ⵡⴰⴷ ⴷⴷⴰⵀⴰⴱ (Standard Moroccan Tamazight) Región de Dajla-Río de Oro
- Region (disputed)
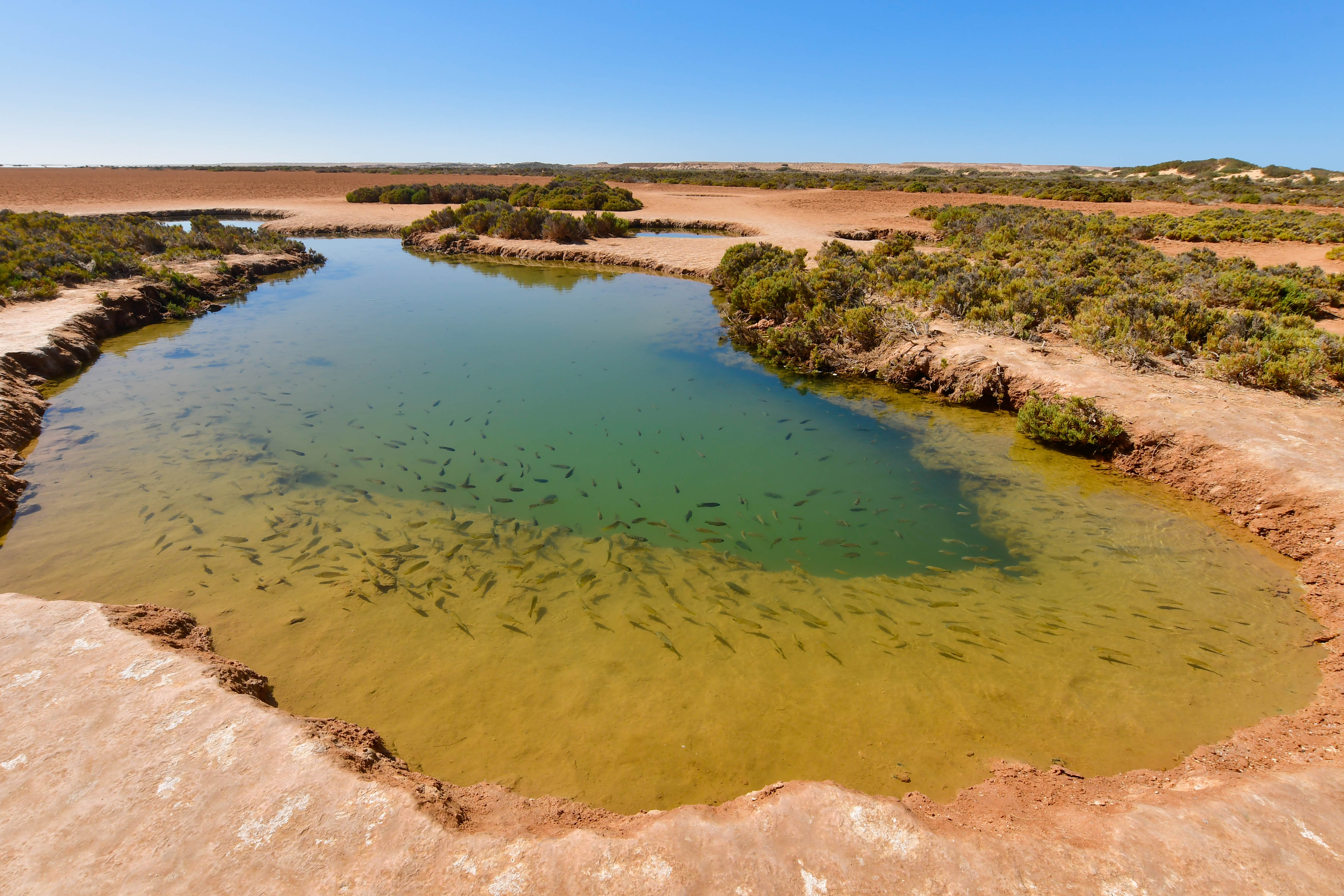

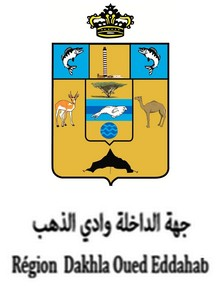
- Seal

- Location in territory claimed by Morocco
- Coordinates: 23°0′N 15°0′W
- Countries: Morocco; Sahrawi Arab Democratic Republic
- Capital: Dakhla

Government
  - Type: Governor–regional council
  - Wali: Ali Khalil
  - President: Yanja Khattat (PI)

Area
  - Total: 142,865 km^{2} (55,160 sq mi)

Population (2024)
  - Total: 219,965
  - Rank: 12th out of 12 Regions
  - Density: 1.53967/km^{2} (3.98773/sq mi)
- Time zone: UTC+0 (GMT)
- ISO 3166 code: MA-12

Dakhla-Oued Ed-Dahab (Note: Arabic: الداخلة - وادي الذهب, romanized: ad-dāḵla - wādī ḏ-ḏahab Standard Moroccan Tamazight: ⴷⴷⴰⵅⵍⴰ ⵡⴰⴷ ⴷⴷⴰⵀⴰⴱ) is one of the twelve regions of Morocco. Before September 2015, it was known as Oued Ed-Dahab-Lagouira (Arabic: وادي الذهب لكويرة). It is situated in the disputed territory of Western Sahara, considered by Morocco to be the southern part of the country. The Polisario Front and other independence-seeking Sahrawis consider this to be a part of the Sahrawi Arab Democratic Republic. The United Nations and most countries do not recognize Moroccan sovereignty over the area.

The region covers an area of 50,880 km^{2} and had a population of 219,965 according to the 2024 Moroccan census. The capital is the coastal city of Dakhla, formerly known as Villa Cisneros.

The region comprises two provinces.

== History ==
On 15 December 2023, the Polisario Front carried out an operation in the Aousserd Province of the region, dropping four explosive projectiles 6 kilometres (3.7 mi) away from residential areas that did not cause any casualties.

== Subdivisions ==
Provinces of Dakhla-Oued EdDahab

Dakhla-Oued Ed-Dahab consists of two provinces:

- Aousserd Province
- Oued Ed-Dahab Province

== Government ==
=== Regional leadership ===
Wali of Dakhla-Oued Ed-Dahab since 2015
Name	Position held	Under
Lamine Benomar	2015–2023	King Mohammed VI
Ali Khalil	2023–present	King Mohammed VI

Regional Council Presidents of Dakhla-Oued Ed-Dahab since 2015
Name	Position held	Party	Under
Yanja El Khattat	2015–present	PI	King Mohammed VI
