= Prefectures and provinces of Morocco =

Prefectures and provinces of Morocco عمالات وأقاليم المغرب (Arabic) ⵜⵉⵎⵏⴱⴰⴹⵉⵏ ⴷ ⵜⵙⴳⵉⵡⵉⵏ ⵏ ⵍⵎⵖⵔⵉⴱ (Standard Moroccan Tamazight)
- Map of the Prefectures and provinces of Morocco (including Western Sahara, a disputed territory)
- Category: Unitary state
- Location: Kingdom of Morocco
- Number: 75
- Populations: 16,228 (Tarfaya Province) – 3,218,036 (Casablanca Prefecture)
- Government: Prefectural or Provincial councils
- Subdivisions: Municipalities, communes, and arrondissements

The 12 Regions of Morocco are subdivided into 75 second-level administrative divisions, known as prefectures and provinces. These consist of 13 prefectures and 62 provinces.

Each prefecture or province is further subdivided into several types of administrative units. In urban areas, these include arrondissements (mainly within large metropolitan prefectures) and municipalities (communes, singular commune), also referred to as urban municipalities (communes urbaines). In rural areas, provinces and prefectures are divided into districts (cercles, singular cercle), which are themselves subdivided into rural municipalities (communes rurales, singular commune rurale).

One prefecture, Casablanca, is additionally subdivided into préfectures d'arrondissements (singular préfecture d'arrondissements), which function in a manner similar to districts (cercles), but group together several arrondissements instead of rural municipalities.

Administrative divisions of Morocco (2015)

== List of prefectures and provinces ==
Location	Region	Province / Prefecture	Seat
Mainland Morocco	Béni Mellal-Khénifra Region	Azilal Province	Azilal
Mainland Morocco	Béni Mellal-Khénifra Region	Beni Mellal Province	Beni Mellal
Mainland Morocco	Béni Mellal-Khénifra Region	Fquih Ben Salah Province	Fquih Ben Salah
Mainland Morocco	Béni Mellal-Khénifra Region	Khénifra Province	Khenifra
Mainland Morocco	Béni Mellal-Khénifra Region	Khouribga Province	Khouribga
Mainland Morocco	Casablanca-Settat Region	Benslimane Province	Benslimane
Mainland Morocco	Casablanca-Settat Region	Berrechid Province	Berrechid
Mainland Morocco	Casablanca-Settat Region	Casablanca Prefecture	Casablanca
Mainland Morocco	Casablanca-Settat Region	El Jadida Province	El Jadida
Mainland Morocco	Casablanca-Settat Region	Mediouna Province	Mediouna
Mainland Morocco	Casablanca-Settat Region	Mohammedia Prefecture	Mohammedia
Mainland Morocco	Casablanca-Settat Region	Nouaceur Province	Nouaceur
Mainland Morocco	Casablanca-Settat Region	Settat Province	Settat
Mainland Morocco	Casablanca-Settat Region	Sidi Bennour Province	Sidi Bennour
Mainland Morocco	Drâa-Tafilalet Region	Errachidia Province	Errachidia
Mainland Morocco	Drâa-Tafilalet Region	Midelt Province	Midelt
Mainland Morocco	Drâa-Tafilalet Region	Ouarzazate Province	Ouarzazate
Mainland Morocco	Drâa-Tafilalet Region	Tinghir Province	Tinghir
Mainland Morocco	Drâa-Tafilalet Region	Zagora Province	Zagora
Mainland Morocco	Fez-Meknes Region	Boulemane Province	Missour
Mainland Morocco	Fez-Meknes Region	El Hajeb Province	El Hajeb
Mainland Morocco	Fez-Meknes Region	Fez Prefecture	Fez
Mainland Morocco	Fez-Meknes Region	Ifrane Province	Ifrane
Mainland Morocco	Fez-Meknes Region	Meknes Prefecture	Meknes
Mainland Morocco	Fez-Meknes Region	Moulay Yacoub Province	Moulay Yacoub
Mainland Morocco	Fez-Meknes Region	Sefrou Province	Sefrou
Mainland Morocco	Fez-Meknes Region	Taounate Province	Taounate
Mainland Morocco	Fez-Meknes Region	Taza Province	Taza
Mainland Morocco	Marrakesh-Safi Region	Al Haouz Province	Tahannaout
Mainland Morocco	Marrakesh-Safi Region	Chichaoua Province	Chichaoua
Mainland Morocco	Marrakesh-Safi Region	Kalaat Sraghna Province	Kalaat Sraghna
Mainland Morocco	Marrakesh-Safi Region	Essaouira Province	Essaouira
Mainland Morocco	Marrakesh-Safi Region	Marrakesh Prefecture	Marrakesh
Mainland Morocco	Marrakesh-Safi Region	Rehamna Province	Benguerir
Mainland Morocco	Marrakesh-Safi Region	Safi Province	Safi
Mainland Morocco	Marrakesh-Safi Region	Youssoufia Province	Youssoufia
Mainland Morocco	Oriental Region	Berkane Province	Berkane
Mainland Morocco	Oriental Region	Driouch Province	Driouch
Mainland Morocco	Oriental Region	Figuig Province	Bouarfa
Mainland Morocco	Oriental Region	Guercif Province	Guercif
Mainland Morocco	Oriental Region	Jerada Province	Jerada
Mainland Morocco	Oriental Region	Nador Province	Nador
Mainland Morocco	Oriental Region	Oujda-Angad Prefecture	Oujda
Mainland Morocco	Oriental Region	Taourirt Province	Taourirt
Mainland Morocco	Rabat-Salé-Kénitra	Kenitra Province	Kenitra
Mainland Morocco	Rabat-Salé-Kénitra	Khemisset Province	Khemisset
Mainland Morocco	Rabat-Salé-Kénitra	Rabat Prefecture	Rabat
Mainland Morocco	Rabat-Salé-Kénitra	Salé Prefecture	Salé
Mainland Morocco	Rabat-Salé-Kénitra	Sidi Kacem Province	Sidi Kacem
Mainland Morocco	Rabat-Salé-Kénitra	Sidi Slimane Province	Sidi Slimane
Mainland Morocco	Rabat-Salé-Kénitra	Skhirate-Témara Prefecture	Temara
Mainland Morocco	Souss-Massa Region	Agadir-Ida Ou Tanane Prefecture	Agadir
Mainland Morocco	Souss-Massa Region	Chtouka-Ait Baha Province	Biougra
Mainland Morocco	Souss-Massa Region	Inezgane-Ait Melloul Prefecture	Inezgane
Mainland Morocco	Souss-Massa Region	Taroudant Province	Taroudant
Mainland Morocco	Souss-Massa Region	Tata Province	Tata
Mainland Morocco	Souss-Massa Region	Tiznit Province	Tiznit
Mainland Morocco	Tangier-Tétouan-Al Hoceima Region	Al Hoceima Province	Al Hoceima
Mainland Morocco	Tangier-Tétouan-Al Hoceima Region	Chefchaouen Province	Chefchaouen
Mainland Morocco	Tangier-Tétouan-Al Hoceima Region	Fahs-Anjra Province	Anjra
Mainland Morocco	Tangier-Tétouan-Al Hoceima Region	Larache Province	Larache
Mainland Morocco	Tangier-Tétouan-Al Hoceima Region	M'diq-Fnideq Prefecture	M'diq
Mainland Morocco	Tangier-Tétouan-Al Hoceima Region	Ouezzane Province	Ouazzane
Mainland Morocco	Tangier-Tétouan-Al Hoceima Region	Tangier-Assilah Prefecture	Tangier
Mainland Morocco	Tangier-Tétouan-Al Hoceima Region	Tetouan Province	Tetouan
Western Sahara (partly controlled)	Dakhla-Oued Ed-Dahab Region	Aousserd Province	Aousserd
Western Sahara (partly controlled)	Dakhla-Oued Ed-Dahab Region	Oued Ed-Dahab Province	Dakhla
Western Sahara (partly controlled)	Guelmim-Oued Noun Region	Assa-Zag Province	Assa
Western Sahara (partly controlled)	Guelmim-Oued Noun Region	Guelmim Province	Guelmim
Western Sahara (partly controlled)	Guelmim-Oued Noun Region	Sidi Ifni Province	Sidi Ifni
Western Sahara (partly controlled)	Guelmim-Oued Noun Region	Tan-Tan Province	Tan-Tan
Western Sahara (partly controlled)	Laâyoune-Sakia El Hamra Region	Boujdour Province	Boujdour
Western Sahara (partly controlled)	Laâyoune-Sakia El Hamra Region	Es Semara Province	Smara
Western Sahara (partly controlled)	Laâyoune-Sakia El Hamra Region	Laâyoune Province	Laayoune
Western Sahara (partly controlled)	Laâyoune-Sakia El Hamra Region	Tarfaya Province	Tarfaya

=== Western Sahara (most under de facto Moroccan administration) ===
Most of Western Sahara is administered de facto by Morocco (where the area is informally named the Southern Provinces by the Moroccan government and media); the rest is administered by the Sahrawi Arab Democratic Republic.

The United Nations considers the territory to be disputed, as it was not legally transferred by Spain when it abandoned its former colony in 1975, and several states (notably members of the African Union) either recognize the SADR as the sole legitimate government of Western Sahara, or consider that the status of the region (either as an independent state, or as part of Morocco, or as part of Mauritania that initially claimed a part of it) has still not been autodetermined by the local population prior to its annexation. The United Nations has no legal instruments confirming the claims on the region made by the governments of Morocco or the self-proclaimed SADR, and in international treaties, it is still a formal part of Spain that remains to be properly decolonized, even though Spain and Mauritania no longer claim any part of it.

Since the annexation, the situation is worsened by the fact that most of the historic Western Saharan population has fled either to the remaining free zone (now isolated by the Moroccan militarized berm) or to refugee camps in neighbouring countries (notably Algeria), due to lack of resources in the free zone. The remaining native Western Saharan population now lives as a minority among the new Moroccan occupants. The absence of a legal government with a permanent administration in the free zone has also introduced a threat to the security of the surrounding countries in the Saharan and Sahel regions, including Morocco itself.

== Before 2015 ==
=== Mainland Morocco ===
==== Chaouia-Ouardigha Region ====
- Ben Slimane Province
- Berrechid Province
- Khouribga Province
- Settat Province

==== Greater Casablanca Region ====
- Prefecture of Casablanca
- Prefecture of Mohammedia
- Médiouna Province
- Nouaceur Province

==== Tadla-Azilal Region ====
- Azilal Province
- Béni-Mellal Province
- Fquih Ben Salah Province

==== Doukkala-Abda Region ====
- El Jadida Province
- Safi Province
- Sidi Bennour Province
- Youssoufia Province

==== Marrakesh-Tensift-El Haouz Region ====
- Prefecture of Marrakesh-Medina
- Prefecture of Marrakesh-Menara
- Prefecture of Sidi Youssef Ben Ali
- Al Haouz Province
- Chichaoua Province
- El Kelâat Es-Sraghna Province
- Essaouira Province
- Rehamna Province

==== Fès-Boulemane Region ====
- Prefecture of Fès-Dar-Dbibegh
- Moulay Yacoub Province
- Sefrou Province
- Boulemane Province

==== Taza-Al Hoceima-Taounate Region ====
- Al Hoceïma Province
- Taounate Province
- Taza Province
- Guercif Province

==== Gharb-Chrarda-Béni Hssen Region ====
- Kénitra Province
- Sidi Kacem Province
- Sidi Slimane Province

==== Rabat-Salé-Zemmour-Zaer Region ====
- Prefecture of Rabat
- Prefecture of Salé
- Prefecture of Skhirat-Témara
- Khémisset Province

==== Tangier-Tétouan Region ====
- Tangier Sub-Region
  - Prefecture of Tangier-Assilah
  - Fahs-Anjra Province
- Tétouan Sub-Region
  - Prefecture of M'diq-Fnideq
  - Chefchaouen Province
  - Larache Province
  - Ouezzane Province
  - Tétouan Province

==== Oriental Region ====
- Prefecture of Oujda-Angad
- Berkane Province
- Driouch Province
- Figuig Province
- Jerada Province
- Nador Province
- Taourirt Province

==== Meknès-Tafilalet Region ====
- Prefecture of Meknès
- El Hajeb Province
- Errachidia Province
- Ifrane Province
- Khénifra Province
- Midelt Province

==== Souss-Massa-Drâa Region ====
- Prefecture of Agadir-Ida Ou Tanane
- Prefecture of Inezgane-Aït Melloul
- Chtouka Aït Baha Province
- Ouarzazate Province
- Taroudant Province
- Zagora Province
- Sidi Ifni Province
- Tiznit Province
- Tinghir Province

=== Moroccan Sahara (most under de facto Moroccan administration) ===
==== Guelmim-Es Semara Region ====
- Assa-Zag Province (located in Mainland Morocco)
- Es Semara Province
- Guelmim Province (located in Mainland Morocco)
- Tan-Tan Province (located in Mainland Morocco)
- Tata Province (located in Mainland Morocco)

==== Laâyoune-Boujdour-Sakia El Hamra Region ====
- Boujdour Province
- Laâyoune Province
- Tarfaya Province

==== Oued Ed-Dahab-Lagouira Region ====
- Aousserd Province
- Oued Ed-Dahab Province

== See also ==
- Regions of Morocco
- List of administrative divisions of Morocco by population (2004)
- List of administrative divisions of Morocco by area (2004)
- ISO 3166-2:MA (2004)
