= Oriental Desert Express =

Tourist train in Morocco

External image
- Images of the train in 2017 (via AFP)

The rail network of Morocco, c. 2012. The Oriental Desert Express runs along the far east north–south line.

The Oriental Desert Express is a privately chartered tourist train offered between Oujda and Bouarfa, Morocco. It runs along a little-used railway line, and was featured in the 2015 film Spectre.

== History ==
The 305-kilometre (190 mi) line used by the Oriental Desert Express was originally built in the 1920s and 1930s as part of the Mediterranean–Niger Railway, but is now only used twice a week by trains carrying zinc, lead, and copper from local mines. Edi Kunz, a Swiss citizen living in Morocco, learned of the line and worked with Moroccan authorities for three years to start a tourist train along it, overcoming questions from the Moroccan government over the use of a historical "prince's wagon" passenger car and from the Swiss embassy in Morocco over the train's viability. Kunz ended up committing five million euros to the project. The first trip was made in 2006, and the train ran twice annually in years like 2013 and 2017.

Outside camera shots of the Oriental Desert Express were featured in the 2015 James Bond film Spectre.

== Journey ==
As of 2024, the total travel time of the Oriental Desert Express can take between ten and twelve hours.

From accounts in 2012 and 2016, the express began in Oujda in the early morning with an EMD GT26CW-2 locomotive, known locally as a DH-370, and a consist of cars that include both air conditioning and open windows. Traversing the Hautes Plaines, the train would make a stop at the small town of Tendrara, Tagmoḍant. While the train generally traveled at a speed of about 50 kilometers per hour (31 mph), travel time between Tendrara and Bouarfa could vary greatly due to unplanned stops to clear sand from the railroad track, for which the train carried diagonal shovels, and meeting nomadic tribes. One such meeting was related by Neue Zürcher Zeitung:

... again the train stops. There are sheep outside and tents. We have arrived at nomads. The family leader invites us to tea in his tent. The women look at us curiously. But soon a conversation begins with hands and much laughter. The family belongs to the tribe of the Arabic-speaking Beni Guil, who have lived as nomads for over a thousand years.
