= Joseph Bouhsira =

Early Moroccan photographer

- יוסף אבוחצירא
- Born: 1890
- Died: 1943 (aged 52–53)

Joseph Bouhsira (1890–1943) was one of the early Moroccan photographers. He became the first Moroccan to own a photography studio when he opened his first studio in Fes in 1918.

== Biography ==
Joseph Bouhsira was one of a group of Jewish Moroccan pioneers of photography in Morocco at a time when a number of Moroccan Jews were acting as cultural intermediaries between Europeans and Muslim Moroccans. He acquired an introductory knowledge of relevant development techniques and chemistry processes from a French pharmacist in Fes and began his activities in photography in the early 1910s. Bouhsira became the first Moroccan to own a photography studio when he opened his first studio in the Derb el-Horra of the Mellah of Fes in 1918, after years of work in professional photography.

In 1911, he photographed France's military campaigns in the south of Morocco, a region to which he had family ties. At this time, he established a second studio in Boudenib. He found success and established more agencies in Wazzan (1937–1957) and Qsar as-Souq (now Errachidia; 1928–1975). In 1925, he moved his business in Fes from Derb el-Horra to rue Bou-Khsissat near the Mellah, and then again to a business called Etablissements A B C on Avenue Poeymireau (now Avenue Mohammad V) where it stayed until 1986.

His studios remained open after his death in 1943, with his progeny running the family business. His son Meyer took over the business in Fes and introduced color photography to Morocco in 1956. Joseph Bouhsira had trained many members of his family, including his brothers, his son (a professor of photography in Canada as of 2017), and his two cousins who opened a studio in Jerusalem.

According to Patricia Goldsworthy, while many European photographers depended on props and models for the “scene and type” photography genre, Moroccan Jewish photographers, including Bouhsira, tended to focus mostly on architecture, events, and activities of the Moroccan Jewish community.

He died prematurely in 1943, leaving several albums on the Jewish community of Fes.

== Photography ==
The photography done by Bouhsira contrasted with images made with the imperial gaze of European colonial photographers. In the analysis of Patricia Goldsworthy:

Many of Bouhsira’s images contain this same emphasis on the group rather than the individual. Most analyses of colonial photography argue that photography produced during this era favors a nameless, generic individual who supposedly represents the whole of a diverse group of peoples. Bouhsira’s images are also much more personalized than earlier photographs, which he achieves by listing the specific métier of the vender in the mellah, as opposed to simply labeling his images with generic terms such as “Jew from Morocco.” Whereas many French colonial photographers emphasized such “types,” including French photographers Cousin and M. Gueugnon, whose captions are no more descriptive than “Type of Moroccan Jewish Woman,” Bouhsira individualized the action captured in his photographs. Bouhsira also focused on aspects of life important to the Jewish community, such as life within the mellah, schools, and synagogues. The inclusion of Moroccan photographers into the existing canon of photographers demonstrates the diversity of photography in this era. In addition, Bouhsira’s photographs of the streets of the mellah convey a sense of motion that does not correspond to an analysis of colonial photography which only accounts for images depicting Morocco as stagnant.
