= Aoufous Formation =

Geological formation in Errachidia Province, Morocco

- Stratigraphic range: Early Cenomanian; ~99–97 Ma
- Type: Geological formation
- Unit of: Kem Kem Group
- Underlies: Ifezouane Formation
- Overlies: Akrabou Formation
- Thickness: 100–200 m (330–660 ft)

Lithology
- Primary: Sandstone, claystone, limestone
- Other: Marl, gypsum

Location
- Coordinates: 31.8°N 5.9°W
- Approximate paleocoordinates: 19.3°N 5.3°W
- Region: Errachidia Province
- Country: Morocco
- Extent: Anti-Atlas-Sahara craton

Type section
- Named for: Aoufous
- Named by: Dubar
- Year defined: 1948
- Aoufous Formation (Morocco)

The Aoufous Formation is a geological formation that contains some of the vertebrate assemblage of the Kem Kem Group, of Late Cretaceous date. It underlies the Ifezouane Formation and overlies the Akrabou Formation.

== Description ==
The Aoufous Formation was first reported by Dubar (1948) as part of the “Sillon Preafricain”. Dubar described it from a lithological point of view as consisting mainly of clay-sandstones and green marls with gypsum. Dubar dated the sediments to the Albian / Cenomanian stages. Later, Sereno et al. (1996) reported an informal division of the Kem Kem Beds: a lower red sandstone unit ("gres infrecenomanien") and an upper marley unit ("marne versicolores a gypse"). Because of the absence of hiatuses between and within the three formations, the represented time scale is of around 8 million years, covering the time from the Early Cenomanian to the Middle Turonian. The Aoufous Formation is exposed from the Anti-Atlas and High Atlas mountain ranges up to the Sahara craton, in the southeastern part of Morocco. The formation is 100 to 200 metres (330 to 660 ft) thick.

=== Geological history ===
In the early Mesozoic Era, the main displacement of the African continent was from south to north, in the direction of Europe. The Atlantic Ocean was opening with high rates of expansion. This caused the uplift of the western part of Morocco, causing exposure of Precambrian and Paleozoic rocks, and prevented a continuous deposition of Mesozoic sediments in western Morocco. In the Jurassic, most of modern Morocco had already emerged. The first marine transgression is dated to the Early Barremian. During the Barremian-Aptian, two elongated marine gulfs extended northwards along the Middle-Atlas and from the western Essaouira Basin. In the Early Cretaceous, Northern Africa was covered with deltaic and brackish environments. These deposits comprise the Kem Kem Beds and thus the Aoufous Formation too.

=== Age ===
The Aoufous Formation shows a similar fauna to that one found in the Bahariya Formation of Egypt. In both these formations, Spinosaurus aegyptiacus is found. In addition, several species of crocodilians and fishes are shared. The Bahariya Formation is well dated to the Early Cenomanian. The rare microfossils found in the Aoufous Formation were not helpful in dating these sediments. For these reasons, the age of the Aoufous Formation is considered early Cenomanian.

=== Facies ===
The Aoufous Formation is characterized by three facies: variegated claystones, gypsum layers and dolomitic limestones. Claystones contain organic matter. Vertebrate remains (mostly fishes) are found in these claystones. No calcitic shells are found there, but apatitic microfossils are present. Quartz and marcasite (typical of a reducing environment) are quite frequent.

In carbonaceous facies, vertebrate fossils are present. The dolomitisation of these sediments destroyed any organic presence in them. Gastropods, thin-shelled and thick-shelled ostracods and some rare agglutinated foraminifers are present in this facies. Quartz is present with different morphologies, suggesting eolian (wind-based) and fluvial (river-based) transport.

In the gypsum layers, fossils are absent. These layers testify to long periods of dryness connected to evaporation of salty waters. The facies and the fossil remains suggest a paleoenvironment as a coastal lagoon or a paralic sebkha.

==== OT1 ====
OT1 is a locality (10 kilometres (6.2 mi) away from Tafraout) characterized by lenses of claystone. Several fossil articulated fishes, gastropods and crustaceans specimens were recovered from this locality. The stratigraphic position of these lenses of claystone lies within the Aoufous Formation. Several features differentiate this facies from the others that are commonly encountered in the Aoufous Formation, and, for this reason, they are usually described apart.

The fauna of these lenses is characterized from three cladistians (Serenoichthys kemkemensis and two other unnamed genera), an indeterminate actinopterygian, and the oldest known freshwater acanthomorph (Spinocaudichthys oumtkoutensis). The paleoenvironment of OT1 has been interpreted as a quiet lake, where the process of fossilization was quite rapid (soft tissues are generally preserved).

=== Vertebrate assemblage ===
Because fossils from the formation are usually retrieved by local people who are untrained as geologists, it is difficult to know the exact provenance of many of them. For this reason, the provenance of a fossil from the Ifezouane and the Aoufous Formations is not generally specified; in any case the two formations seem to present the same fauna.

The most common vertebrate remains belong to the elasmobranch fish Onchopristis numidus. Another seven elasmobranchs are reported: Asteracanthus aegyptiacus, Distobatus nutiae, Tribodus sp., Lissodus sp., Haimirichia amonensis, Cretoxyrhinidae indet., and Marckgrafia lybica. Lungfish fossils are referred to Ceratodus humei and Neoceratodus africanus. Coelacanth remains are referred to Mawsonia lavocati and to the genus Axelrodichthys. Several taxa of Cladistia and two genera of seminiomorphs (an unnamed Lepidotes-like species and Oniichthys falipoui) are recovered in the Kem Kem beds. Teleosteans are represented by Cladocyclus pankowskii, Palaeonotopterus greenwoodi, Erfoudichthys rosae and Concavotectum moroccensis. Amphibians are also present: Kababisha sp., the pipid frog Oumtkoutia anae and non-pipids frogs. Turtles are represented by several species: Dirqadim schaefferi, the podocnemidids Hamadachelys escuilliei, the bothremydids Galianemys whitei and G. emringeri, and the araripemydids Araripemys sp. Crocodilians are commonly found; four species are present: Elosuchus cherifiensis, a genus belonged to the Trematochampsidae, Araripesuchus rattoides and Laganosuchus maghrebensis.

In regards to dinosaurs, a rebbachisaurid (Rebbachisaurus garasbae) and some ornithischian footprints were recovered in the Kem Kem Beds; the most important presence belongs to theropods. Among theropods, two carcharodontosaurids (Carcharodontosaurus saharicus and Sauroniops pachytholus), one spinosaurid (Spinosaurus aegyptiacus), two ceratosaurs (Deltadromeus agilis and an unnamed abelisaur) and an unnamed dromaeosaur characterize the assemblage.

Pterosaurs are also present, although their fossils are extremely rare and enigmatic: an azhdarchid, an ornithocheirid, a tapejarid and a pteranodontid are recognized.

== See also ==
- Geology of Morocco
- Wadi Milk Formation
