= Morocco commemorative medal (1909) =

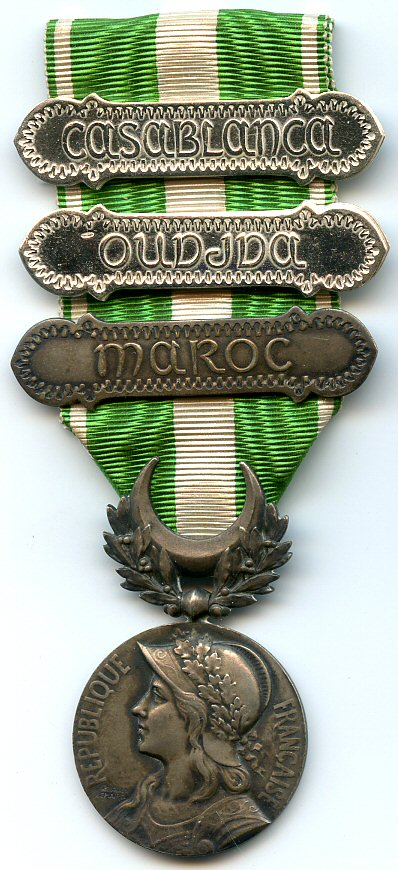
- Medal with three clasps
- Type: Campaign Medal
- Presented by: France
- Campaign: Second Franco-Moroccan War
- First award: 22 July 1909
- Final award: 20 July 1912

Highlights
- Total: ~63,200
- Ribbon of the Morocco commemorative medal (1909)

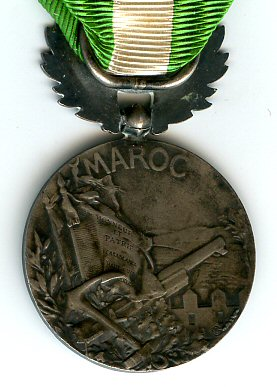
Reverse of the Morocco commemorative medal (1909)

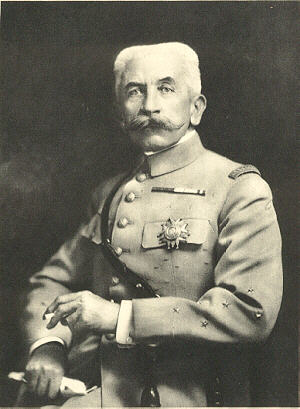
Marshal of France Hubert Lyautey, a recipient of the Morocco commemorative medal (1909)

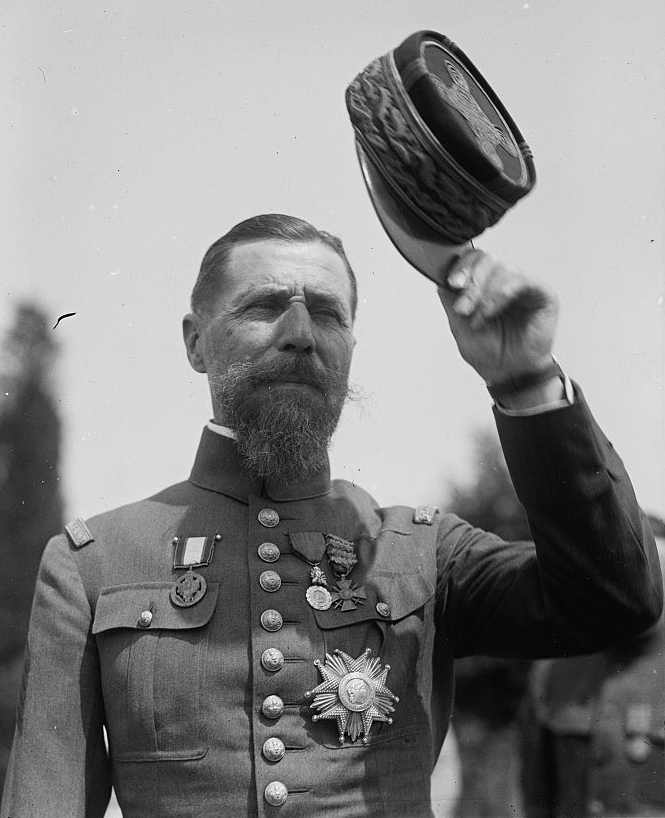
General Henri Gouraud, a recipient of the Morocco commemorative medal (1909)

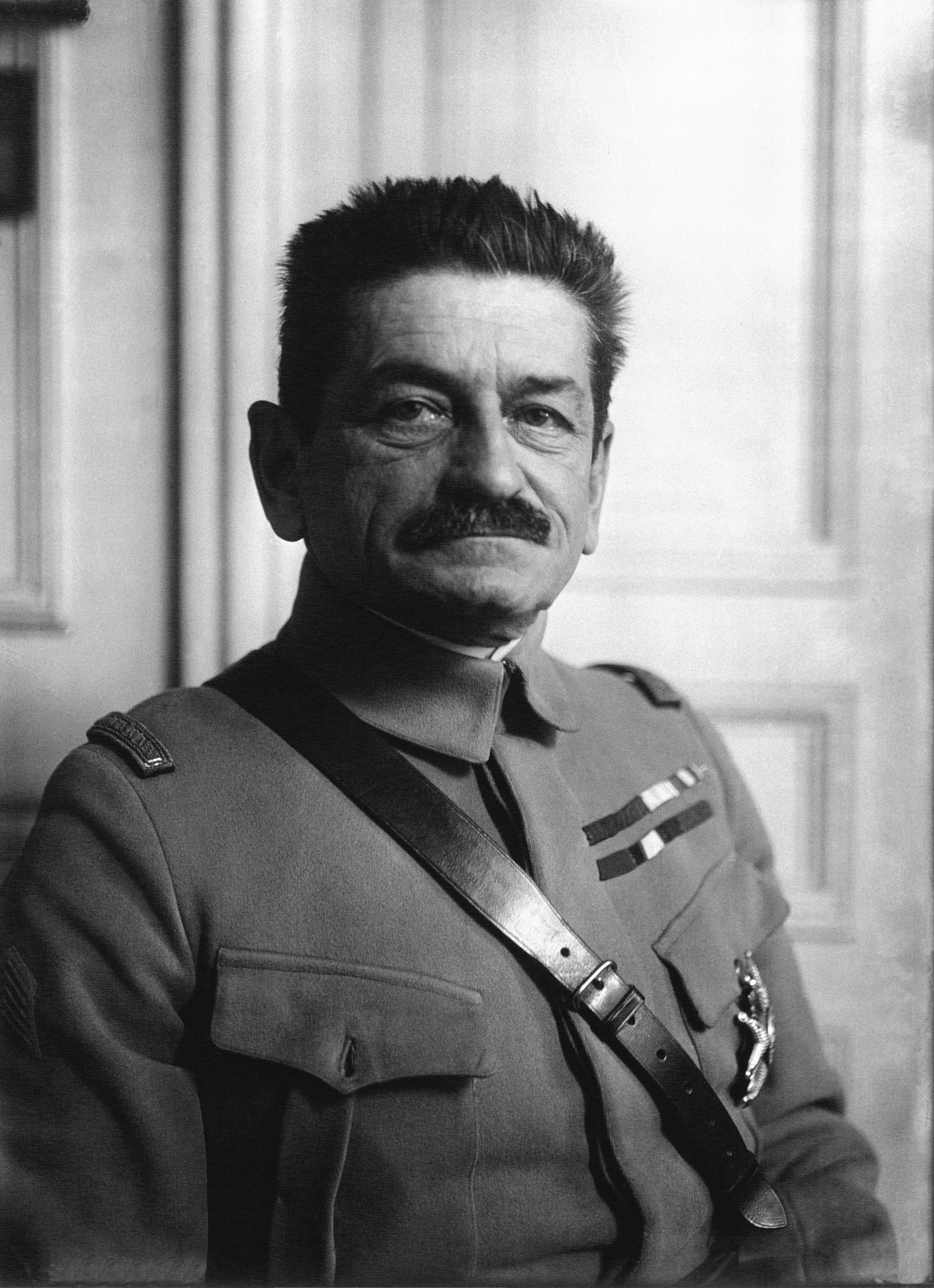
General Charles Mangin, a recipient of the Morocco commemorative medal (1909)

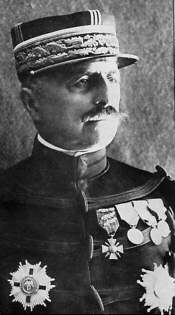
Marshal of France Louis Franchet d'Espèrey, a recipient of the Morocco commemorative medal (1909)

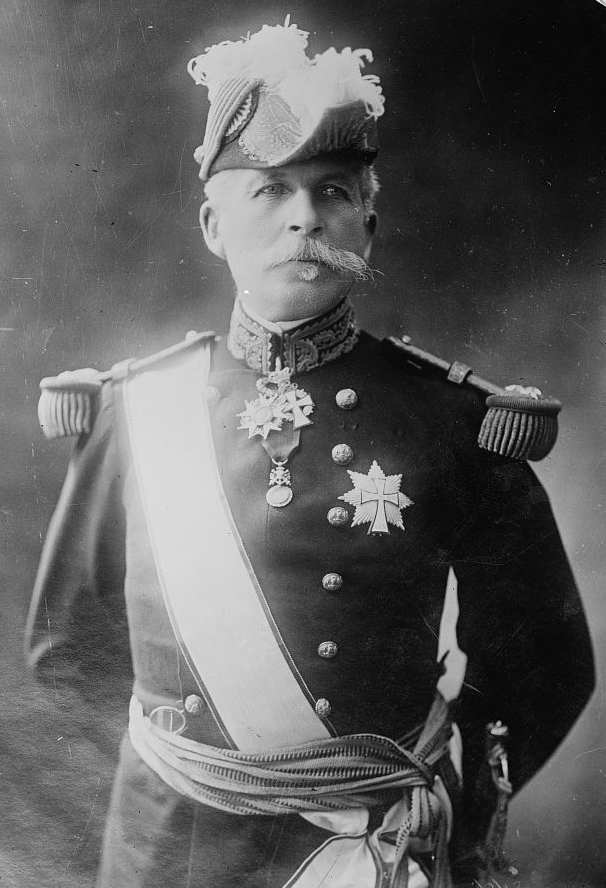
General Albert d'Amade, a recipient of the Morocco commemorative medal (1909)

The Morocco commemorative medal (1909) (French: "Médaille commémorative du Maroc (1909)") was a French military campaign medal. It was established by the law of 22 July 1909 for award to soldiers participating in the Second Franco-Moroccan War under the command of general (and future Marshal of France) Hubert Lyautey.

Bars were added to the ribbon of the medal to indicate the locations of military operations during France's occupation of Morocco, and Moroccan bars were also added to the French colonial medal.

Long time French colonial interests in North Africa led to tensions between European nations but particularly disturbed Germany. Early in the new century, France pushed established international agreements to their limits bringing tensions to a high point in the Agadir Crisis.

In 1907, France responded to the assassination of Émile Mauchamp with a military invasion of Oujda, and to an uprising in protest of the terms of the Treaty of Algeciras with a naval bombardment of Casablanca and a military invasion of the Chaouia plain.

This led to leading to an escalation in the number of French troops in their country under the auspices of so-called pacification operations. These military operations went on until 30 March 1912, the date of the signature of the Treaty of Fes, which made Morocco a French Protectorate.

== Award statute ==
In accordance with article 1 of the law of 22 July 1909, the Morocco commemorative medal (1909) was awarded to:

- 1° any soldier who sailed for Casablanca between 5 August 1907 and 15 June 1909;
- 2° any soldier who served in occupation troops on the right bank of Oujda or in the French mission in that city at any time between 29 March 1907 and 1 January 1909;
- 3° any soldier who crossed the Naour-Turenne-Sidi Aïssa line, including the cities themselves, between 23 November 1907 and 10 January 1908;
- 4° any soldier who marched with the columns that operated from 6 March 1908 to 10 June 1908 or from 15 August 1908 to 7 October 1908, South of the Teniet el Sassi parallel, to the West of a line that, starting from Teniet el Sassi, would join at Duveyrier the Northern limits of the Saharan regions to the East of Forthassa Gharbia;
- 5° any soldier who was part at any given time between 6 March 1908 and 15 June 1909, of the Boudenib or Bouanane garrisons, or of the detachments charged with the resupply of these posts, or of the organization and movements of these supplies, or of the construction of the telegraph line from Colomba to Boudenib;
- 6° Goumiers who served in the aforementioned regions during the same time periods;
- 7° any member of the personnel of the Navy Department who, from 5 August 1907 to 15 June 1909, served at any given moment in Morocco, or served on board a vessel of the naval forces detached to Morocco or charged with a mission in Moroccan waters;
- 8° functionaries and civil servants of the various ministerial departments and personnel of French relief and medical societies for wounded soldiers who served in the aforementioned regions of paragraphs 1 through 5 at the aforementioned dates, and to Frenchmen who, as civilians, took part in the defence of the French consulate in Casablanca between 5 and 7 August 1907, or who contributed to the defence of the Bab-el-Hossa plant on the day of 27 November of the same year.

Article 2 of the law of 22 July 1909 further stated that clasps would be worn on the ribbon. The clasps were earned as follows:

- Personnel referred to in paragraphs 1° and 7° would wear the "CASABLANCA" clasp;
- Personnel referred to in paragraphs 2° and 3° would wear the "OUDJDA" clasp;
- Personnel referred to in paragraphs 4° and 5° would wear the "HAUT-GUIR" clasp;
- Personnel referred to in paragraphs 6° and 8° would wear the clasp depending on the region where the service occurred giving the right to wear the medal.

In accordance with Article 1° of the decree of 4 June 1913, the Morocco commemorative medal (1909) was awarded with the "MAROC" clasp to:

- any soldier, Moroccan Goumier or moghazeni (indigenous civil servant), who served in the occupation forces between 29 September 1911 and 19 July 1912;
- the instructors of the military mission, of the chérifienne (Arab) army or of the auxiliary Moroccan troops who served in Morocco during the aforementioned period;
- the instructors of the Franco-Moroccan port authority police and of the company of Franco-Moroccan border police who served in regions occupied by French military forces during the aforementioned period;
- the indigenous Moroccans who served in the chérifienne (Arab) army service corps, of auxiliary Moroccan troops, of the Moroccan port authority police or of the company of Franco-Moroccan border police, who cooperated to the operations in Morocco between 29 September 1911 and 19 July 1912, who were wounded or particularly distinguished themselves;
- the indigenous Algerian, Tunisian or Moroccan handlers who participated for a minimum of two months to the operations in Morocco between 29 September 1911 and 19 July 1912, who were wounded or particularly distinguished themselves, and to those who signed up for a further contract after six months of service;
- all naval personnel that sailed between 29 September 1911 and 19 July 1912, on a vessel of the Moroccan naval division based or that sailed South of the port of Mehdya, and to all naval personnel who served between the aforementioned dates, towards the ports of Rabat and Casablanca;
- functionaries and civil servants of the various ministerial departments who, in view of their functions, took part in military operations, and to the personnel of relief and medical societies for wounded soldiers, accredited by the War Department, who served in the aforementioned regions at the aforementioned dates.
- the chiefs, agents or indigenous individuals who, having clearly identified themselves to the French cause by their devotion, were wounded or particularly distinguished themselves during the operations of the same time periods;

Article 2° of the same decree stated that actions or service after the law of 22 July 1912 were not be considered for award of the Morocco commemorative medal (1909), instead, these later operations, such as in 1915 and then from 1925 to 1926 to put down the tribal revolt in the Rif mountains directed by the nationalist leader Adb el-Krim, were instead awarded the Colonial Medal (French: "Médaille coloniale"), with campaign clasps for "Maroc 1915" or "Maroc 1925–1926".

== Award description ==
The Morocco commemorative medal (1909) was a 30mm in diameter circular silver medal. The obverse bore the relief image of the effigy of the "warrior republic" in the form of the left profile of a helmeted woman's bust, the helmet being adorned by a crown of oak leaves. On either side, the relief inscription along the circumference "RÉPUBLIQUE FRANÇAISE" (English: "FRENCH REPUBLIC"). The reverse, representing both the army and navy, bears the relief images of an infantry rifle crossed with a naval anchor below two military banners and lances surmounted by the relief inscription "MAROC" (English: "MOROCCO"), the banners bore the inscriptions "HONNEUR ET PATRIE" (English: "HONOUR AND COUNTRY") and the words "CASABLANCA", "HAUT-GUIR", and "OUDJDA". In the background, sand dunes, the wall of a Kasbah and palm trees.

The medal hung from a 36mm wide silk moiré green ribbon with a 7mm white central stripe and two 2mm wide white stripes 1mm from the ribbon edges. The medal suspension ring was adorned by a silver laurel wreath and a crescent.

Four silver clasps of oriental design could be worn on the ribbon:

- CASABLANCA
- OUDJDA
- HAUT-GUIR
- MAROC

== Noteworthy recipients ==
- Marshal of France Hubert Lyautey
- General Henri Gouraud
- General Charles Mangin
- General Maurice Eugène François Baumgarten
- Marshal of France Alphonse Juin
- General Robert Nivelle
- General Jean-Marie Brulard
- General Albert d'Amade
- General Paul-Frédéric Rollet
- General Jacques-Théodore Saconney
- Marshal of France Louis Franchet d'Espèrey
- Admiral Jean de Laborde
- Surgeon general Adolphe Sicé
- General Joseph Émile Mangin
- Lieutenant Adolphe Pégoud

== See also ==
- Army of Africa (France)
- Agadir Crisis
- French conquest of Morocco
- French protectorate in Morocco
- French colonial empire
- Spanish protectorate in Morocco
- History of Morocco
- Abd al-Hafid of Morocco
