= Mount Amchad =

Mountain in Morocco

- Location within Morocco

Highest point
- Elevation: 1,238 m (4,062 ft)
- Coordinates: 31°17′N 4°59′W

Geography
- Location: Errachidia Province, Morocco
- Parent range: Anti-Atlas

Climbing
- First ascent: Unknown

Mount Amchad is a mountain in Errachidia Province, Morocco. It is located in the Atlas Mountains near the village of Asemmam.
