= Arthur Pereyre =

Isaac Arthur Pereyre (1863–1934) was a Jewish activist in Bayonne (in Southern France), and a commandant in the French army. Although his Hebrew name was יצחק (Isaac), he was known as "Arthur" in the secular world. He was married to Marguerite (Rebecca - רבקה) Pereyre, née Léon (1873 – 1968).

The main accomplishment for which Pereyre is remembered by history is his writing out phonetically, according to modern French phonetics, the transliteration of the Mahzor (holiday prayerbook) of the Jewish community of Bayonne and Bordeaux. He wrote out this transliteration for the benefit of his wife, in the early years of the twentieth century.

The Jewish communities of Bayonne and Bordeaux were founded by ex-conversos, Sephardi Jews who had pretended to convert to Catholicism, yet secretly continued keeping their Jewish traditions. The communities had a special way of pronouncing Hebrew, which retained numerous archaic features lost elsewhere. Although the synagogues still exist today, they have been taken over by North African Jews. The old ex-converso community has now dwindled to a few individuals. Thus, Pereyre's transliteration is invaluable in teaching linguists how the Hebrew pronunciation of the old community sounded. Prof. Moshe Bar-Asher transcribed and published Pereyre's transliterated Mahzor along with a study of the pronunciation as reflected in it.

Arthur Pereyre is also credited for having copied a manuscript containing a Spanish translation of some haftarot, where the masoretic accents (the teamim) are written on the Spanish text itself, indicating to the reader the way to read and to chant it. This manuscript, discovered in 2014 by Peter Nahon, is believed to be the only non-Hebrew text bearing a punctuation system close to that of the Hebrew Bible.

== Sources ==
- Bar-Asher, Moshe. העברית שבפי צאצי האנוסים בצרפת. Mosad Bialik, 2006.
- Nahon, Peter. "Un manuscrit espagnol ponctué de ṭe'amim bibliques: Un autre cahier de Pereyre?", in: Revue des études juives 174/3-4 (2015), 399–410. External link.
