= El Khorbat Oujdid =

Fortified village in Tinejdad, Morocco

Coordinates: 31.4935°N 5.0853°W

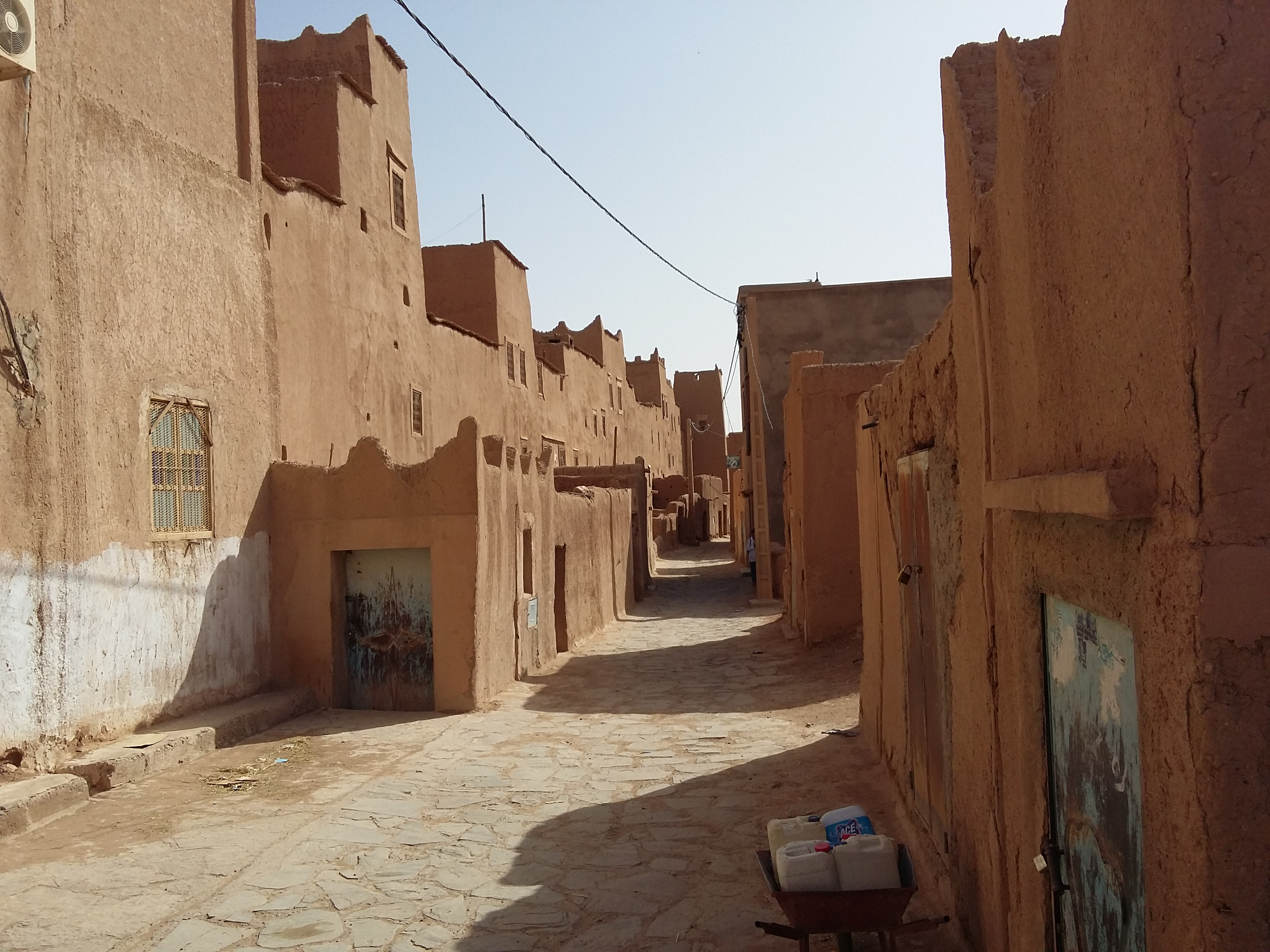
The wall on the left is the outer wall of the ksar

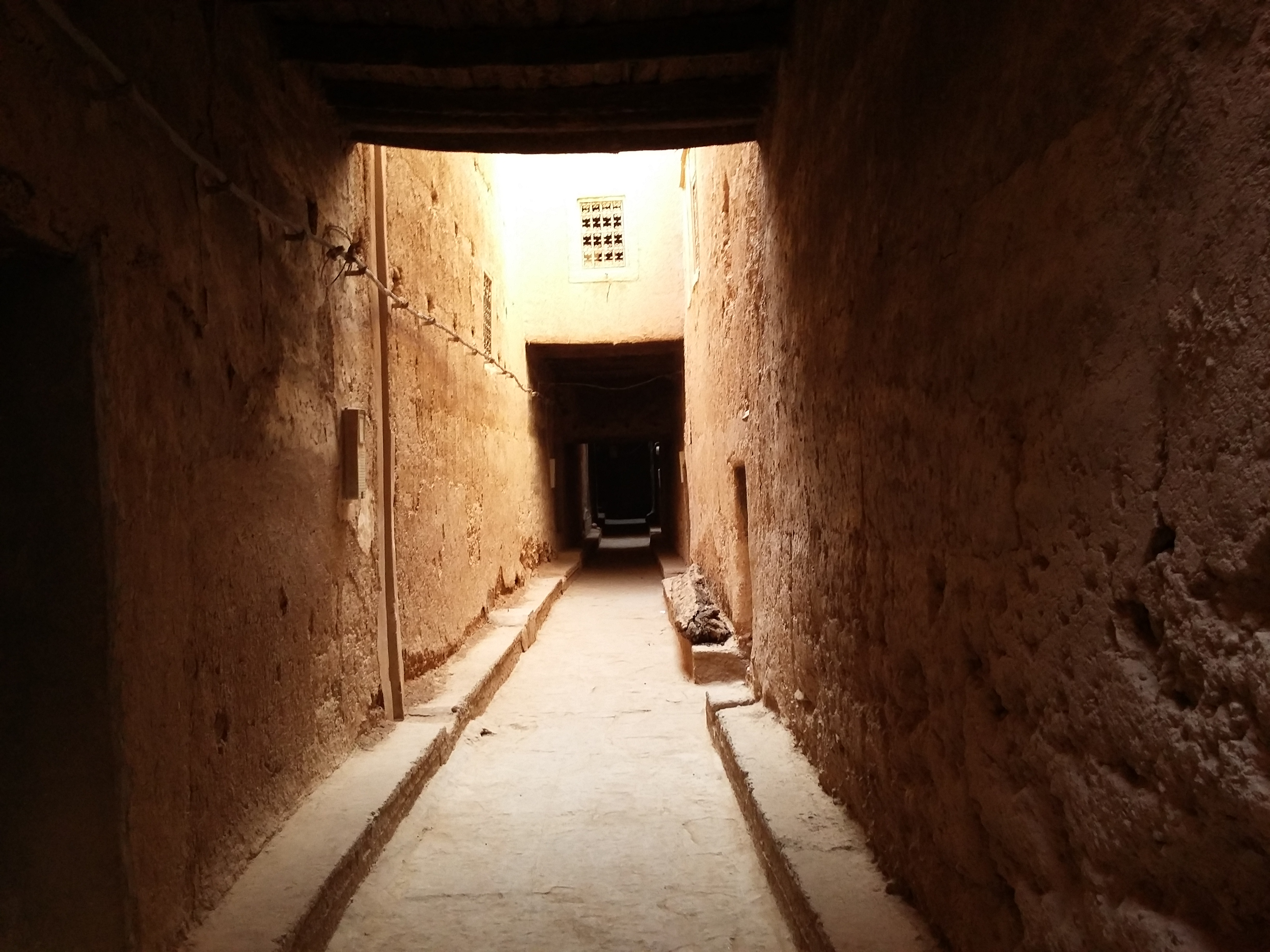
Alley in the ksar

El Khorbat Oujdid is a ksar (a fortified village) near the Moroccan town of Tinejdad (about 50 km from Tinghir). This ksar was built in 1860 and is still inhabited.

The ksar was completely built with rammed earth, it is walled and has a number of towers. The complex has a main alley and a number of sideways which results in a more or less straight street pattern. The house were built over the alleys so the alleys are cool.

Since November 2002, the complex has a small museum, The Oasis Museum, and since 2004 a number of restored houses are used as hotel rooms. Furthermore, the ksar has a school and a mosque.
