= Medfouna =

Moroccan stuffed dough dish

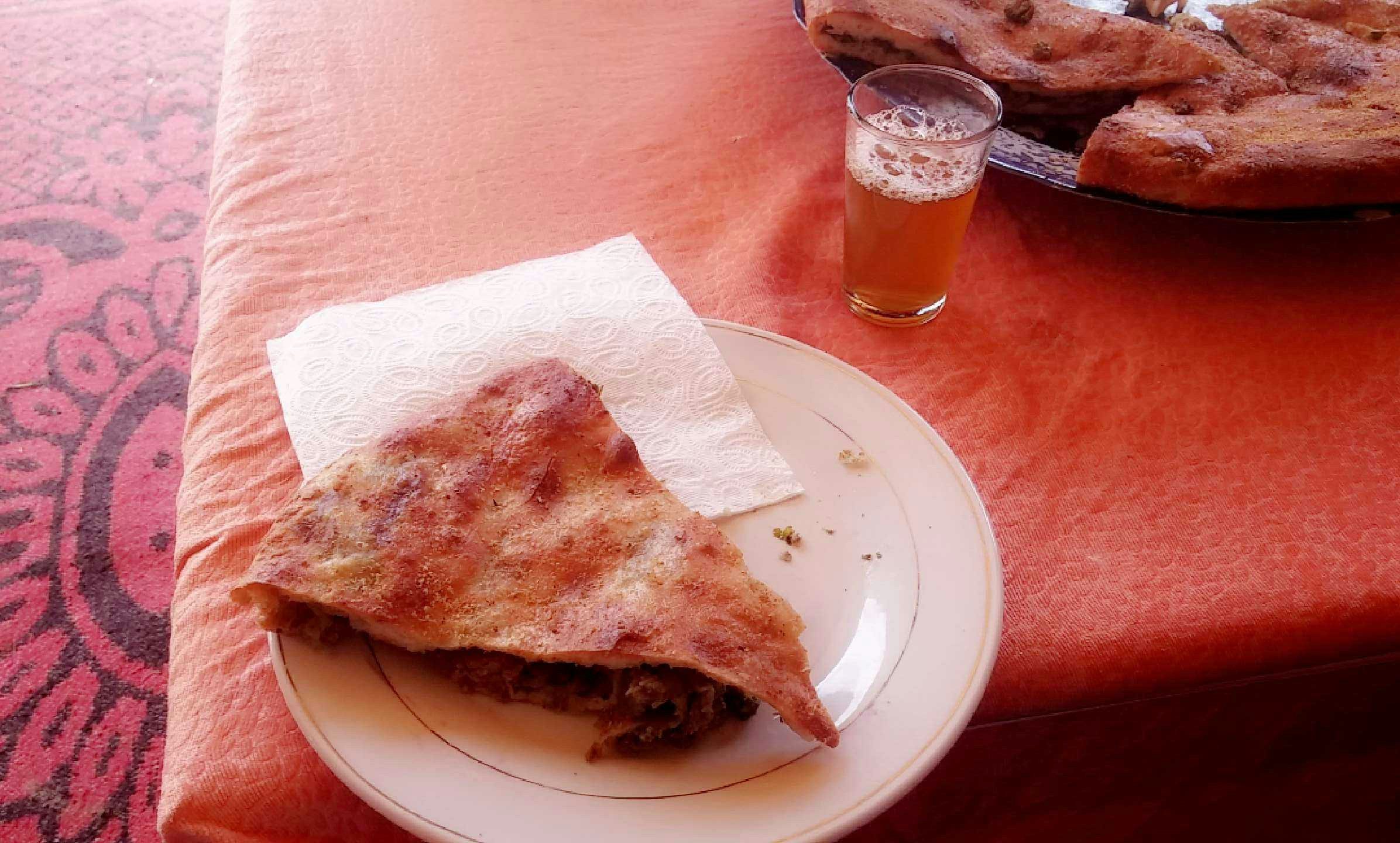
- Medfouna or Berber pizza at a local restaurant near Merzouga, Errachidia Province
- Alternative names: Rissani, Berber pizza
- Course: Main course
- Region or state: Drâa-Tafilalet, Morocco
- Associated cuisine: Berber cuisine, Moroccan cuisine
- Serving temperature: Hot

Medfouna (Arabic: المدفونة, "buried"; Standard Moroccan Tamazight: abadir), also known as "Berber pizza" or "desert pizza", is a Berber and Moroccan cuisine, rustic dish from the Middle Atlas of Morocco. It is prepared from a round-shaped dough that is stuffed and baked over a wood fire, soft inside and crispy outside. Unlike pizza, Medfouna consists of two layers of dough: one at the bottom and one on top that covers the filling. It is typically served along with a glass of Moroccan mint tea.

== Etymology ==
In the Drâa-Tafilalet region, medfouna is also known as Rissani, named after the town of Rissani, known for its specialty medfouna.

== History ==
Medfouna is inherited from the Berbers of the oases in the southern region of Morocco. This dish is a symbol of the cultural and culinary traditions of this part of Morocco.

== Popularity ==
The popularity of this dish has increased after British chef Gordon Ramsay, as part of filming his culinary series Uncharted, a travel cooking show organized in partnership with National Geographic channel, travelled to Morocco to discover different aspects of Moroccan gastronomy.

By visiting the Middle Atlas mountains, the British chef introduced viewers to the Medfouna recipe presented by the Berbers of the Middle Atlas. A rustic recipe, made from local products, consisting of various types of mushrooms that grow in the surrounding mountains, spices, and fresh Berber cheese from the region. According to the tradition of the Middle Atlas, Medfouna is cooked over a wood fire, unlike that of the Berbers of Tafilalet who cook it under the desert sand.

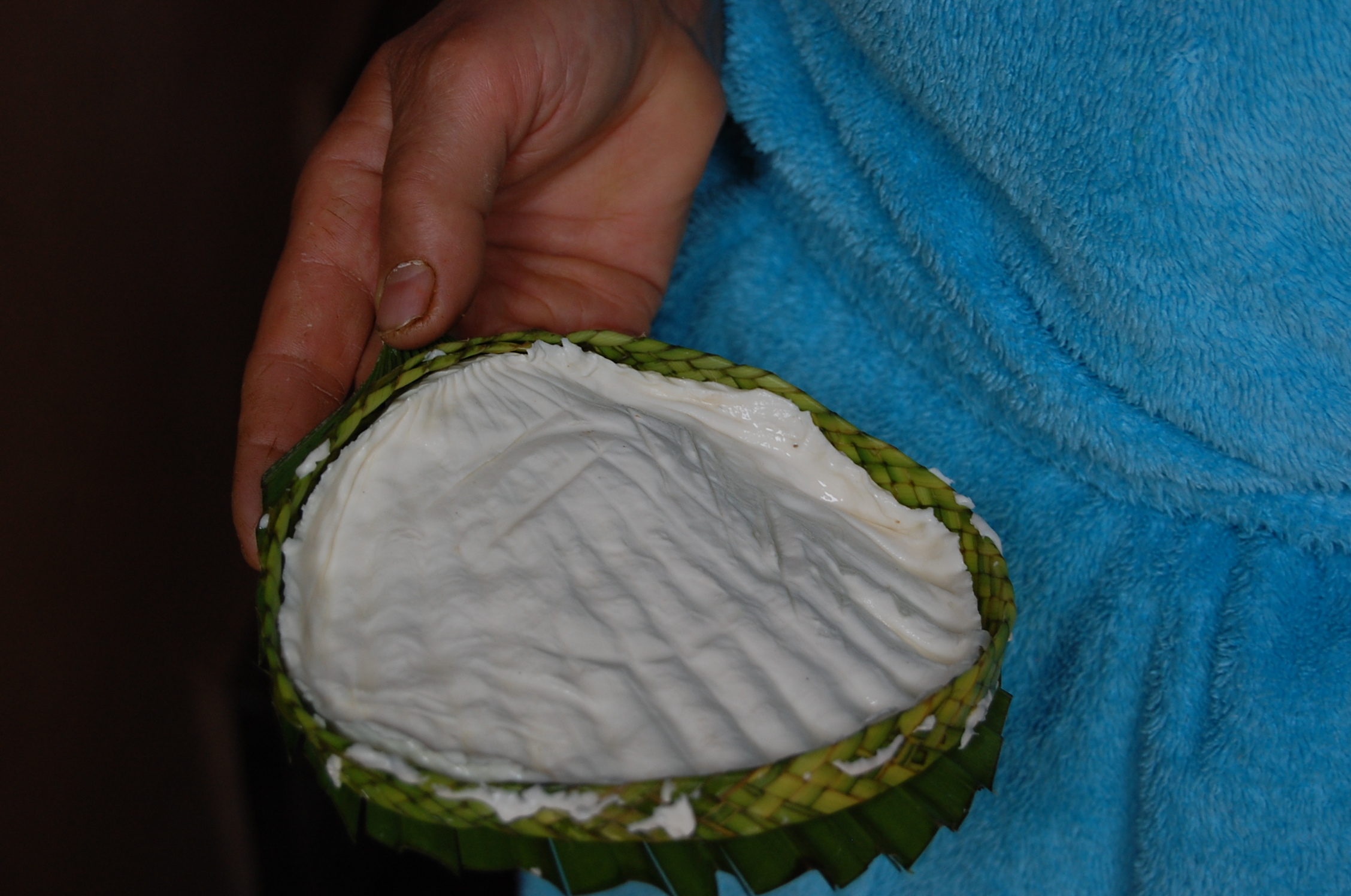
A variety of traditional Berber cheese from Morocco used in Medfouna stuffing

== Recipe ==
Preparation of medfouna, from heating stones to cooking and serving

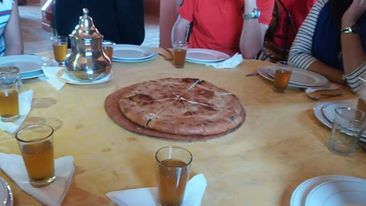
Traditional medfouna, accompanied by mint tea

The stuffing is a combination of spices and herbs, usually accompanied by portions of vegetables, onions, and minced meat (lamb, beef or goat), as well as cheese, coriander, and a little fat. The whole can be topped with slices of hard-boiled eggs.
