= Talsint =

Talsint تالسينت ⵜⴰⵍⵙⵉⵏⵜ
- Rural commune
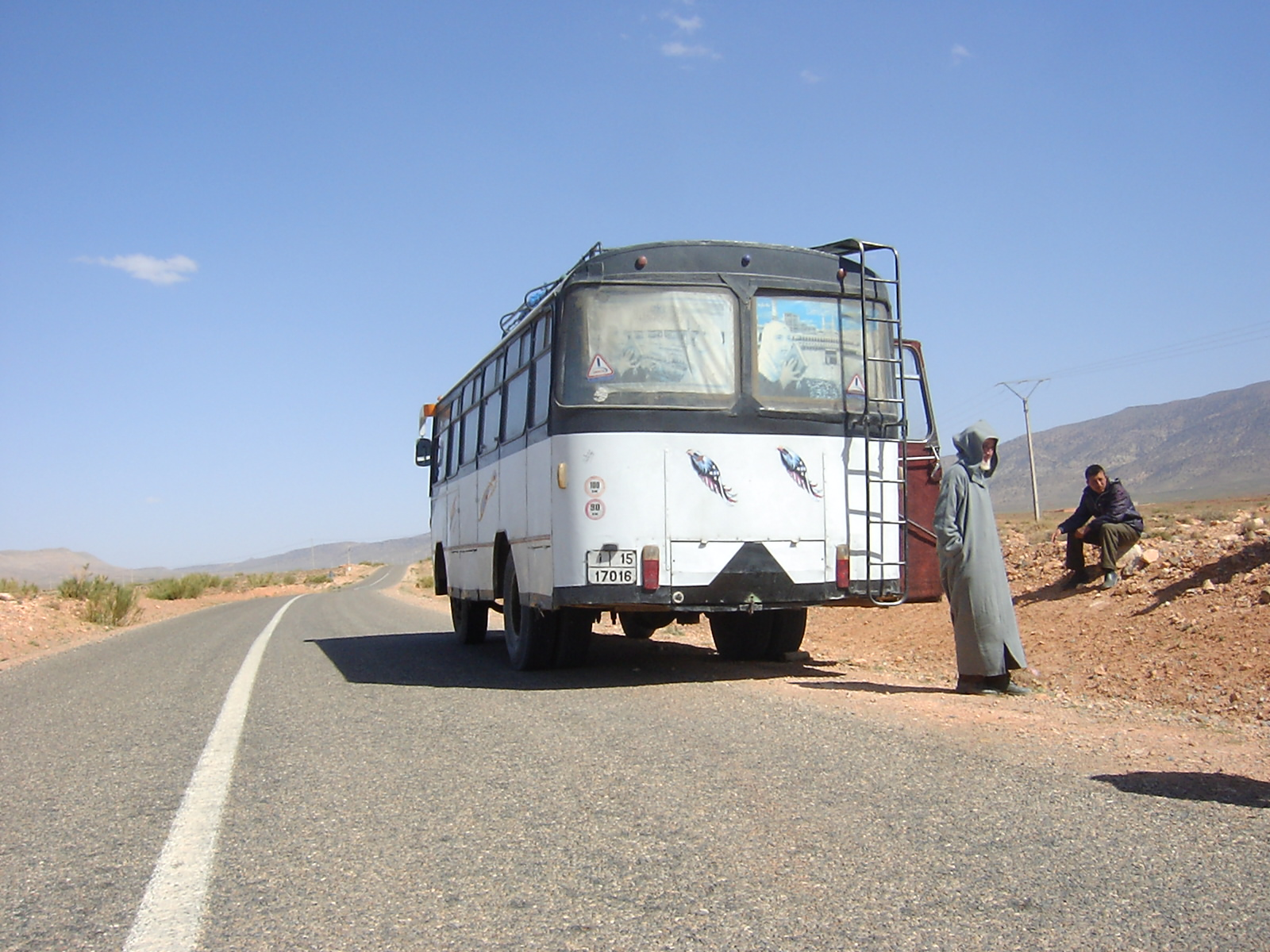
- LMAN-yallah, heading to Talsint
- Interactive map of Talsint
- Coordinates: 32.539847°N 3.440805°W
- Country: Morocco
- Region: Oriental
- Province: Figuig

Population (2014)
  - Rural commune: 16,166
  - Urban: 9,079
- Time zone: UTC+0 (GMT)

Talsint is a town and rural commune in Figuig Province, Oriental, Morocco. According to the 2004 census, it had a population of 7,098.

Talsint enjoyed huge media coverage in Morocco, when on 20 August 2000, King Mohammed VI announced the discovery of substantial quantities of oil and natural gas reserves in the region. Further research revealed this to be untrue.
