= Jorf =

Coordinates: 31°29′25″N 4°24′5″W

- Town
- Location in Morocco
- Country: Morocco
- Region: Drâa-Tafilalet
- Province: Errachidia

Population (2004)
  - Total: 12,135
- Time zone: UTC+0 (GMT)

Jorf is a city in Errachidia Province, Drâa-Tafilalet, Morocco. It is divided into several districts: El Mounkara, Jorf-Center, El Achouria, Oualad Ghanem, Oulad moussa, and Erramlia. According to the 2004 census it has a population of 12,135.
