= Aoufous =

- Town
- Interactive map of Aoufous
- Coordinates: 31°41′N 4°10′W
- Country: Morocco
- Region: Drâa-Tafilalet
- Province: Errachidia Province

Population (2004)
  - Total: 1,272
- Time zone: UTC+0 (GMT)

Aoufous is a town in Errachidia Province, Drâa-Tafilalet, Morocco. According to the 2004 census it has a population of 1272. It is located near the Aoufous Formation, which bears dinosaur fossils dating back to the Cenomanian, Late Cretaceous.
