= Bni Tadjite =

- Rural commune
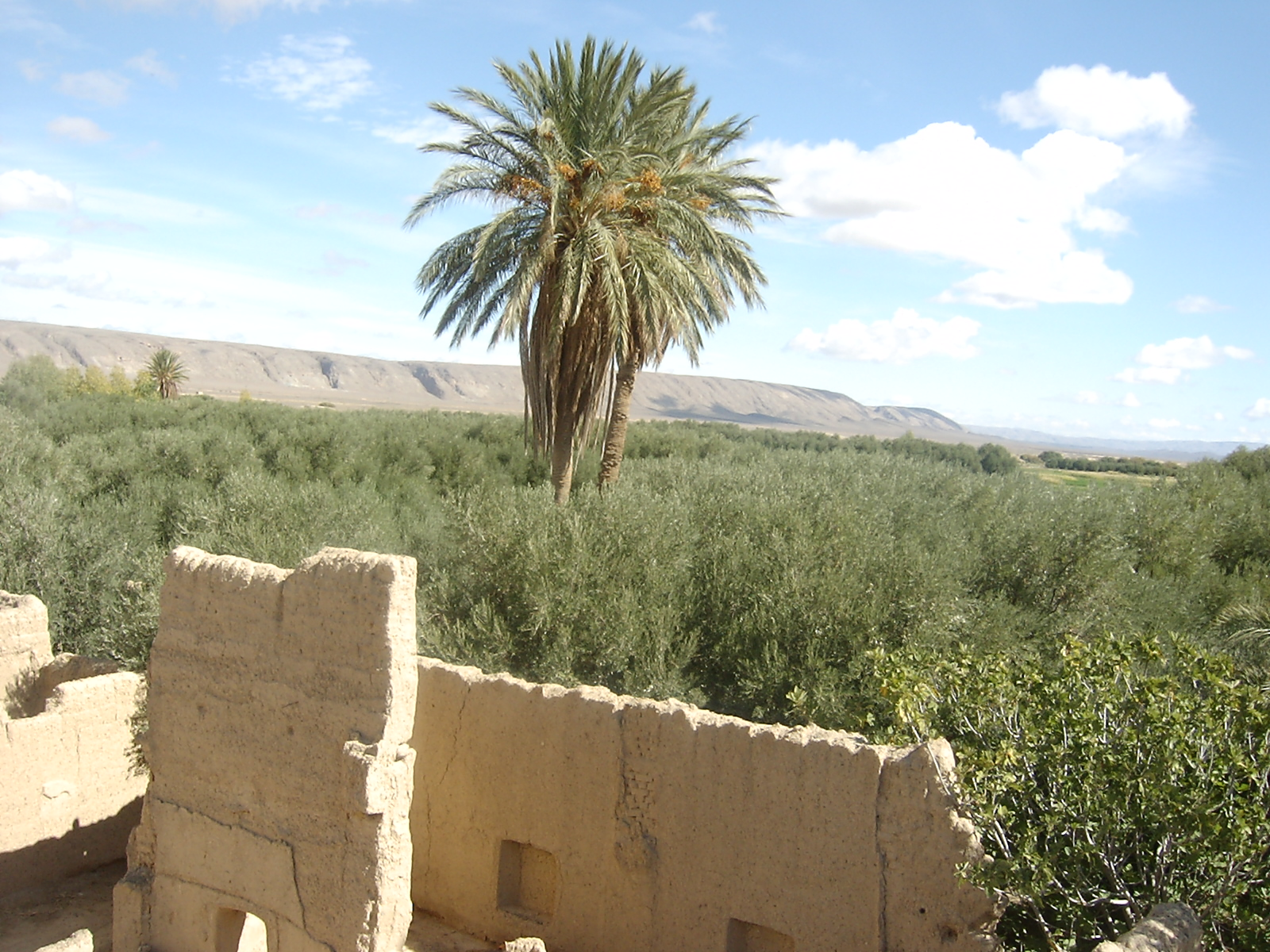
- Sidi Benmouh orchard
- Interactive map of Bni Tadjite
- Coordinates: 32.2833°N 3.48333°W
- Country: Morocco
- Region: Oriental
- Province: Figuig

Population (2014)
  - Rural commune: 16,149
  - Urban: 8,489
- Time zone: UTC+0 (GMT)

Bni Tadjite is a rural commune and town in Figuig Province, Oriental, Morocco. According to the 2014 census, the town had a population of 8,489.
