= Geology of Morocco =

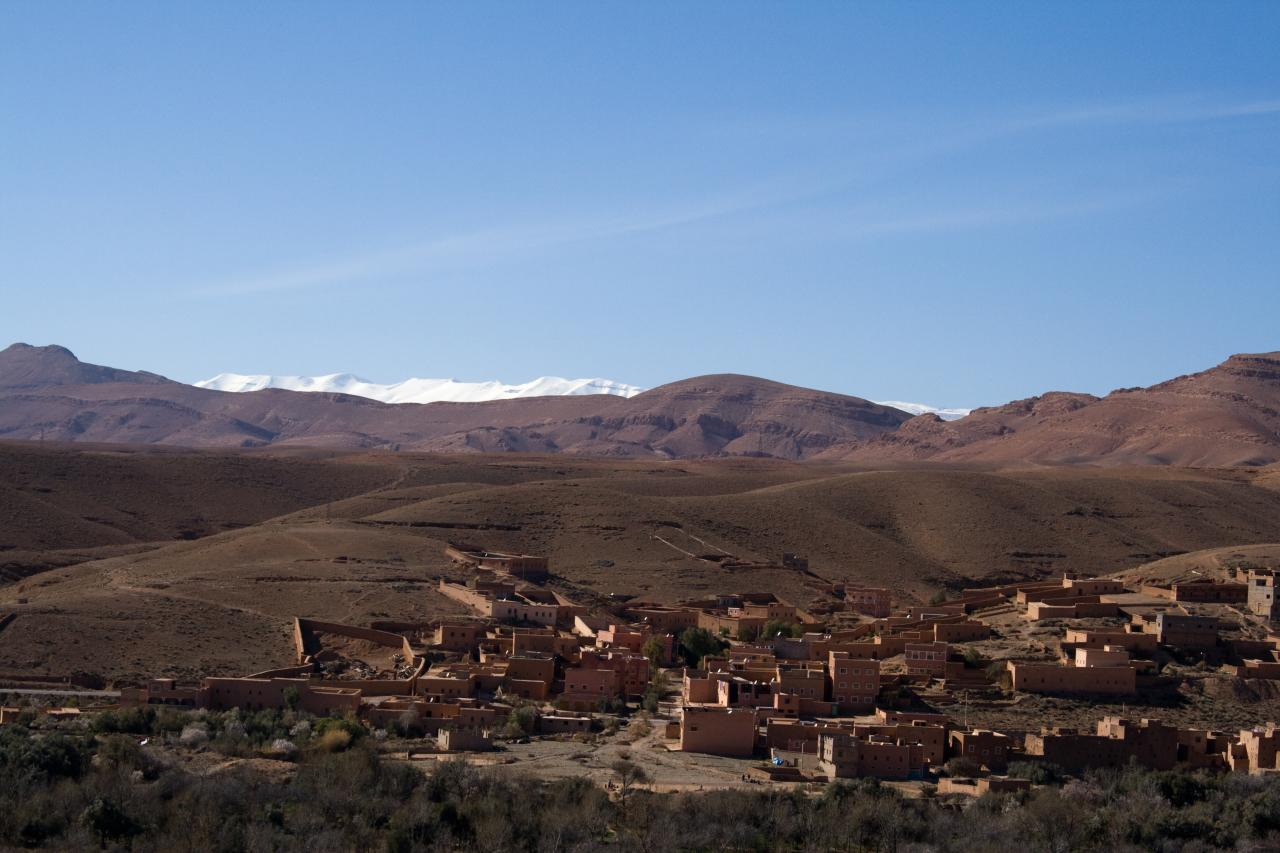
Geology of Morocco

The geology of Morocco formed beginning up to two billion years ago, in the Paleoproterozoic and potentially even earlier. It was affected by the Pan-African orogeny, although the later Hercynian orogeny produced fewer changes and left the Maseta Domain, a large area of remnant Paleozoic massifs. During the Paleozoic, extensive sedimentary deposits preserved marine fossils. Throughout the Mesozoic, the rifting apart of Pangaea to form the Atlantic Ocean created basins and fault blocks, which were blanketed in terrestrial and marine sediments—particularly as a major marine transgression flooded much of the region. In the Cenozoic, a microcontinent covered in sedimentary rocks from the Triassic and Cretaceous collided with northern Morocco, forming the Rif region. Morocco has extensive phosphate and salt reserves, as well as resources such as lead, zinc, copper and silver.

== Stratigraphy, tectonics and geologic history ==
The oldest rocks in Morocco are the Jbel Ouiharem augen gneiss and Oued Assemlil gneiss. The augen gneisses and metadolerite of the Zenaga Series experienced composite foliation, likely related to an ancient orogeny. The Zenaga Series is intruded by Paleoproterozoic granitoids, giving a young age constraint within the Precambrian. Granites from the Anti-Atlas Mountains yielded similar ages.

North of Kerdous, the Quartzite Series formed thick quartzite layers, along with siltstone, pelite sandstones and conglomerates in the Neoproterozoic, with intercalated stromatolite limestones. Sills and laccoliths of dolerite and a gabbro tholeiitic magma series intruded the Quartzite Series along sedimentary bedding.

Morocco was affected by the Pan-African orogeny, which produced the Ouarzazate Series molasse deposit.

=== Paleozoic (539-251 million years ago) ===
The Adoudounian Series overlies the Ouarzazate and marks the start of the Cambrian, formed in parallel with the rapid expansion of multicellular life. The base of series is conglomerate, followed by marl, sandstones and additional carbonate sequences. The Amouslek Formation, within the Adounian Series is made up of shale and limestone and is laden with trilobite and archaeocyathid fossils, from an Early Cambrian shallow marine environment. The Goulimine Quartzitic Series from the Middle Cambrian also contains trilobites, although the Late Cambrian is not exposed.

Sandstones, micaceous clays and some limestones form Ordovician strata overly the Cambrian, containing trilobite and graptolite fossils. The Late Ordovician and the start of the Silurian is marked by a glaciation, recorded in tillite. Silurian strata is common in the central Anti-Atlas, represented by sandstones, shales and dark mudstones that sometimes contain carbonate nodules. Black shales in the eastern Anti-Atlas host some graptolites, lamellibranch and nautiloid fossils. Devonian mudstones with limestone beds unconformably overly the Late Silurian in the western Anti-Atlas, with brachiopod, conodont and tentaculite fossils, while basalts are found in the east. Carboniferous form the northern edge of the Tindouf Basin and cuesta hills in the Draa plains. Condensed limestone, with cephalopod fossils from the period, was uplifted as platforms in the central and eastern Anti-Atlas.

The Anti-Atlas did not experience significant tectonic changes during the Hercynian orogeny, as Euramerica and Gondwana collided to form the supercontinent Pangaea. The mountains have very little, if any metamorphism, from the time and no Hercynian granites.

The Meseta Domain, taking its name from Spain's Meseta Central inner plateau is an area of stable Paleozoic rock that was never affected by the Hercynian orogeny and was later covered by Mesozoic and Cenozoic sedimentary rocks. Forming Morocco's Central Massif, the Meseta Domain completely conceals Precambrian rocks, although boreholes have found Neoproterozoic rocks in a Meseta anticline. The domain is split in two by the Middle Atlas fold belt. The Western Meseta has relatively little sedimentary cover and well-developed massifs, while the Eastern Meseta spanning the border with Algeria has numerous, small Paleozoic massifs. Continuing from the Neoproterozoic until the Middle Devonian, western Morocco and the Anti-Atlas had the same depositional environment—molasse redbed deposition and post-orogeny volcanism. Southern Morocco was flooded by a massive shallow marine shelf, building up significant carbonates, mixed with continental sediments pouring in from inland areas now in the Sahara. In the Late Devonian, western Morocco and the Anti-Atlas split up into fault-bounded basins, which deformed during the Hercynian orogeny.

=== Mesozoic (251-66 million years ago) ===
The Western High Atlas preserves evidence of the formation of the Atlantic margin in North Africa. In the Late Triassic, rifting in central Pangaea began to form the Atlantic Ocean. Large alluvial fans began to fill the down-dropped grabens with fluvial sandstones, mudstones and conglomerates, intercalated with evaporite sequences of dolomite, halite and gypsum. A tholeiitic magma series formed dolerite, capping off the Triassic sequence. Clastic sediments continued to deposit into the Jurassic. Simultaneously, in the Middle Jurassic, limestone shoals formed on fault blocks and chaotic olistostrome slump deposits accumulated limestone fragments in nearby deep water.

The Rifo-Tellian Domain (also known as the Rif Domain) today extends the entire length of the Maghreb and is closely related to the Baetic System mountains in southern Spain. The sediments in the Rif Mountains deposited in the present location of Tunisia in the Triassic, as part of a microcontinent.

A large scale marine transgression in the Cretaceous, timed with subsidence in the region led to the maximum extent of seas in Morocco. By the end of the Cretaceous, a marine regression dropped sea levels in the area as the Atlas Mountains began to rise. River delta fans prograded filled in the Atlas gulf from east to west. Border faults formed, thrusting pieces of Mesozoic rock onto neighboring platforms. The uplifted sedimentary rocks in the trough began to erode into new alluvial fans, filling in marginal foredeep areas.

=== Cenozoic (66 million years ago-present) ===
The Rif microcontinent shifted westward and collided with the African Plate in the Oligocene and the Miocene, generated the complex Rift overthrust. Seismic studies have found that Carnian sandstones, mudstones and conglomerates from the Triassic, lie unconformably atop the microcontinent's crystalline basement rock in north Morocco. The Miocene and Pliocene marls and carbonates of the Doukkala sub-basin are overlain by Quaternary rocks. Further west, Quaternary rocks cover Middle Cretaceous sedimentary rocks, which lie unconformably atop Triassic and Paleozoic units.

== Hydrogeology ==
Quaternary alluvial aquifers form in river basins throughout the country. Low permeability clay and silt divided these deposits into multilayer aquifers and they typically range between five and 150 meters deep, with recharge from rainwater and Atlas Mountains runoff. The Meseta region has small, unconfined fractured igneous rock aquifers, with low permeability and low productivity.

Paleozoic, Mesozoic and Cenozoic sandstone aquifers in the northern plains and around Tadla, Saïsis and Tensift range between 10 and 200 meters thick. In some places, groundwater from these sandstones is very saline, due to dissolved Triassic and Jurassic evaporites. A few deep karst aquifers are found beneath the Tadla, Fes-Sais and Essaouira plains, along with the Atlas Mountains and the Anti-Atlas Mountains. These karst aquifers are almost universally high quality and produce some important springs.

The Anti-Atlas Mountains also have high productivity fractured Cambrian karst, together with low-productivity, crystalline Precambrian basement rock.

== Natural resource geology ==
Mining is an important part of the economy of Morocco. The country is a major exporter of phosphates and remains well positioned for peak phosphorus shortages through its occupation of Western Sahara, which holds much of the world's supply. In fact, the two open pit mines at Khouribga, in Morocco itself, forms the largest phosphate mine in the world. Metal mining for lead, copper, silver and zinc resurged in the 1990s, at the Douar Hajar mine 30 kilometers south of Marrakesh. El Heimer, 20 kilometers southeast of Oujda in the northeast, is the only active lead smelter in North Africa.

A large salt deposit, related to a marine transgression in the Triassic, is mined 10 kilometers east of Mohammedia. The folded and recrystallized salt is more than 98 percent pure and reaches a thickness of 80 meters.
