= Abdel Kharrazi =

Moroccan footballer (1976–2023)

Personal information
- Date of birth: 20 September 1976
- Place of birth: Errachidia, Morocco
- Date of death: 25 October 2023 (aged 47)
- Place of death: Sète, France
- Height: 1.86 m (6 ft 1 in)
- Position: Defender

Senior career*
Years	Team	Apps	(Gls)
1995–2017	Sète 34	197	(9)
Total		197	(9)
- * Club domestic league appearances and goals

Abdel Kharrazi (20 September 1976 – 25 October 2023) was a Moroccan footballer who played as a defender.

== Biography ==
Born in Errachidia on 20 September 1976, Kharrazi joined FC Sète 34 in 1995, playing 33 matches with the club in Ligue 2 during the 2005–06 season. On 9 October 2013, while returning from injury, he ruptured his anterior cruciate ligament and ended his season.

Abdel Kharrazi died from ALS in Sète on 25 October 2023, at the age of 47.
