= Goulmima =

Goulmima ݣلميمة ⴳⵓⵍⵎⵉⵎⴰ Tizi n Imnayen
- Town
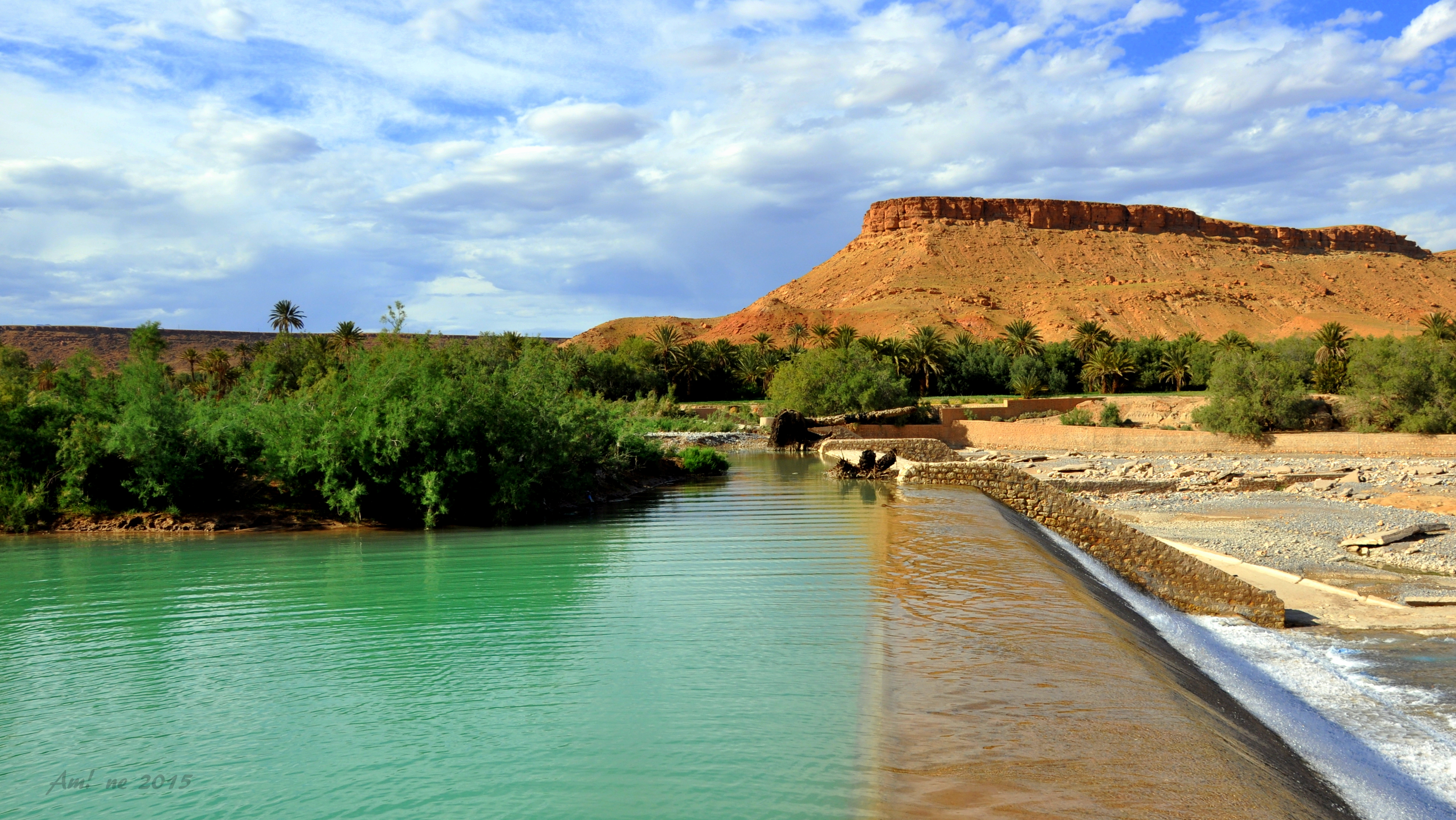
- Interactive map of Goulmima
- Coordinates: 31°41′40″N 4°57′33″W
- Country: Morocco
- Region: Drâa-Tafilalet
- Province: Errachidia
- Elevation: 1,018 m (3,340 ft)

Population (2009)
  - Total: 17 952

Goulmima (Arabic: ݣلميمة, Standard Moroccan Tamazight: ⴳⵓⵍⵎⵉⵎⴰ), also known as Tizi n Imnayen, is a town in Morocco situated in Errachidia Province, in the region of Drâa-Tafilalet. An agricultural oasis, it is fed by the Wadi Gheris from the central High Atlas mountains. Like other settlements in Tafilalet, it was built as a fortified village or ksar. One of the most important ones, (Ksar Goulmima), is in the process of restoration. Not just a historical location, several hundred people still live in the ksar.

== Notable people ==
- Abdelhamid Sabiri, Professional footballer
