= Bouarfa, Morocco =

Coordinates: 32.530899°N 1.96496°W

Bouarfa ⴱⵓⵄⴰⵔⴼⴰ بوعرفة Bou 'rfa
- City
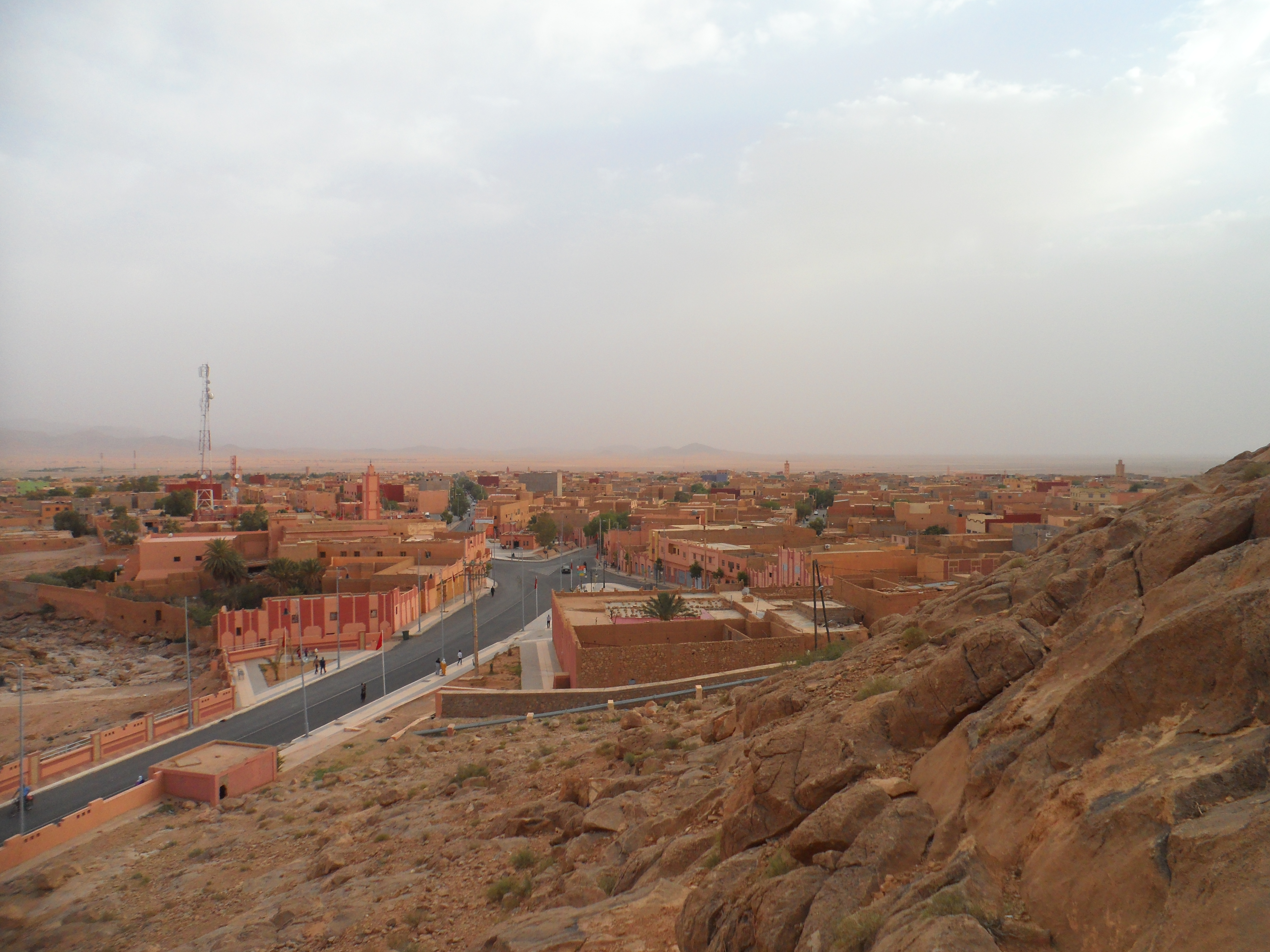
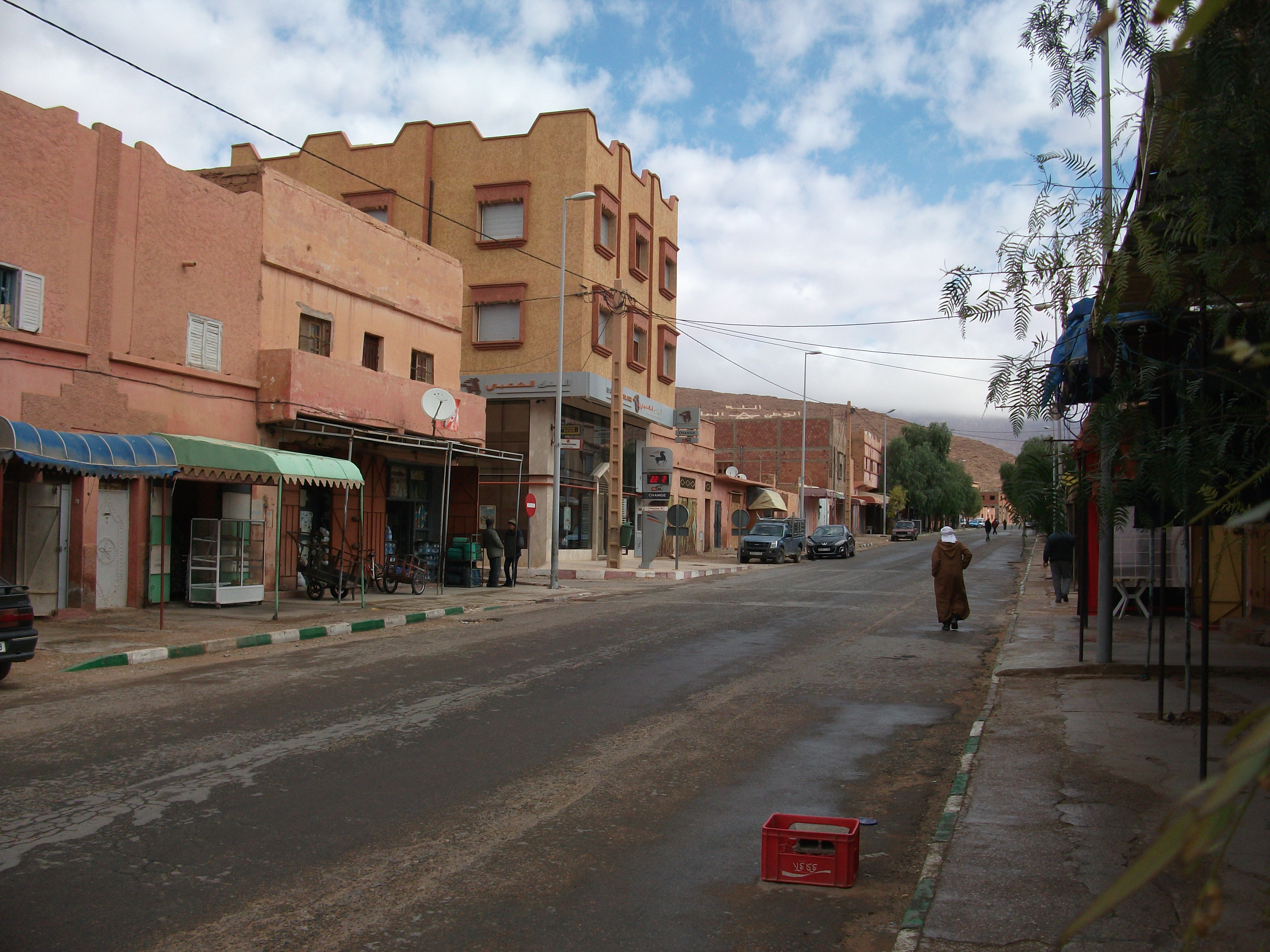
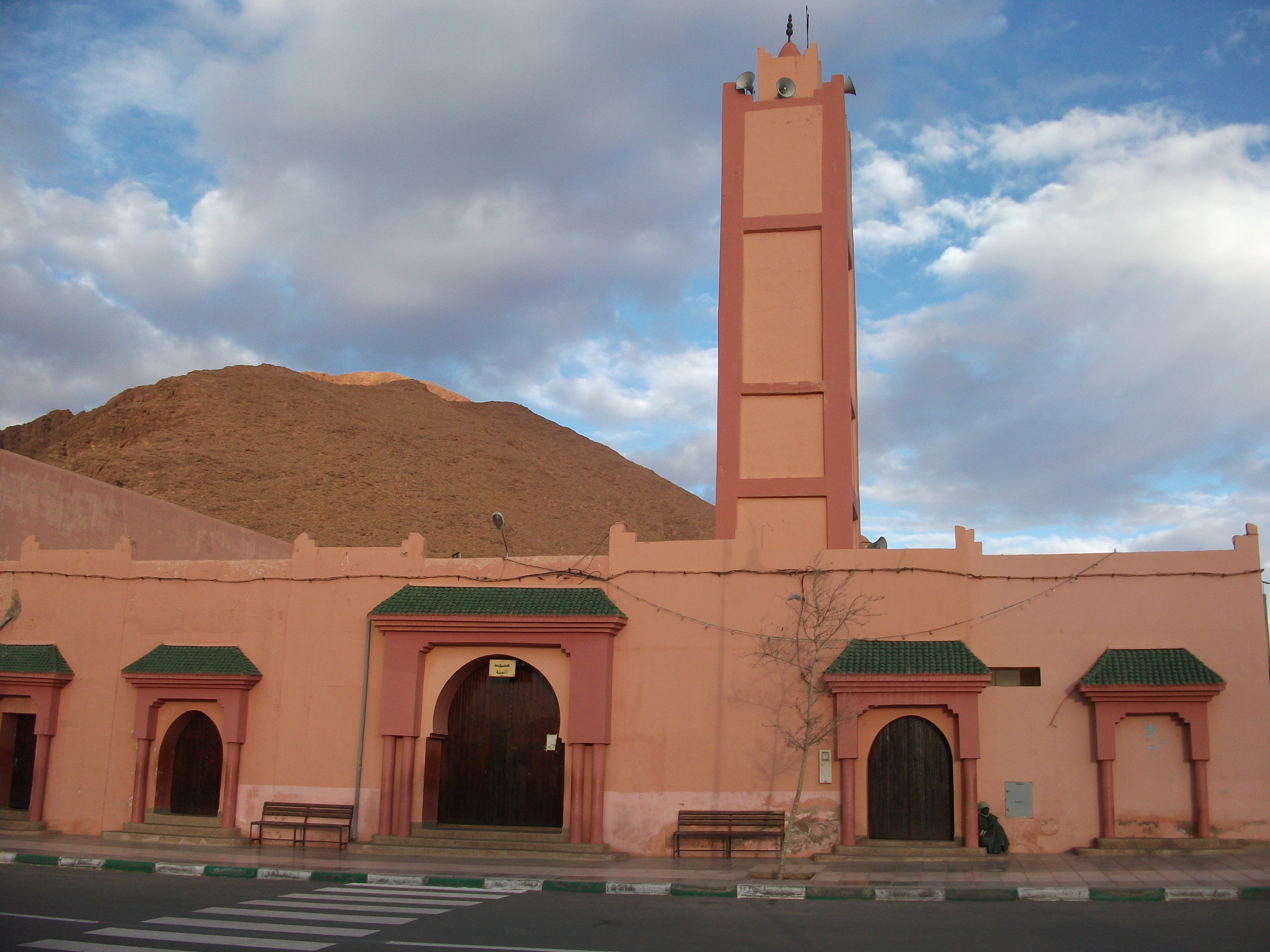
- Interactive map of Bouarfa
- Country: Morocco
- Region: Oriental
- Province: Figuig
- Elevation: 1,174 m (3,852 ft)

Population (2014)
  - Total: 28,846
- Time zone: UTC+0 (GMT)

Bouarfa (Note: Arabic: بوعرفة Berber languages: ⴱⵓⵄⴰⵔⴼⴰ) is a city in Oriental Region, northeastern Morocco and the capital of Figuig Province. According to the 2004 census, it had a population of 24,527.

== Climate ==
Climate data for Bouarfa (1991–2020)
Month	Jan	Feb	Mar	Apr	May	Jun	Jul	Aug	Sep	Oct	Nov	Dec	Year
Record high °C (°F)	24.1 (75.4)	27.0 (80.6)	30.9 (87.6)	34.4 (93.9)	38.6 (101.5)	41.6 (106.9)	43.4 (110.1)	42.1 (107.8)	39.2 (102.6)	35.0 (95.0)	28.5 (83.3)	23.5 (74.3)	43.4 (110.1)
Mean daily maximum °C (°F)	13.9 (57.0)	16.0 (60.8)	19.9 (67.8)	23.8 (74.8)	28.6 (83.5)	34.1 (93.4)	38.6 (101.5)	37.3 (99.1)	31.8 (89.2)	25.4 (77.7)	18.5 (65.3)	14.5 (58.1)	25.2 (77.4)
Daily mean °C (°F)	7.9 (46.2)	9.8 (49.6)	13.6 (56.5)	17.3 (63.1)	21.8 (71.2)	27.0 (80.6)	31.3 (88.3)	30.3 (86.5)	25.1 (77.2)	19.3 (66.7)	12.8 (55.0)	8.9 (48.0)	18.8 (65.8)
Mean daily minimum °C (°F)	1.9 (35.4)	3.6 (38.5)	7.2 (45.0)	10.7 (51.3)	14.9 (58.8)	19.8 (67.6)	24.0 (75.2)	23.2 (73.8)	18.4 (65.1)	13.2 (55.8)	7.0 (44.6)	3.3 (37.9)	12.3 (54.1)
Record low °C (°F)	−8.0 (17.6)	−7.1 (19.2)	−2.8 (27.0)	1.0 (33.8)	3.9 (39.0)	9.5 (49.1)	15.4 (59.7)	14.7 (58.5)	7.4 (45.3)	1.0 (33.8)	−2.7 (27.1)	−3.7 (25.3)	−8.0 (17.6)
Average precipitation mm (inches)	9.6 (0.38)	10.4 (0.41)	19.8 (0.78)	13.5 (0.53)	10.8 (0.43)	7.2 (0.28)	3.1 (0.12)	11.4 (0.45)	19.9 (0.78)	24.9 (0.98)	21.0 (0.83)	11.8 (0.46)	163.4 (6.43)
Average precipitation days (≥ 1.0 mm)	2.4	1.8	2.8	2.3	1.7	1.2	0.8	2.6	3.4	2.6	2.7	2.0	26.3
Source: NOAA
