= Bouanane =

Coordinates: 32°1′39″N 3°02′24″W

- Rural commune
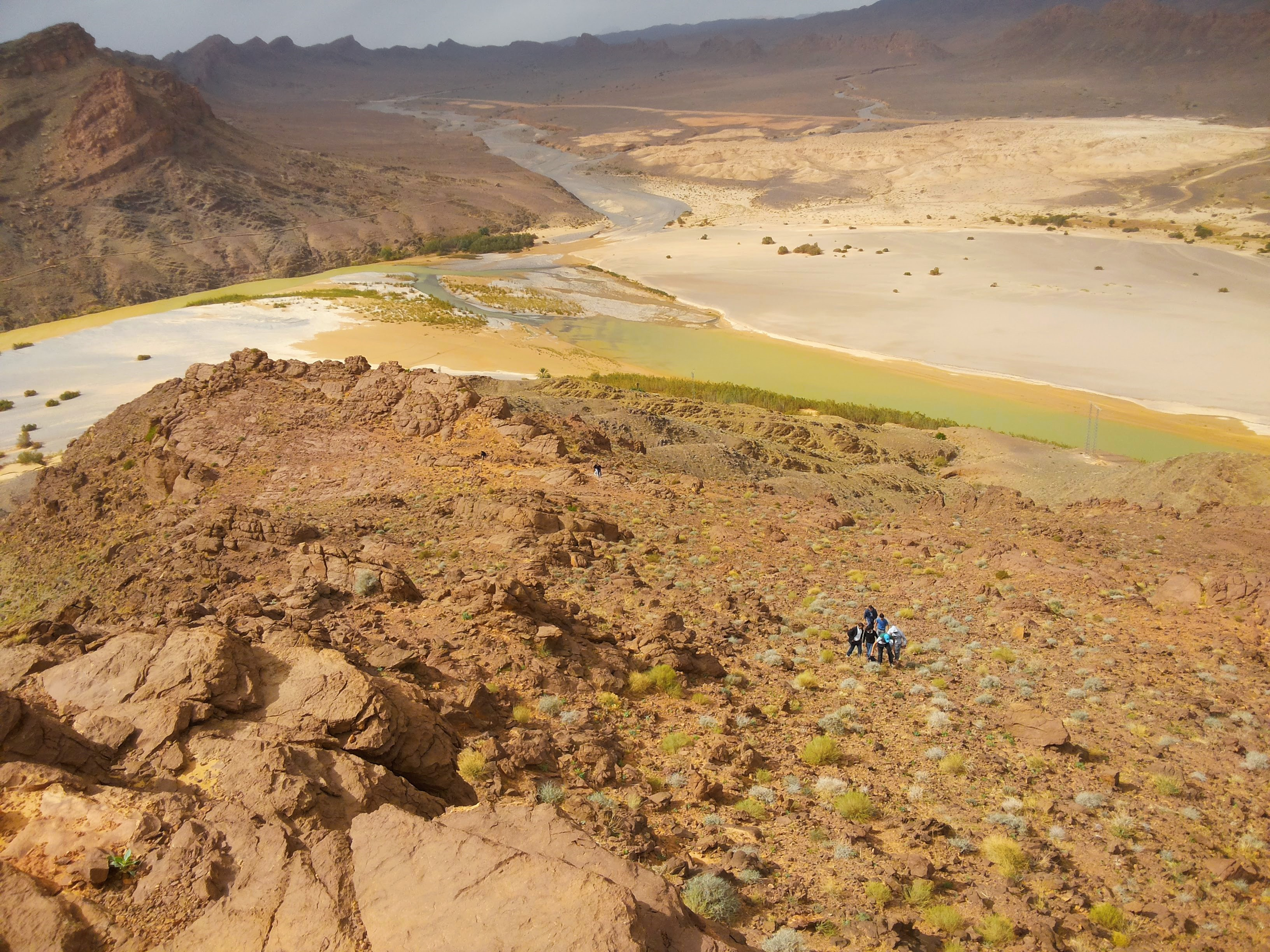
- Interactive map of Bouanane
- Country: Morocco
- Region: Oriental
- Province: Figuig

Population (2014)
  - Rural commune: 10,035
  - Urban: 3,329
- Time zone: UTC+0 (GMT)

Bouanane is a town and rural commune in Figuig Province, Oriental, Morocco. According to the 2004 census, the town had a population of 3,254.
