= Errachidia =

Errachidia الرشيدية ⵕⵕⴰⵛⵉⴷⵉⵢⵢⴰ
- City
- Ksar es-Souk / Imetgharen

- Coat of arms
- Interactive map of Errachidia
- Coordinates: 31°55′55″N 4°25′28″W
- Country: Morocco
- Region: Drâa-Tafilalet
- Province: Errachidia
- Elevation: 1,009 m (3,310 ft)

Population (2024)
  - Total: 97,687

Errachidia (Arabic: الرشيدية, romanized: al-Rāshīdiyya), formerly known as Ksar es-Souk, (Arabic: قصر السوق, romanized: Qaṣr as-Sūq) or Imetgharen (Standard Moroccan Tamazight: ⵉⵎⵜⵖⴰⵔⵏ, romanized: Imtɣaren) is a city in Morocco, it serves as the capital of the Drâa-Tafilalet region, it is also the seat and namesake of Errachidia Province.

The city sits directly downstream from the Hassan Addakhil dam.

As of the 2024 Moroccan census, it had a population of 97,687 inhabitants.

== Toponymy ==
Formerly officially known as "Ksar es-Souk" (Arabic: قصر السوق, romanized: Qaṣr as-Sūq, lit. 'fortified village of the market'), the city was renamed Errachidia around 1975 in honor of the second son of Hassan II, Moulay Rachid.

== Culture ==
Located on the banks of the Ziz river, the city is considered part of the Tafilalt region, and is famous for its Medjool dates.

The city was part of the route of the 2006 and 2007 Dakar Rally.

== Climate ==
Errachidia has a hot desert climate (Köppen climate classification BWh). The highest temperature ever registered in Errachidia was 43.9 °C (111.0 °F), on July 17, 2021.

Climate data for Errachidia (1991–2020)
Month	Jan	Feb	Mar	Apr	May	Jun	Jul	Aug	Sep	Oct	Nov	Dec	Year
Record high °C (°F)	27.0 (80.6)	28.2 (82.8)	32.3 (90.1)	36.3 (97.3)	39.5 (103.1)	41.9 (107.4)	44.7 (112.5)	43.7 (110.7)	39.7 (103.5)	36.6 (97.9)	29.8 (85.6)	26.7 (80.1)	44.7 (112.5)
Mean daily maximum °C (°F)	15.9 (60.6)	18.2 (64.8)	22.1 (71.8)	26.1 (79.0)	30.3 (86.5)	35.4 (95.7)	39.5 (103.1)	38.2 (100.8)	32.9 (91.2)	26.8 (80.2)	20.6 (69.1)	16.7 (62.1)	26.9 (80.4)
Daily mean °C (°F)	9.0 (48.2)	11.4 (52.5)	15.6 (60.1)	19.6 (67.3)	23.8 (74.8)	28.7 (83.7)	32.7 (90.9)	31.5 (88.7)	26.4 (79.5)	20.5 (68.9)	14.1 (57.4)	10.1 (50.2)	20.3 (68.5)
Mean daily minimum °C (°F)	2.0 (35.6)	4.6 (40.3)	8.8 (47.8)	13.0 (55.4)	17.3 (63.1)	22.0 (71.6)	25.8 (78.4)	24.9 (76.8)	19.9 (67.8)	14.2 (57.6)	7.7 (45.9)	3.5 (38.3)	13.6 (56.5)
Record low °C (°F)	−8.1 (17.4)	−4.5 (23.9)	−0.4 (31.3)	4.8 (40.6)	5.4 (41.7)	12.2 (54.0)	16.5 (61.7)	16.3 (61.3)	11.7 (53.1)	6.1 (43.0)	−0.6 (30.9)	−3.8 (25.2)	−8.1 (17.4)
Average precipitation mm (inches)	10.0 (0.39)	12.6 (0.50)	14.0 (0.55)	9.4 (0.37)	8.7 (0.34)	5.6 (0.22)	3.1 (0.12)	6.3 (0.25)	18.2 (0.72)	20.8 (0.82)	16.3 (0.64)	8.0 (0.31)	133.0 (5.24)
Average precipitation days (≥ 1 mm)	1.4	1.7	1.9	1.4	1.5	1.3	0.9	1.7	2.8	2.8	2.4	1.5	21.3
Mean monthly sunshine hours	252.3	242.6	277.1	294.5	317.0	315.8	310.1	293.8	267.0	262.3	246.7	242.3	3,321.5
Source: NOAA (sun 1981–2010)

== Transport ==
The city is served by Moulay Ali Cherif Airport.

== Notable people ==
- Abdalaati Iguider - 1500m runner
- Rachid Neqrouz - Former footballer
- Mohamed Ounajem - professional footballer
- Yehiel Lasri - Mayor of Ashdod
- Moshe Bar-Asher - Israeli linguist
- Meir Sheetrit - Israeli Politician
- Sami Shalom Chetrit - Israeli author, academic and activist
- Mohamed Kherrazi - Dutch basketball player
- Abdel Kharrazi - Moroccan footballer
- Abdelaziz El Omari - Moroccan politician
