= Tinejdad =

Tinejdad تنجداد
- City
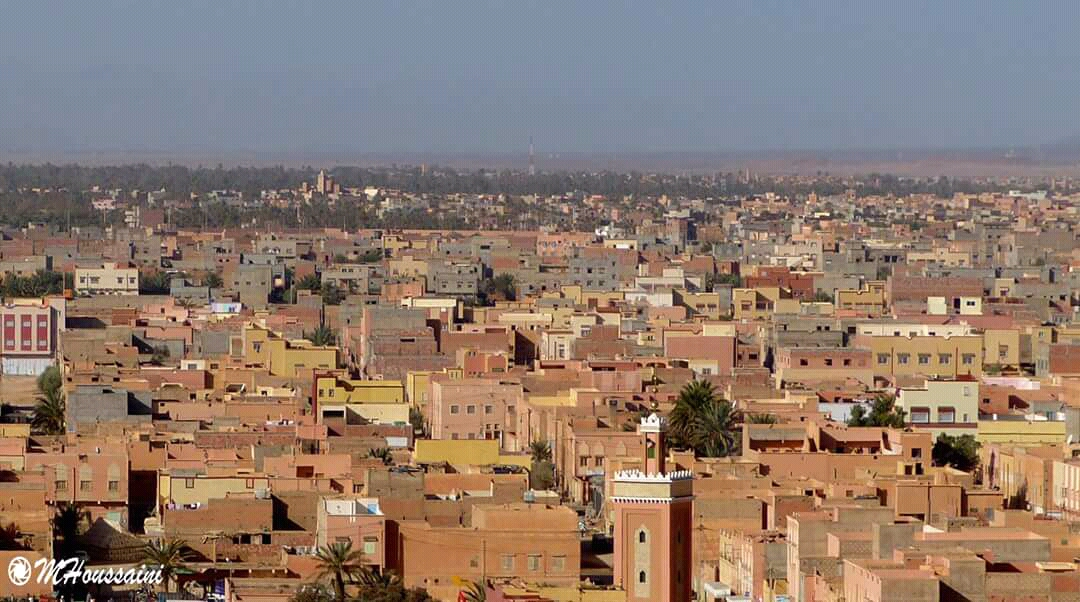
- Interactive map of Tinejdad
- Coordinates: 31°30′N 5°01′W
- Country: Morocco
- Region: Drâa-Tafilalet
- Province: Errachidia

Population (2024)
  - Total: 9,528
- Time zone: UTC+0 (GMT)

Tinejdad (Arabic: تنجداد) is a city in Errachidia Province, Drâa-Tafilalet, Morocco. According to the 2024 census it has a population of 9,528.
