= Tendrara =

Coordinates: 33°03′N 2°00′W

- Rural commune
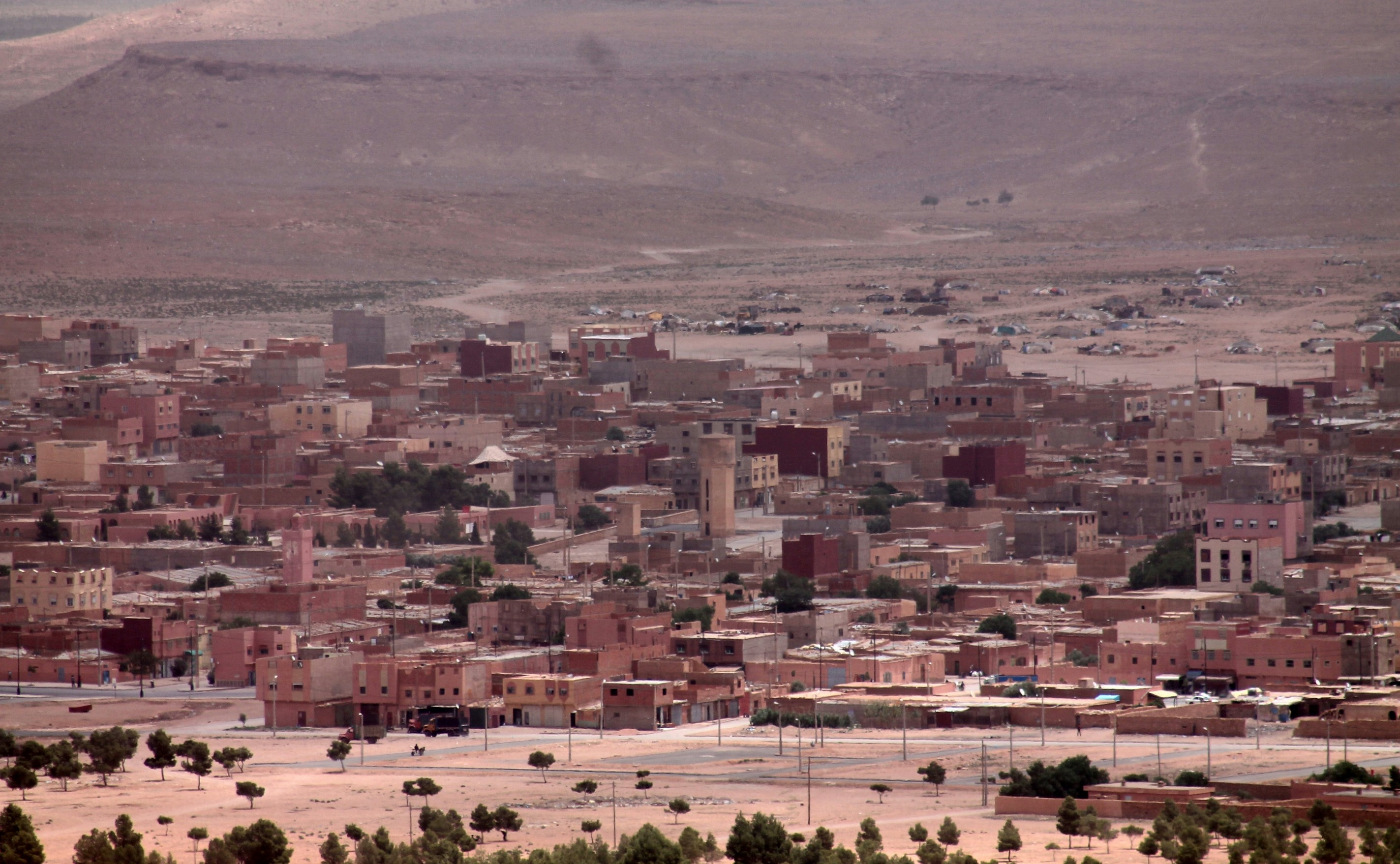
- Interactive map of Tendrara
- Country: Morocco
- Region: Oriental
- Province: Figuig
- Elevation: 1,450 m (4,760 ft)

Population (2014)
  - Rural commune: 15,390
  - Urban: 8,507
- Time zone: UTC+0 (GMT)

Tendrara is a town and rural commune in Figuig Province, Oriental, Morocco. According to the 2004 census, the town had a population of 6,254.

Near Tendrara, there was a labour camp (French: camp de travail) for Jews during the Vichy era. The prisoners who labored there: Jews from Warsaw, Leipzig, Salzburg, and Bucharest as well as Spaniards and others lived in tents.

== See also ==
- Concentration camps in France
