= Figuig Province =

Coordinates: 32°07′00″N 1°13′37″W

Figuig Province إقليم فكيك ⵜⴰⵙⴳⴰ ⵏ ⴼⵉⴳⵉⴳ
- Province
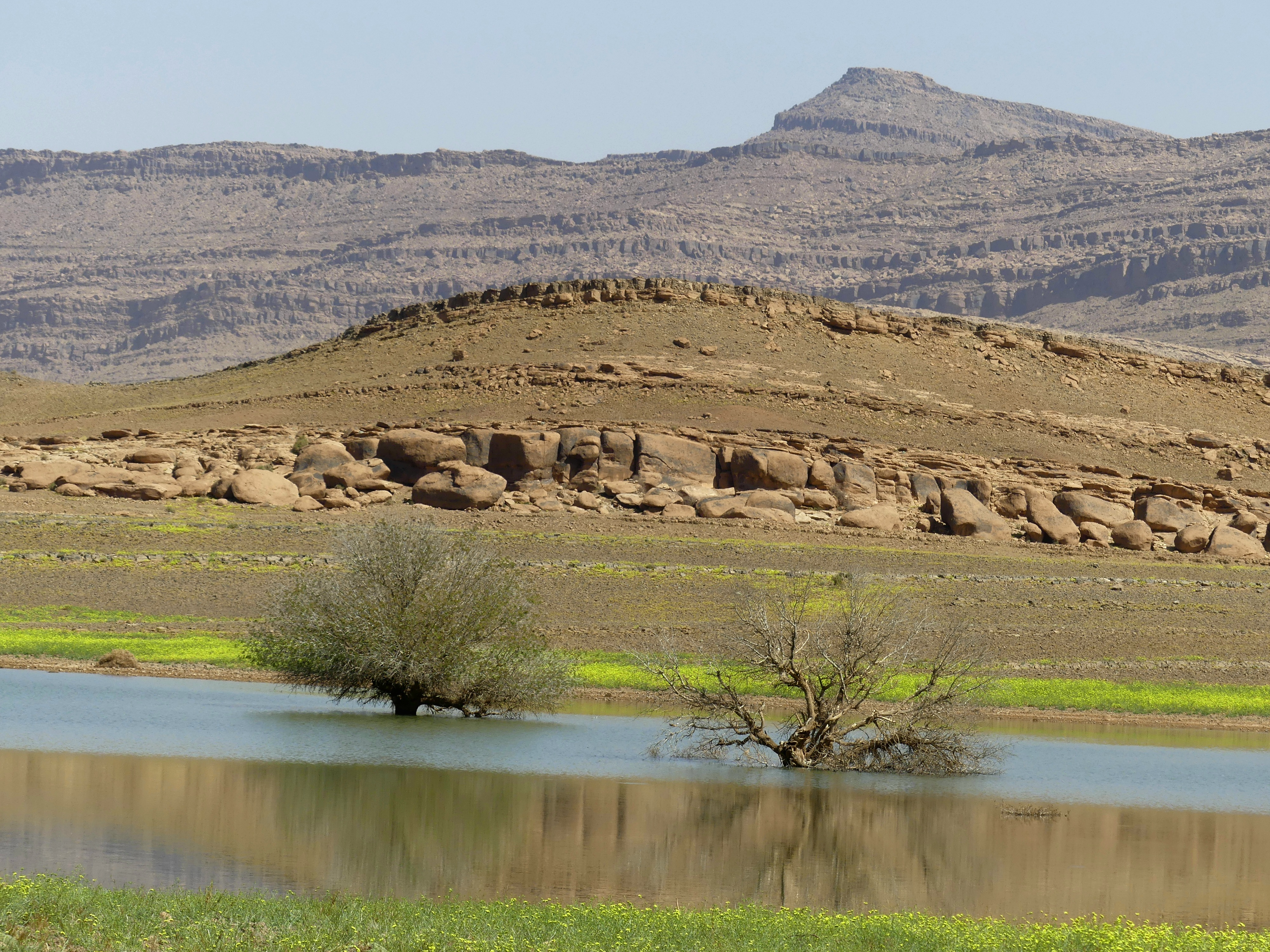
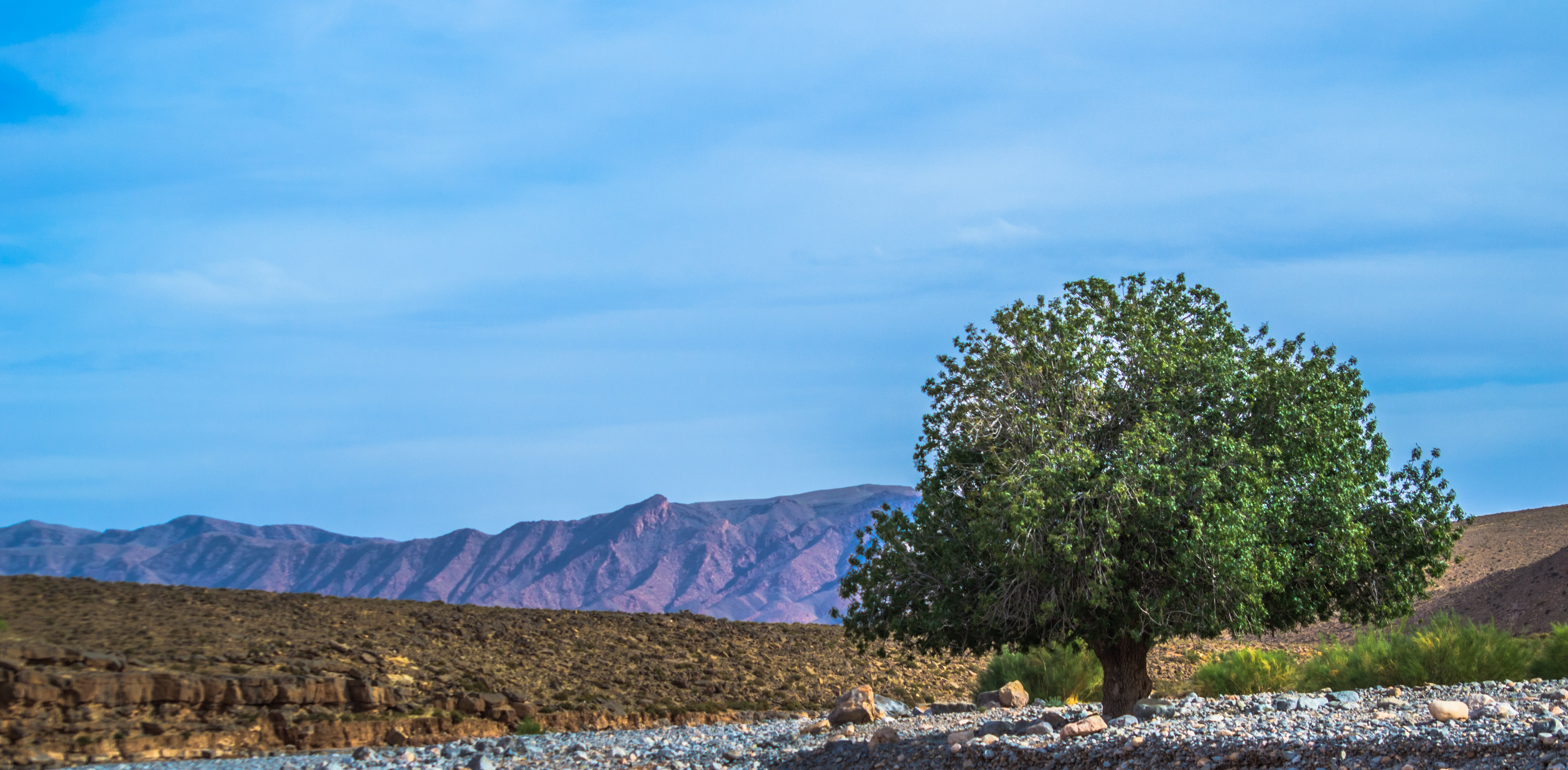

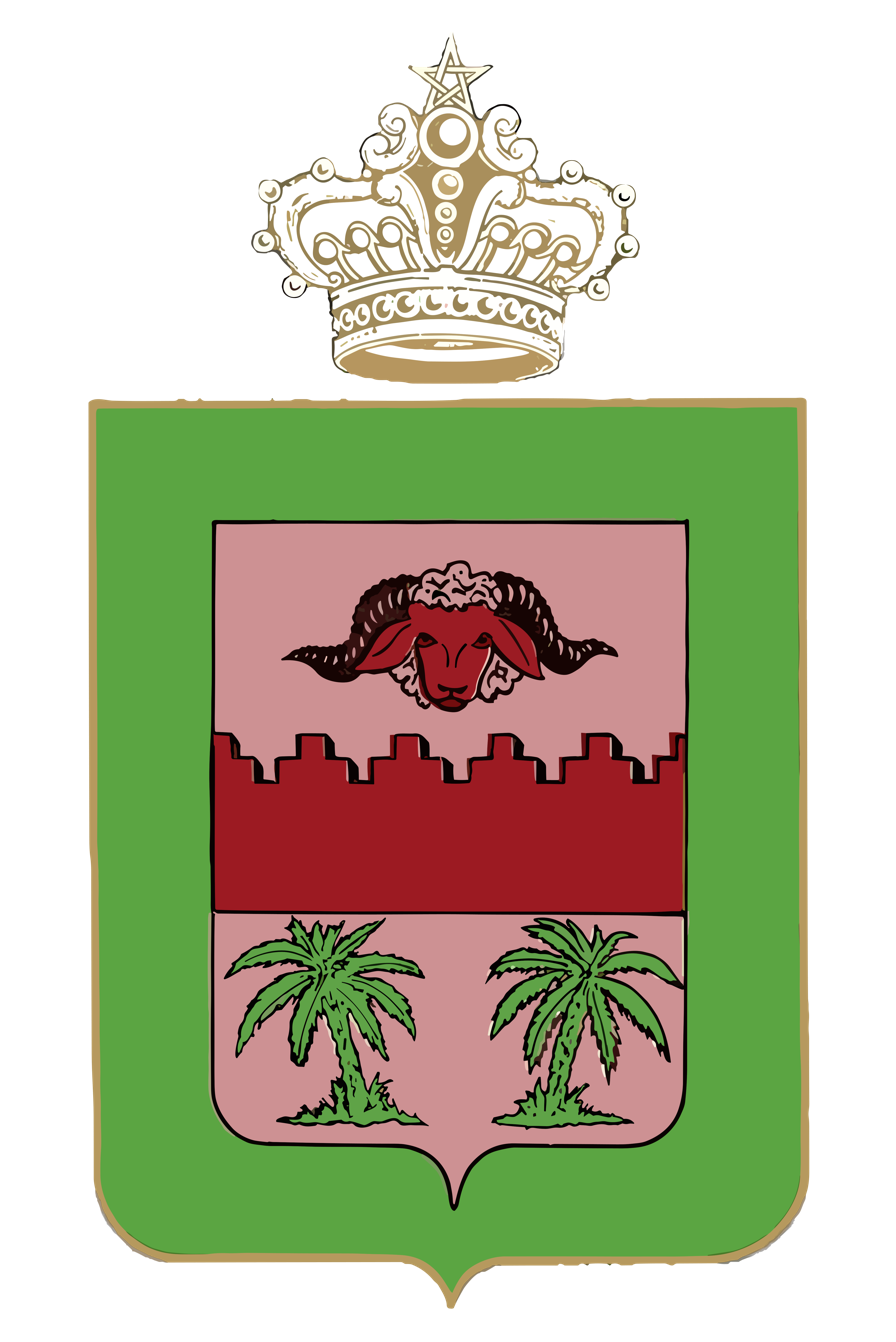
- Seal
- Interactive map of Figuig Province
- Country: Morocco
- Region: Oriental
- Capital: Bouarfa

Population (2014)
  - Total: 138,325

The Figuig Province (Arabic: إقليم فكيك, Standard Moroccan Tamazight: ⵜⴰⵙⴳⴰ ⵏ ⴼⵉⴳⵉⴳ) is a province of the Oriental Region in Morocco. Its capital is Bouarfa. According to the 2014 Moroccan census, it had a population of 138,325, compared to 129,430 recorded in 2004.

== Geography ==
The province is located in the eastern part of Morocco, within the Oriental Region. It is characterized by predominantly rural areas and a low population density.

The main towns and cities of the province include:

- Bni Tadjite
- Bouanane
- Bouarfa
- Figuig
- Talssint
- Tendrara

== Administrative divisions ==
According to the administrative division established in 2008 and amended in 2011, the province is subdivided into several municipalities and rural communes.

== Demographics ==
The population of Figuig Province was recorded at 138,325 in the 2014 Moroccan census, up from 129,430 in 2004.
