= Adoudounian =

Obsolete geological stage at the transition between the Ediacarian and the Cambrian

The Adoudounien (or Adoudounian) is an obsolete geological stage used in North Africa to characterise stratigraphic formations located at the transition between the Ediacarian (last period of the Neoproterozoic) and the Cambrian (first period of the Paleozoic). While largely used in the scientific literature in the 20th century and still common in articles related to the geology of Morocco, the definition of this unofficial term remains blurry and no start and end dates where associated to it.
