= Moshe Bar-Asher =

Israeli linguist (born 1939)

Professor Moshe Bar-Asher משה בר-אשר
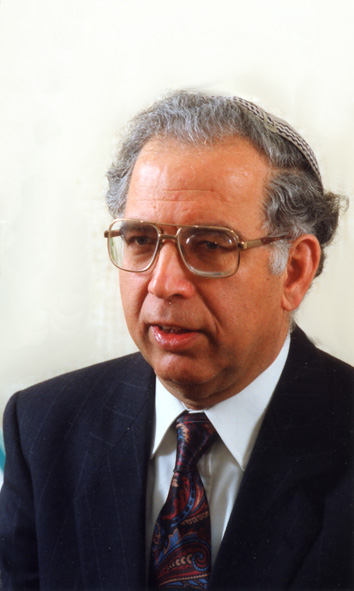
- Born: June 29, 1939 (age 86); Errachidia, Morocco
- Occupation: Linguist
- Known for: President of the Academy of the Hebrew Language
- Awards: Israel Prize (1993)

Moshe Bar-Asher (Hebrew: משה בר-אשר; born 1939, Ksar es Souk, Morocco) is an Israeli linguist and the former president of the Academy of the Hebrew Language in Jerusalem.

== Biography ==
Moshe Ben Harush (later Bar-Asher) was born in Ksar es Souk (modern Errachidia), Morocco. He immigrated to Israel in 1951 when he was twelve years old.

Bar-Asher received his PhD from the Hebrew University in 1976.

== Academic career ==
Between 1981 and 1983 he was chair of Hebrew University's Department of the Hebrew Language. From 1983 to 1986 he served as chair of the university's Institute for Jewish Studies. In 1987 he became vice president of the Academy of the Hebrew Language, of which he was appointed president in 1993.

Bar-Asher's scholarship focuses on Rabbinic Hebrew, Palestinian Syriac and Jewish languages.

== Awards and recognition ==
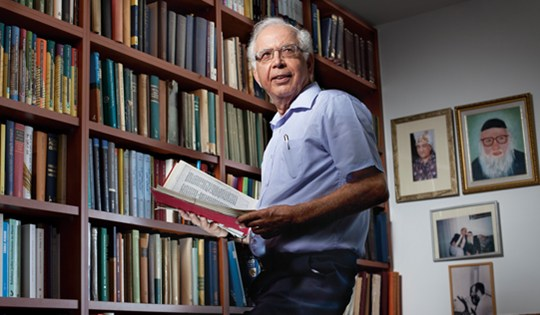
Moshe Bar-Asher

- Eliezer Samson Rosenthal Prize for Talmudic studies (1988)
- Israel Prize in the field of Hebrew language and Jewish languages (1993)
- Honorary doctorate from the Institut National des Langues et Civilisations Orientales (1995)
- Yitzhak Ben-Zvi Prize for research into the customs of Oriental Jewry (2002)
- Honorary doctorate from Haifa University (2005)
- Rothschild Prize (2008)
- EMET Prize (2012)

== Published works ==
- Bar-Asher, Moshe (1991). "Some observations on the revival of Hebrew". European Regional Development Conference for Jewish Civilization Studies.
- Bar-Asher, Moshe (1991). "Some usages of the Hebrew component in modern Judeo-Arabic". Massorot.
- Bar-Asher, Moshe (1990). "On corrections and marginal versions in Codex Parma B (De Rossi 497) of the Mishna". In Moshe Bar-Asher; et al. (eds.). Segulla to Ariella: Essays and Belles-letters in Memory of Ariella Deem Goldberg.
- Bar-Asher, Moshe (1989). "Some aspects of the study of the Hebrew component in Eastern and Western neo-Judeo-Arabic". Massorot.
- Bar-Asher, Moshe (1988). "The Sharh of the Maghreb: Judeo-Arabic exegesis of the Bible and other Jewish literature – Its nature and formulation". Studies in Jewish Languages – Bible Translations and Spoken Dialects.
- Bar-Asher, Moshe (1988). "Studies in Mishnaic Hebrew". Proceedings of the Academy of the Hebrew Language: 28–30.
- Bar-Asher, Moshe (1987). "The different traditions of Mishnaic Hebrew". In David M. Golomb (ed.). Working With No Data. pp. 1–38.
- Bar-Asher, Moshe (1986). "Linguistic studies in the manuscripts of the Mishna". Proceedings of the Israeli Academy of Sciences and Humanities: 183–210.

== Personal life ==
His brother is Professor Meir Bar Asher.

== See also ==
- List of Israel Prize recipients
