= Errachidia Province =

Province of Morocco

Errachidia Province إقليم الراشيدية ⵜⴰⵙⴳⴰ ⵏ ⵕⵕⴰⵛⵉⴷⵉⵢⵢⴰ
- Province
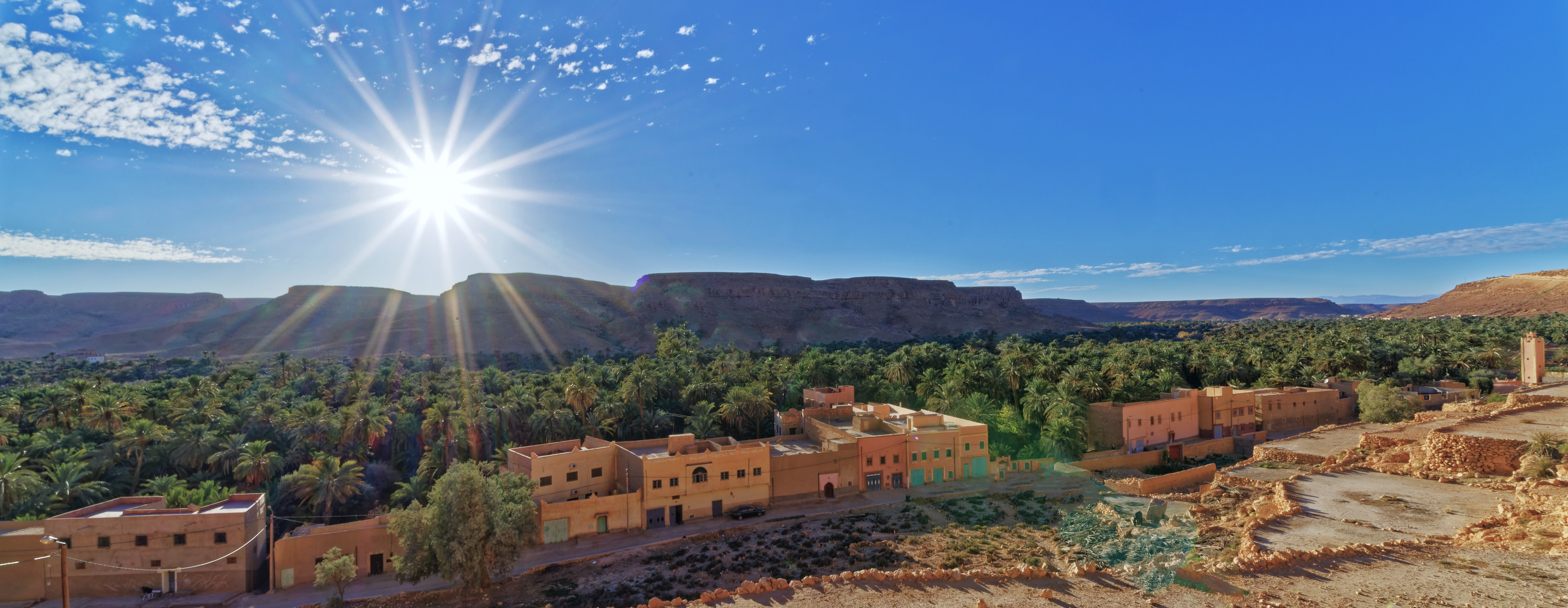
- Hassan Addakhil dam on the Ziz River The Tafilalt oasis Ksar Abbar, Rissani Merzouga seen from the Erg Chebbi dunes
- Interactive map of Errachidia Province
- Country: Morocco
- Region: Drâa-Tafilalet
- Capital: Errachidia

Government
  - Governor: Abdellah Amimi

Area
  - Total: 60,000 km^{2} (23,000 sq mi)

Population (2024)
  - Total: 427,572
  - Density: 7.1/km^{2} (18/sq mi)
- Time zone: UTC+00:00 (GMT)
- ISO 3166 code: MA-ERR

Errachidia (Arabic: إقليم الراشيدية; Standard Moroccan Tamazight: ⵜⴰⵙⴳⴰ ⵏ ⵕⵕⴰⵛⵉⴷⵉⵢⵢⴰ) is a province located in eastern central Morocco in the region of Dra-Tafilalt. largely corresponding to the Tafilalt and it's surroundings.

Errachidia is bordered by Algeria to the southeast and by the Moroccan provinces of Figuig to the northeast, Midelt to the north, Tinghir to the west, and Zagora to the southwest. It is considered to be one of the most historically important regions of Morocco.

The capital of the province is Errachidia, whose former name is Ksar Souk and Imetɣaren in the Berber language, was named in tribute to prince Moulay Rachid.

Merzouga south of the province is famous for its Erg Chebbi dunes.

== Cities ==
- Aoufous
- Boudnib
- Erfoud
- Errachidia
- Goulmima
- Jorf
- Rissani
- Tinejdad

== Subdivisions ==
The province is divided administratively into the following:

| Name | Geographic code | Type | Households | Population (2004) | Foreign population | Moroccan population | Notes |
|---|---|---|---|---|---|---|---|
| Arfoud | 201.01.01. | Municipality | 4035 | 23637 | 5 | 23632 | |
| Boudnib | 201.01.03. | Municipality | 1828 | 9867 | 1 | 9866 | |
| Errachidia | 201.01.05. | Municipality | 14624 | 76759 | 47 | 76712 | |
| Goulmima | 201.01.09. | Municipality | 3054 | 16593 | 3 | 16590 | |
| Jorf | 201.01.11. | Municipality | 1981 | 12135 | 1 | 12134 | |
| Moulay Ali Cherif | 201.01.13. | Municipality | 3251 | 20469 | 1 | 20468 | |
| Tinejdad | 201.01.15. | Municipality | 1289 | 7494 | 2 | 7492 | |
| Aarab Sebbah Gheris | 201.03.01. | Rural commune | 688 | 4937 | 0 | 4937 | |
| Aarab Sebbah Ziz | 201.03.03. | Rural commune | 2578 | 18332 | 1 | 18331 | |
| Es-Sifa | 201.03.07. | Rural commune | 1022 | 7881 | 0 | 7881 | |
| Fezna | 201.03.09. | Rural commune | 585 | 4087 | 1 | 4086 | |
| Amellagou | 201.05.03. | Rural commune | 890 | 5273 | 0 | 5273 | |
| Aoufous | 201.07.01. | Rural commune | 1929 | 11506 | 0 | 11506 | 1272 residents live in the center, called Aoufous; 10234 residents live in rural areas. |
| Chorfa M'Daghra | 201.07.03. | Rural commune | 2133 | 13803 | 0 | 13803 | |
| Er-Rteb | 201.07.05. | Rural commune | 2081 | 13324 | 1 | 13323 | |
| Lkheng | 201.07.07. | Rural commune | 2190 | 13017 | 1 | 13016 | |
| Oued Naam | 201.07.09. | Rural commune | 1000 | 5709 | 3 | 5706 | |
| Bni M'Hamed Sijelmassa | 201.11.01. | Rural commune | 2282 | 16709 | 0 | 16709 | |
| Er-Rissani | 201.11.03. | Rural commune | 727 | 5575 | 3 | 5572 | |
| Es-Sfalat | 201.11.05. | Rural commune | 2147 | 16163 | 0 | 16163 | |
| Et-Taous | 201.11.07. | Rural commune | 820 | 5337 | 1 | 5336 | |
| Sidi Ali | 201.11.09. | Rural commune | 385 | 3081 | 0 | 3081 | |
| Aghbalou N'Kerdous | 201.13.01. | Rural commune | 1306 | 9357 | 0 | 9357 | |
| Ferkla El Oulia | 201.13.03. | Rural commune | 3010 | 20214 | 2 | 20212 | |
| Ferkla Es-Soufla | 201.13.05. | Rural commune | 1713 | 12624 | 0 | 12624 | |
| Gheris El Ouloui | 201.13.07. | Rural commune | 1685 | 11879 | 0 | 11879 | |
| Gheris Es-Soufli | 201.13.09. | Rural commune | 1024 | 6742 | 0 | 6742 | |
| Melaab | 201.13.11. | Rural commune | 2340 | 16681 | 1 | 16680 | |
| Tadighoust | 201.13.13. | Rural commune | 1218 | 7346 | 1 | 7345 | |
