= Boudenib =

Boudenib Boudnib
- Town
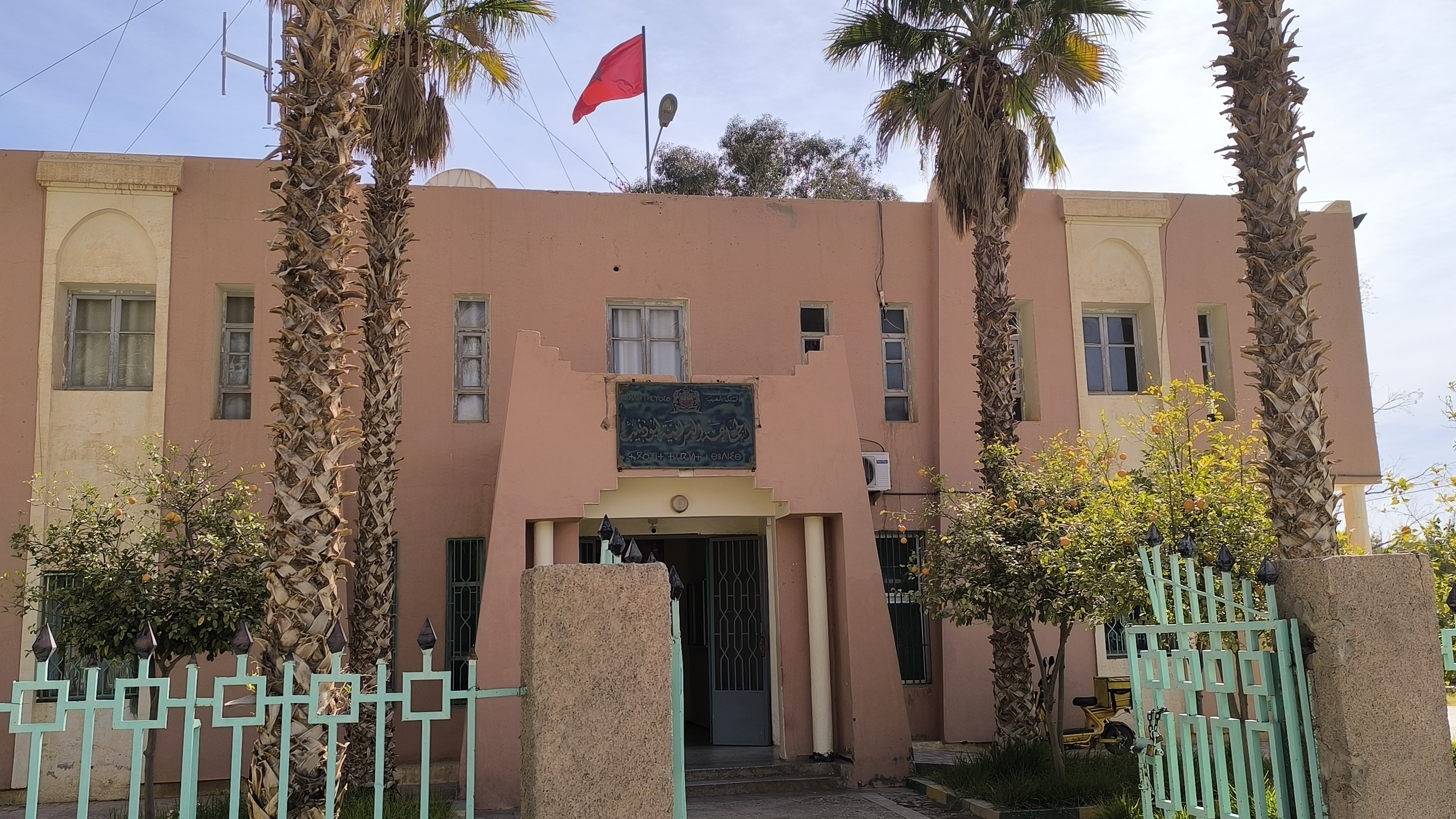
- Interactive map of Boudenib
- Coordinates: 31°56′59″N 3°36′28″W
- Country: Morocco
- Region: Drâa-Tafilalet
- Province: Errachidia
- Time zone: UTC+0 (GMT)

Boudenib (Berber:ⴱⵓⴷⵏⵉⴱ) (Arabic: بوذنيب) is a small Berber town in eastern Morocco, close to the border with Algeria, in the Atlas Mountains. According to the 2004 census it had a population of 9,867.

Kef Aziza, a cave which is nearly 4 km long, is close to Boudenib and is considered one of the six major caves of Morocco.
