= Kalaat M'Gouna =

Kalaat M'Gouna قلعة مݣونة / ⵜⵉⵖⵔⵎⵜ ⵏ ⵉⵎⴳⵓⵏⴻⵏ
- Town
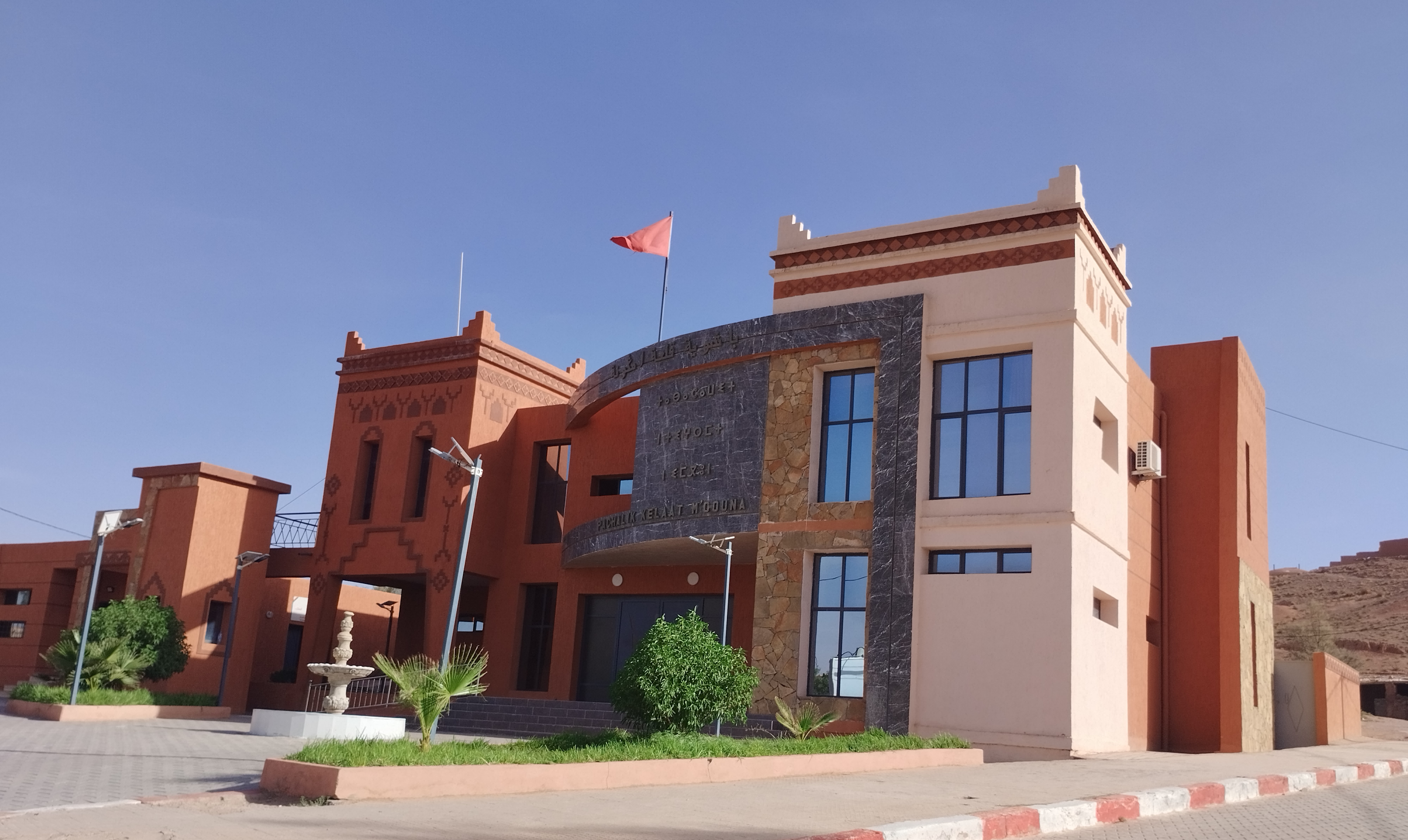
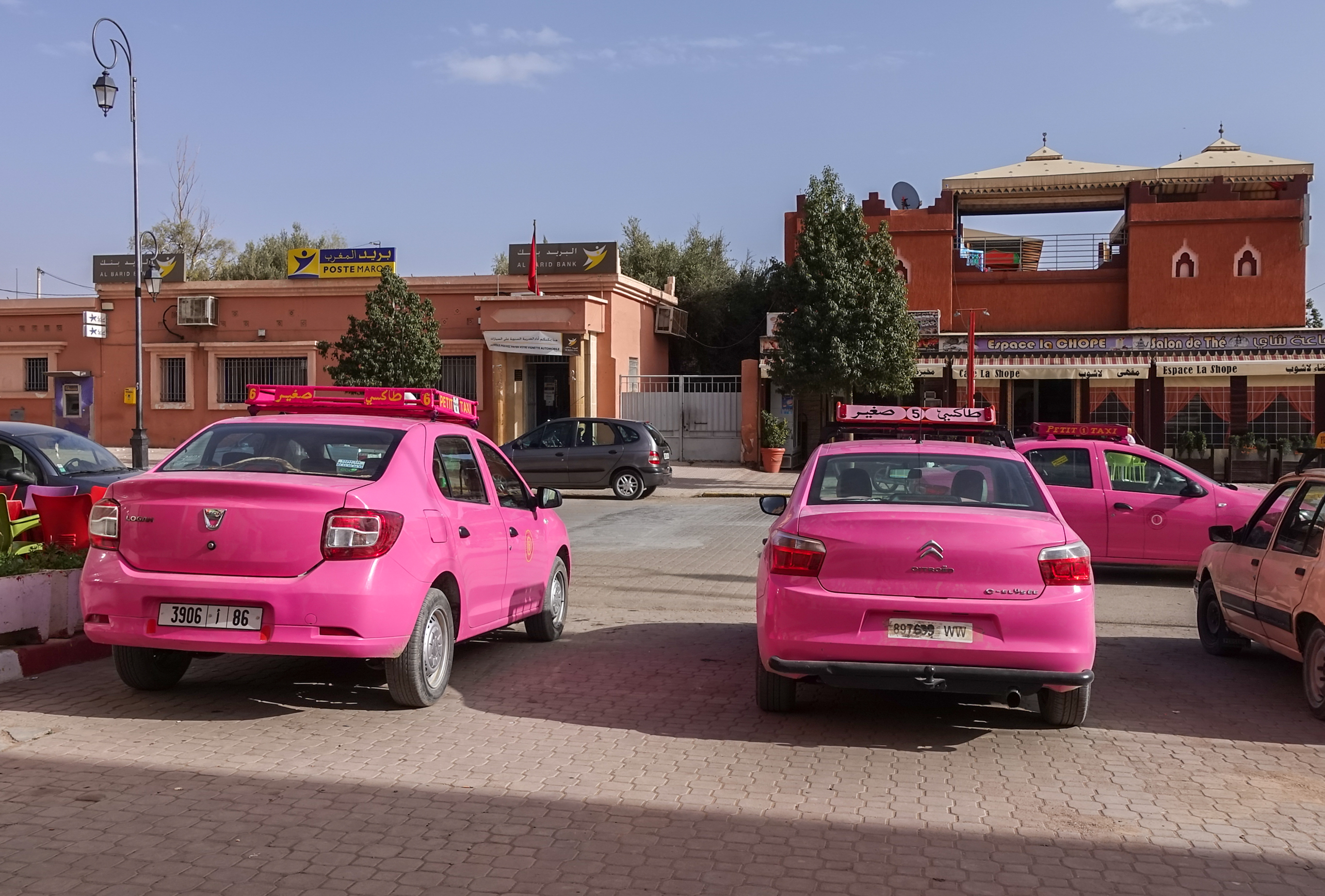
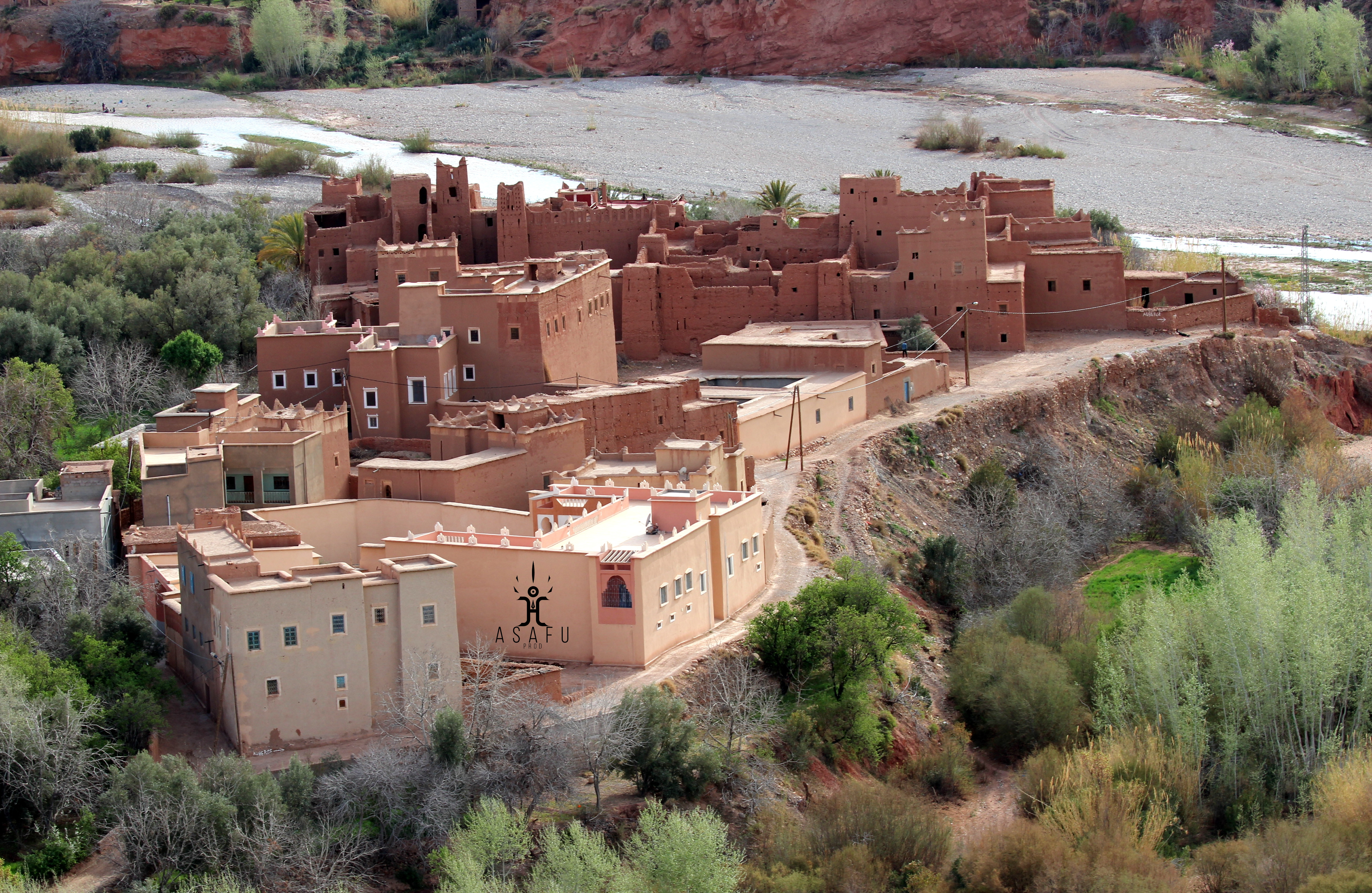
- Nickname: Pink City
- Interactive map of Kalaat M'Gouna
- Country: Morocco
- Region: Drâa-Tafilalet
- Province: Tinghir

Government
  - Mayor: El- Madani Oumellouk

Population (2024)
  - Total: 17,737
- Time zone: UTC+0 (GMT)

Kalaat M'Gouna (Moroccan Arabic: قلعة مݣونة, romanized: qəlʿət mguna) or Tighremt NImgunen (Standard Moroccan Tamazight: ⵜⵉⵖⵔⵎⵜ ⵏ ⵉⵎⴳⵓⵏⴻⵏ) is a city in Tinghir Province, Drâa-Tafilalet, Morocco. According to the 2024 Moroccan census it has a population of 17,737.

This town constitutes an economic and social center for the region, for its very animated nature. Kalaat M'Gouna is most known for the "Roses Festival" which takes place in the city every year in May.

== The City ==
Some of the neighbourhoods in Kalaat M'Gouna are Ait Aissi, R'kon, El'Kelâa El Qadima, Zawiyt n'Aguerd, Ait Baâmrane, Hay Annahda, Ait Boubker, Mirna, Ait Yahya, Taltnamart, and the center's districts. Many Douars surround the city but are not part of the municipality. These villages include Aït Sidi Boubker, Ifri, Zawiyt Elbir, Amdnagh,Ait Yassine, Sarghin, Timskelt, Ait Boukidour Tazzakht, and Tawrirt and Tasswit.

In this city, there are two major days of souk (market): Tuesday, only for livestock trade, and Wednesday for food and other goods.

The main high schools Al Woroud (Roses), which derives its name from the roses of the Valley of Dadés and M'goun, and another high school named Moulay Baâmrane, are downtown.

There is a factory for the distillery of roses, and production of rose water (l'eau de rose) and essential oils, and cosmetic products. One example of distillation units of roses in Kalaat M'Gouna is named sté Florose.

The city is also known for its dancers who perform a dance called "Ahidus", and its beautiful roses, hence its second name "The valley of the roses."

== Roses Festival ==
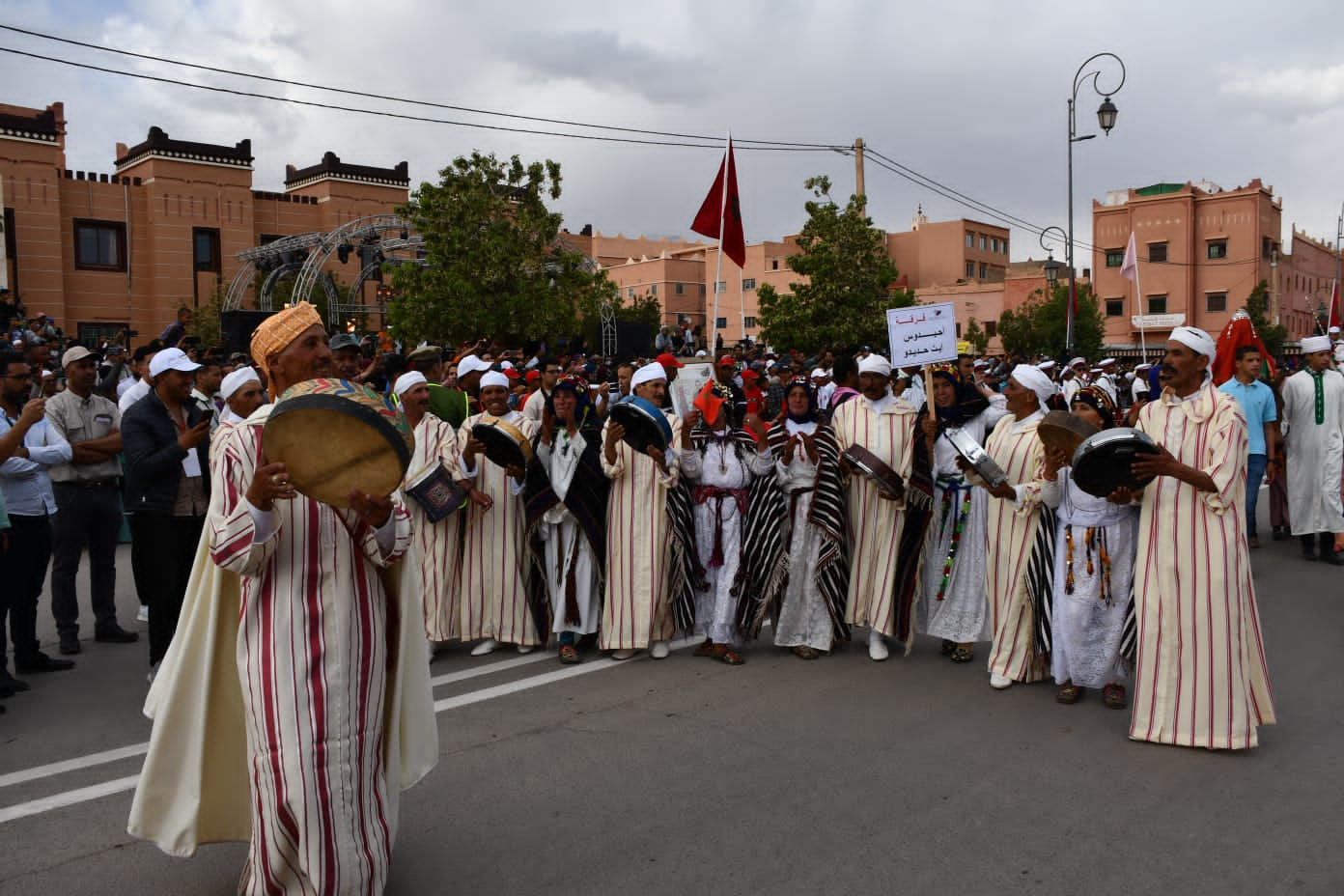
Ahidus procession

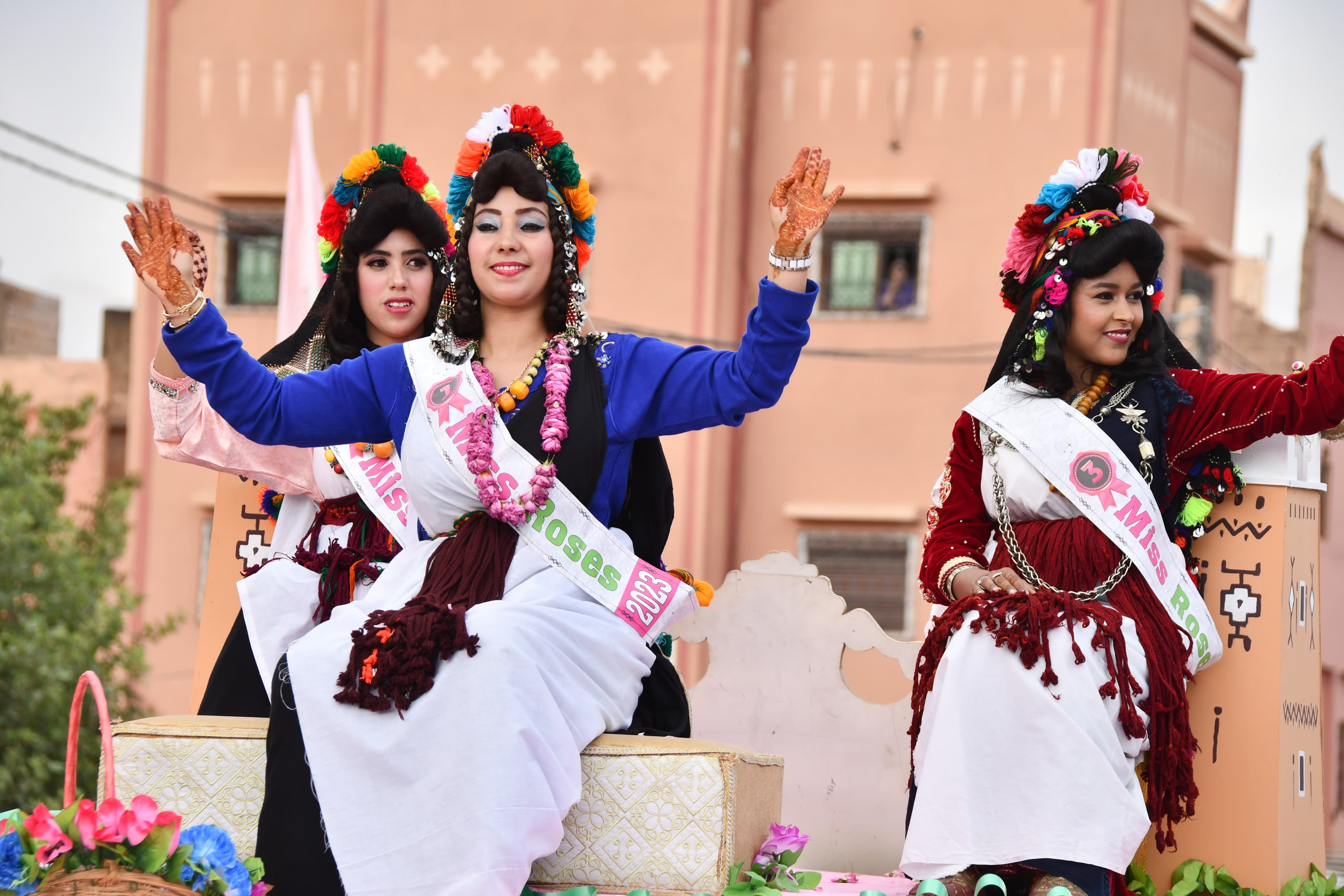
Rose pageant

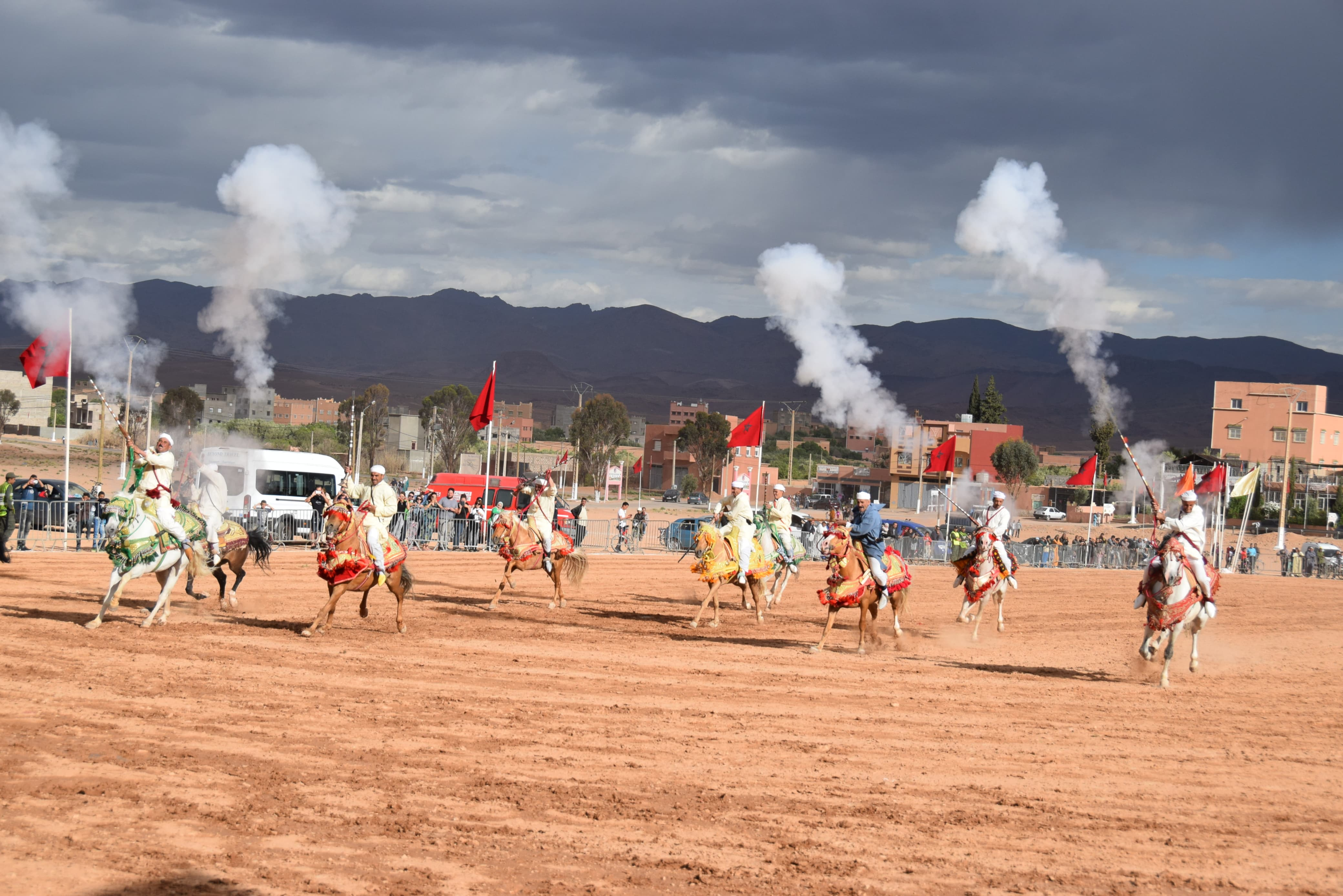
Tafrawt

The Roses Festival takes place in Kalaat M'Gouna every year in May. It lasts 7 days to celebrate the season of roses in Dadès and M'Goun. In 2015, the number of visitors of the festival reached 300,000. During the festival, people from all over the world came to Kalaatname M'Gouna to discover its beauty and its rose products that range from perfume, rose water, oil, to cosmetic products, and also to experience the warmth and the hospitality of its generous local people.

The festival is also an opportunity for the visitors to explore handicrafts and agricultural products of the region.

== Other sights ==
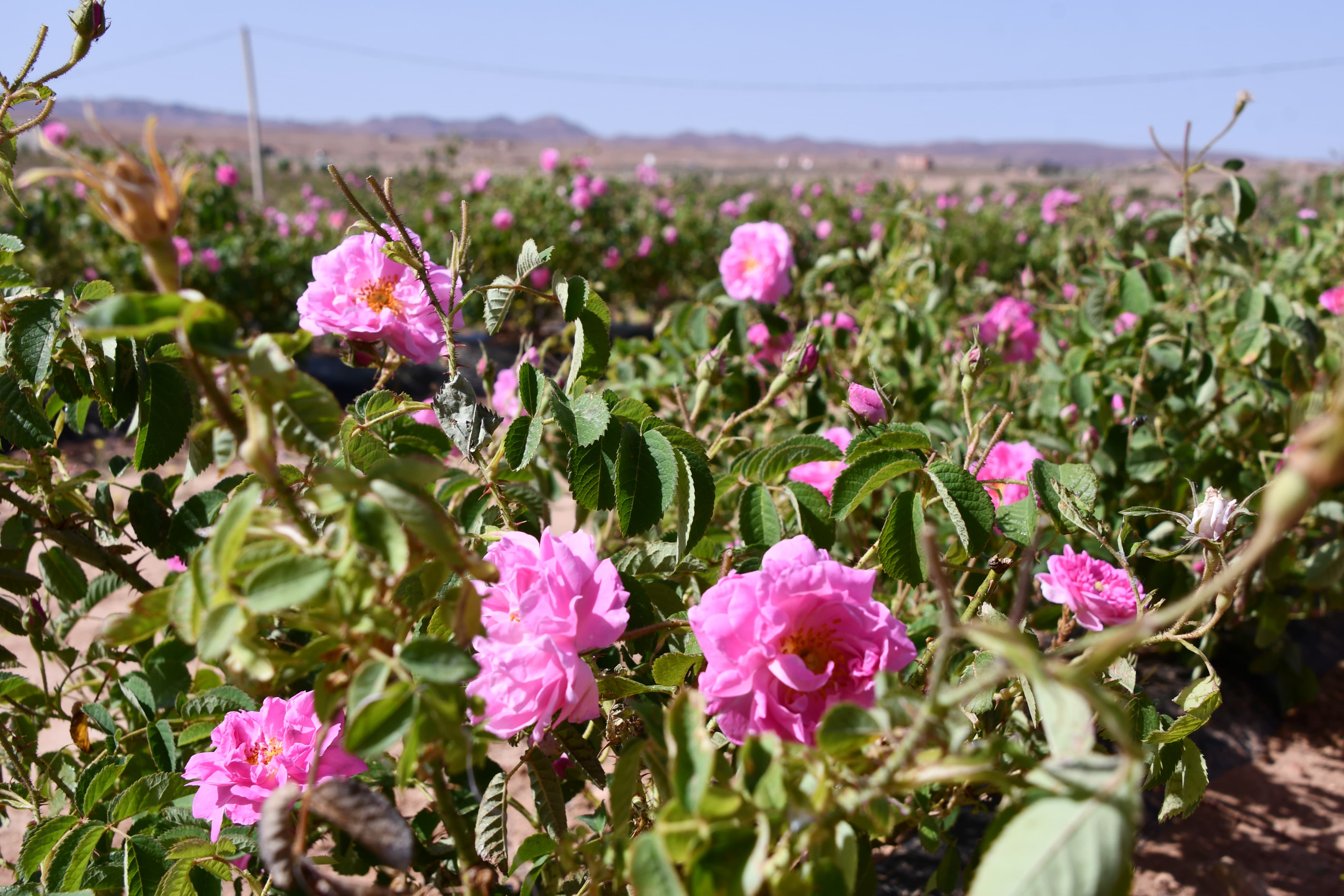
The valley is famous for its roses.

- The old bridge (vieux pont): When the new bridge was built for a highway, local women began to use the old one for drying carpets that they washed in the river, turning it into picturesque place.
