= Abdelaziz Barrada =

Footballer (1989–2024)

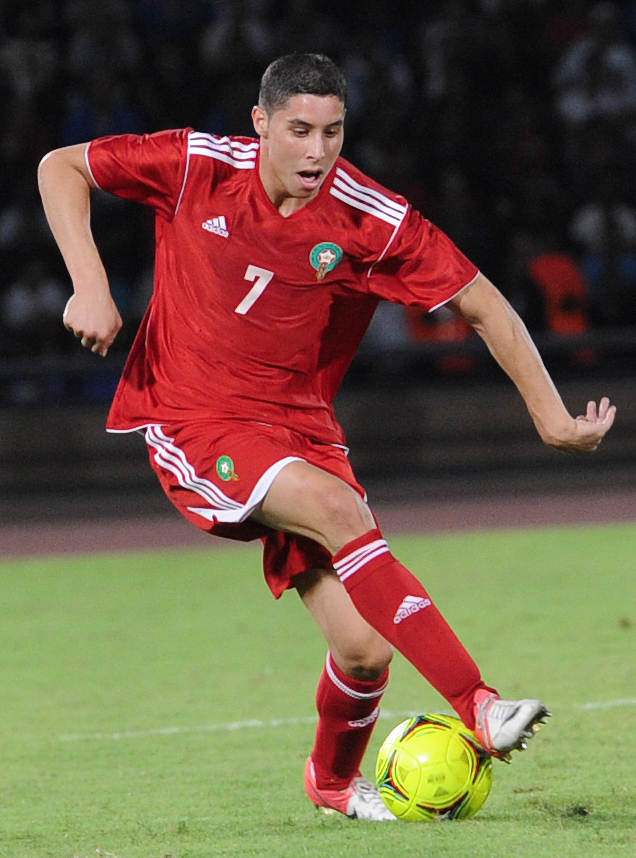
- Barrada playing for Morocco in 2012

Personal information
- Date of birth: 19 June 1989
- Place of birth: Provins, France
- Date of death: 24 October 2024 (aged 35)
- Place of death: Paris, France
- Height: 1.79 m (5 ft 10 in)
- Position: Midfielder

Youth career
- Paris FC
- Sénart-Moissy

Senior career*
Years	Team	Apps	(Gls)
2006–2007	Sénart-Moissy	11	(3)
2007–2010	Paris Saint-Germain B	43	(2)
2010–2011	Getafe B	32	(4)
2011–2013	Getafe	64	(8)
2013–2014	Al Jazira	22	(10)
2014–2016	Marseille	33	(2)
2016–2018	Al Nasr	33	(9)
2018–2019	Antalyaspor	5	(0)
2019	→ Gimnàstic (loan)	4	(0)
2019–2020	Al Shahania	5	(0)
2020–2021	Lusitanos Saint-Maur	0	(0)
Total		252	(38)

International career
2011–2012	Morocco U23	11	(4)
2012–2015	Morocco	26	(4)
- * Club domestic league appearances and goals

Abdelaziz Barrada (Arabic: عبد العزيز برادة; 19 June 1989 – 24 October 2024), sometimes known as Abdel, was a professional footballer who played as a midfielder. Born in France, he represented Morocco at international level.

He played in Spain's La Liga for Getafe and France's Ligue 1 for Marseille, in addition to spells in top-flight football in the United Arab Emirates, Turkey and Qatar. He earned 26 caps for Morocco, and was chosen for the 2012 Olympic football tournament and the 2013 Africa Cup of Nations.

== Club career ==
=== Early career ===
Barrada was born on 19 June 1989 in Provins, France. He played in the youth teams of Paris FC before joining Sénart-Moissy. He spent three years with Paris Saint-Germain's reserves, and in 2007 he was the inaugural winner of the Titi d'Or for the club's best youth player.

=== Getafe ===
Barrada moved to Spain in 2010 and joined Getafe, initially being assigned to the reserves which were playing for the first time ever in Segunda División B. On 14 March 2011, he signed his first professional contract with the Madrid outskirts club.

On 28 August 2011, Barrada made his La Liga debut with Getafe, starting and playing 60 minutes in a 1–1 home draw against Levante. He was immediately propelled into manager Luís García's starting XI. He scored his first goal for Getafe's main squad on 6 November, helping the hosts – who played more than 60 minutes with ten players – to a 3–2 home win against Atlético Madrid. In the following month, on the 17th, he netted twice in a 2–1 success at Mallorca.

Barrada scored four goals in 32 matches in both of his seasons with the team, helping it to consecutive midtable positions (11th and tenth).

=== Al Jazira and Marseille ===
On 6 July 2013, Barrada joined UAE Pro League side Al Jazira, signing a four-year contract. The following summer, he agreed to a four-year deal with Marseille for a reported €4.5 million.

In only his second appearance in Ligue 1, Barrada scored his first goal in the competition, coming on as an 87th-minute substitute in the home fixture against Nice and scoring for a 4–0 victory. His second arrived early into the 2015–16 season, as he contributed to a 6–0 demolition of Troyes also at the Stade Vélodrome.

=== Later career ===
In July 2016, Barrada returned to the UAE, signing for Al-Nasr of Dubai. He signed a three-year deal and Marseille received €2 million for the player who had contributed six assists in his final season.

Barrada signed a two-year deal with Antalyaspor of the Turkish Süper Lig in August 2018. The following January, he returned to Spain for the first time in over five years, being loaned to Gimnàstic Tarragona for the remainder of the Segunda División season. At the start of April, the Catalan club cancelled his contract after 145 minutes of play and concerns over his professionalism; manager Enrique Martín said "the Barrada I knew is not here".

In September 2019, Barrada went back to the Arabian Peninsula, signing a one-year deal at Al Shahaniya in the Qatar Stars League. Four months later he returned to his native Île-de-France, signing for Lusitanos Saint-Maur in the Championnat National 2, the fourth tier of French football.

Barrada announced his retirement in mid-2021. He then became a consultant for RMC Sport and beIN Sports.

== International career ==
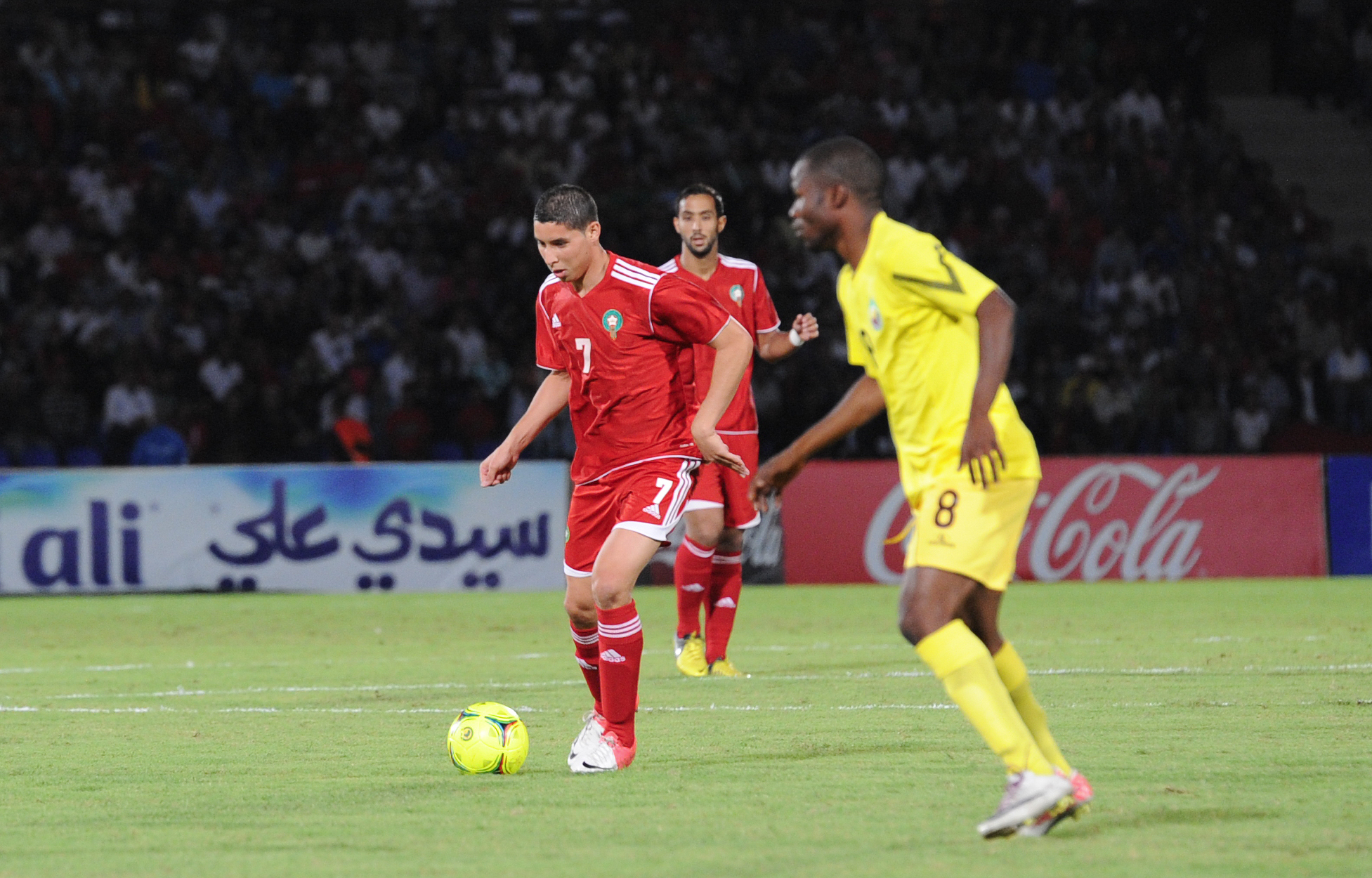
Barrada on the ball against Mozambique in October 2012

Barrada earned his first cap for Morocco on 29 February 2012, playing 86 minutes in a 2–0 friendly win over Burkina Faso. Also that year, he was part of the under-23 squad at the Summer Olympic Games, scoring in a 2–2 draw against Honduras in an eventual group stage exit.

Barrada started all three of Morocco's games at the 2013 Africa Cup of Nations in South Africa, as the Atlas Lions again did not advance. In the second game, he assisted the late equaliser by Youssef El-Arabi in a 1–1 draw with Cape Verde.

== Death ==
Barrada died of a heart attack in France on 24 October 2024, at the age of 35. His funeral took place at his birthplace of Provins in France, followed by burial in his family's village of Douar Aït Abdallah in Souk Lakhmis Dades in Tinghir Province, Morocco.

== Career statistics ==
=== Club ===
Appearances and goals by club, season and competition
Club	Season	League			National cup		League cup		Continental		Other		Total	
Club	Season	Division	Apps	Goals	Apps	Goals	Apps	Goals	Apps	Goals	Apps	Goals	Apps	Goals
Getafe B	2009–10	Segunda División B	30	4	—		—		—		—		30	4
Getafe B	2010–11	Segunda División B	2	0	—		—		—		—		2	0
Getafe B	Total		32	4	—		—		—		—		32	4
Getafe	2011–12	La Liga	32	4	1	0	—		—		—		33	4
Getafe	2012–13	La Liga	32	4	1	0	—		—		—		33	4
Getafe	Total		64	8	2	0	—		—		—		66	8
Al Jazira	2013–14	UAE Pro League	22	10	1	0	4	1	8	4	—		35	15
Marseille	2014–15	Ligue 1	9	1	0	0	1	0	—		—		10	1
Marseille	2015–16	Ligue 1	24	1	5	1	0	0	6	1	—		35	3
Marseille	Total		33	2	5	1	1	0	6	1	—		45	4
Al-Nasr	2016–17	UAE Pro League	20	6	3	1	4	2	2	0	—		29	9
Al-Nasr	2017–18	UAE Pro League	13	3	0	0	3	0	—		—		16	3
Al-Nasr	Total		33	9	3	1	7	2	2	0	—		45	12
Antalyaspor	2018–19	Süper Lig	5	0	4	3	—		—		—		9	3
Gimnàstic (loan)	2018–19	Segunda División	4	0	—		—		—		—		4	0
Al Shahaniya	2019–20	Qatar Stars League	5	0	0	0	4	0	—		—		9	0
Career total			244	44	23	7	16	3	24	8	0	0	307	62

=== International ===
Appearances and goals by national team and year
National team	Year	Apps	Goals
Morocco
Morocco	2012	8	1
Morocco	2013	9	2
Morocco	2014	6	1
Morocco	2015	3	0
Total		26	4

Scores and results list Morocco's goal tally first, score column indicates score after each Barrada goal.

List of international goals scored by Abdelaziz Barrada
No.	Date	Venue	Opponent	Score	Result	Competition	Reference
1	13 October 2012	Marrakesh Stadium, Marrakesh, Morocco	Mozambique	1–0	4–0	2013 Africa Cup of Nations qualification	
2	15 June 2013	Marrakesh Stadium, Marrakesh, Morocco	Gambia	1–0	2–0	2014 World Cup qualification	
3	14 August 2013	Ibn Batouta Stadium, Tangier, Morocco	Burkina Faso	1–2	1–2	Friendly	
4	7 September 2014	Marrakesh Stadium, Marrakesh, Morocco	Libya	2–0	3–0	Friendly	

== Honours ==
Morocco U23

- U-23 Africa Cup of Nations runner-up: 2011

Individual

- U-23 Africa Cup of Nations top scorer: 2011
- U-23 Africa Cup of Nations Team of the Tournament: 2011
