= Boumalne Dades =

Boumalne Dades بومالن دادس ⴱⵓⵎⴰⵍ ⵏ ⴷⴰⴷⵙ
- City
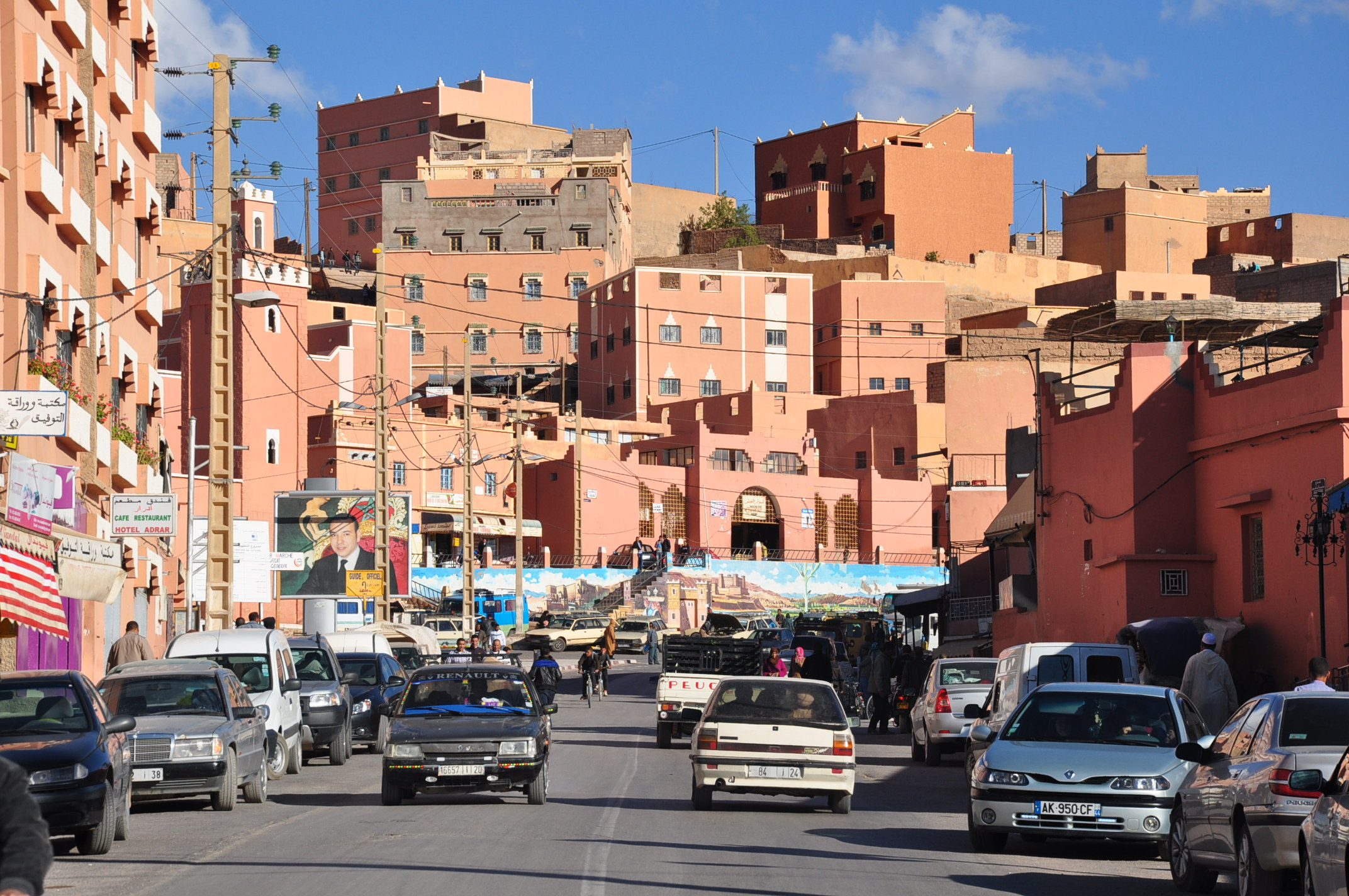
- Interactive map of Boumalne Dades
- Coordinates: 31°22′26″N 5°59′44″W
- Country: Morocco
- Region: Drâa-Tafilalet
- Province: Tinghir
- Elevation: 5,125 ft (1,562 m)

Population (2014)
  - Total: 12,328
- Time zone: UTC+0 (WET)
  - Summer (DST): UTC+1 (WEST)

Boumalne Dades (Arabic: بومالن دادس) is a city in Tinghir Province, Drâa-Tafilalet, Morocco. According to the 2014 census, it had a population of 12,328.

Located at the edge of a desert plateau, at the outlet of the upper Dadès Valley (more than 1500 m high), Boumalne Dades is originated from an old way of transhumance, controlled by the Aït Atta Tribe of Jbel Saghro. Most of its residents, like those of the Dades Valley, are from the Ait Atta tribe. The Ait Atta tribe also resides along the Dades River, extending as far as Tazzakht.

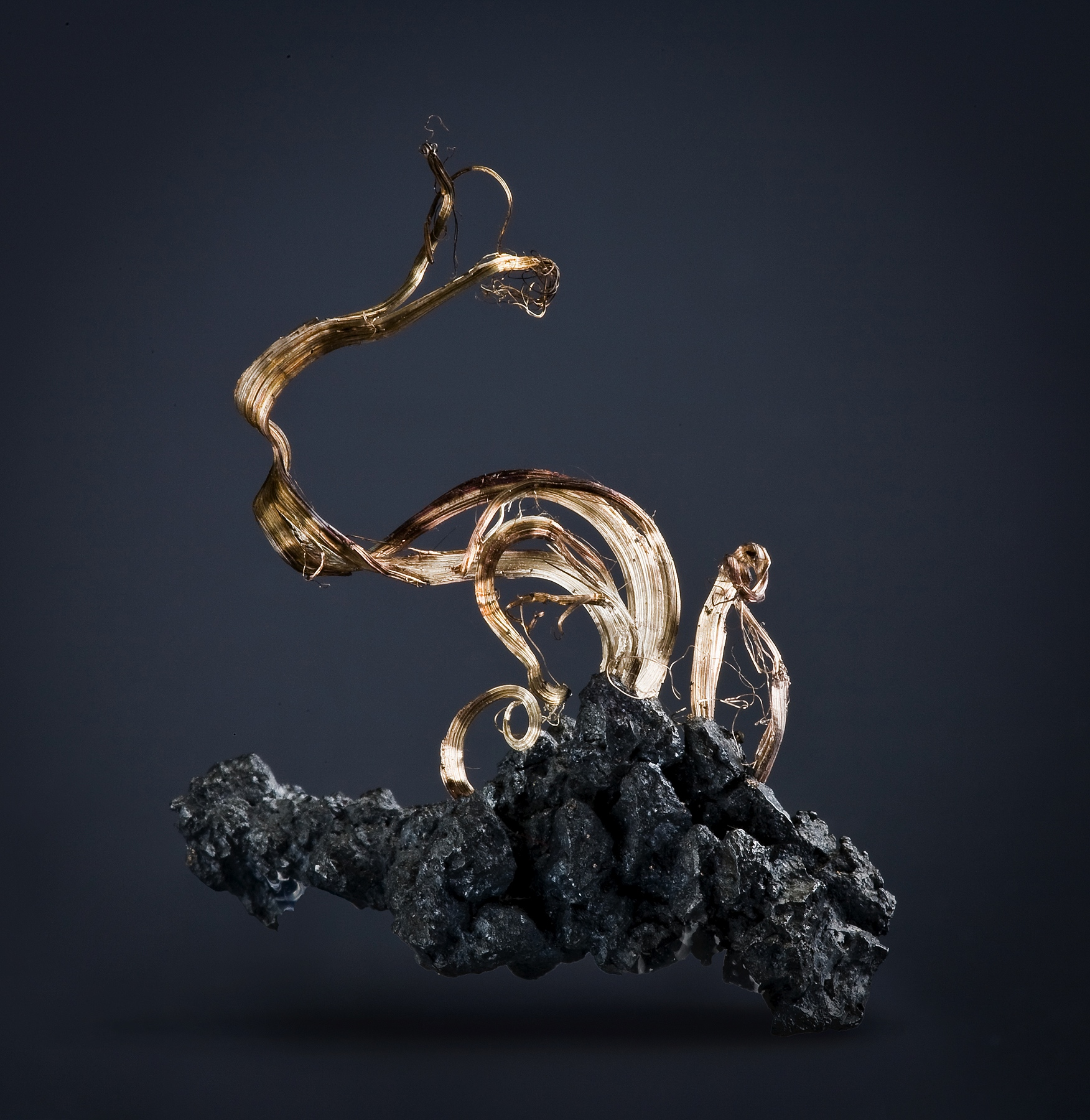
Silver on Acanthite from the Imiter mine, about 20 km east of Boumalne-Dadès.
