= Imider =

- commune
- Location within Morocco
- Coordinates: 31°21′0″N 5°43′30″W
- Country: Morocco
- Region: Drâa-Tafilalet
- Province: Tinghir

Population (2004)
  - Total: 3,936
- Time zone: UTC+0 (GMT)

Imider (Imiter) is a commune in the Tinghir Province of the Drâa-Tafilalet administrative region of Morocco. At the time of the 2004 census, the commune had a total population of 3,936 people living in 507 households.

Imider is known for a big silver mine (the seventh biggest producer of silver in the world, and the biggest mine in Africa), exploited by SMI (Société Métallurgique d'Imiter), of which the Moroccan Royal family is the main shareholder. In 2012, the village organised sit-ins to reclaim a part of the wealth extracted from the region by the mine.
