= Ait Sedrate Sahl Charkia =

- commune
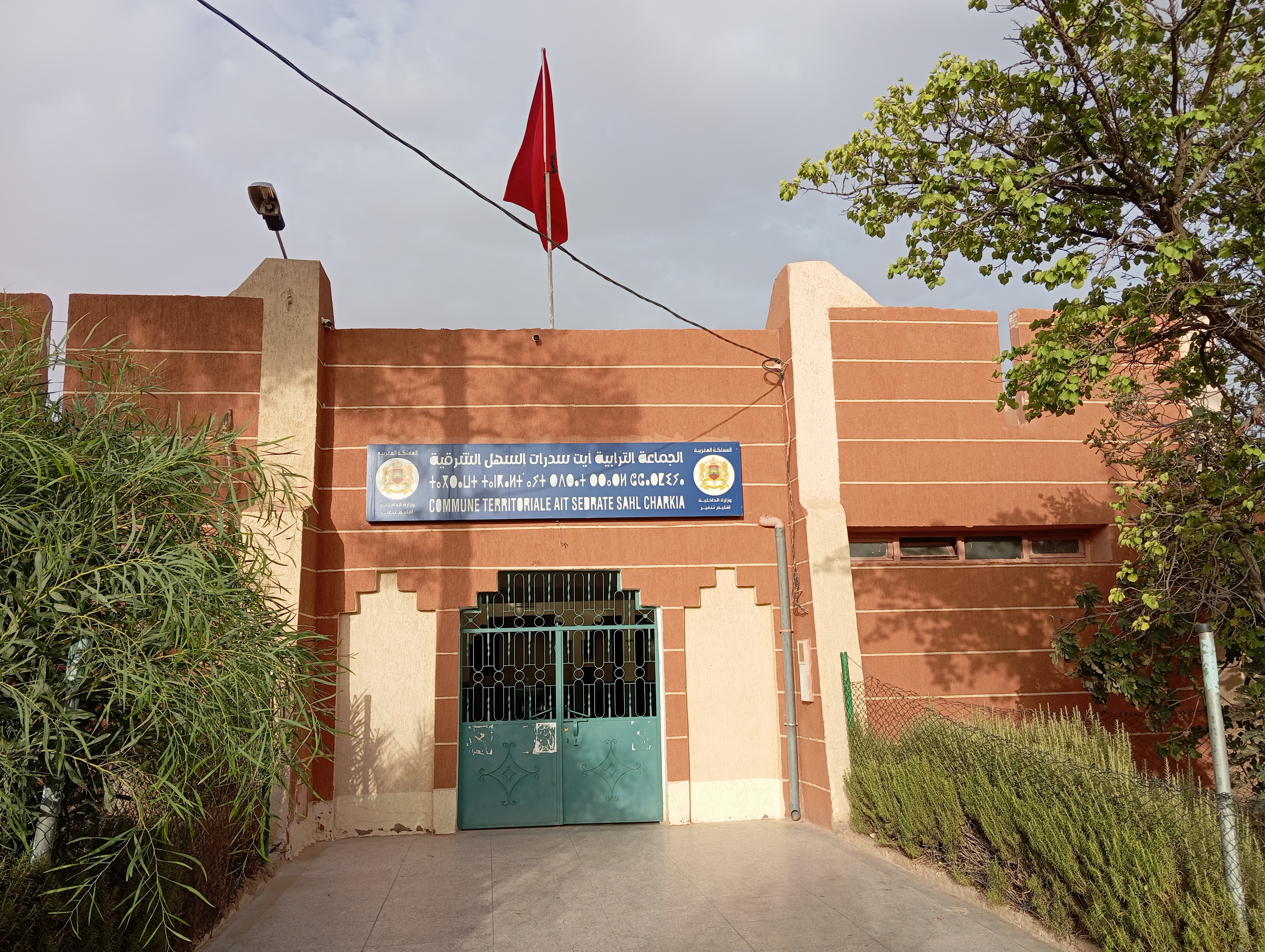

- Location within Morocco
- Coordinates: 31°14′57″N 6°05′18″W
- Country: Morocco
- Region: Drâa-Tafilalet
- Province: Tinghir

Population (2004)
  - Total: 13,082
- Time zone: UTC+0 (GMT)

Ait Sedrate Sahl Charkia is a rural commune in the Tinghir Province of the Drâa-Tafilalet administrative region of Morocco. (Note: Formerly in Ouarzazate Province of the Souss-Massa-Drâa region, in the old administrative system of Morocco (until 2015)) At the time of the 2004 census, the commune had a total population of 13082 people living in 1800 households.
