= Ighil N'Oumgoun =

Coordinates: 31.5000°N 6.2400°W

- commune
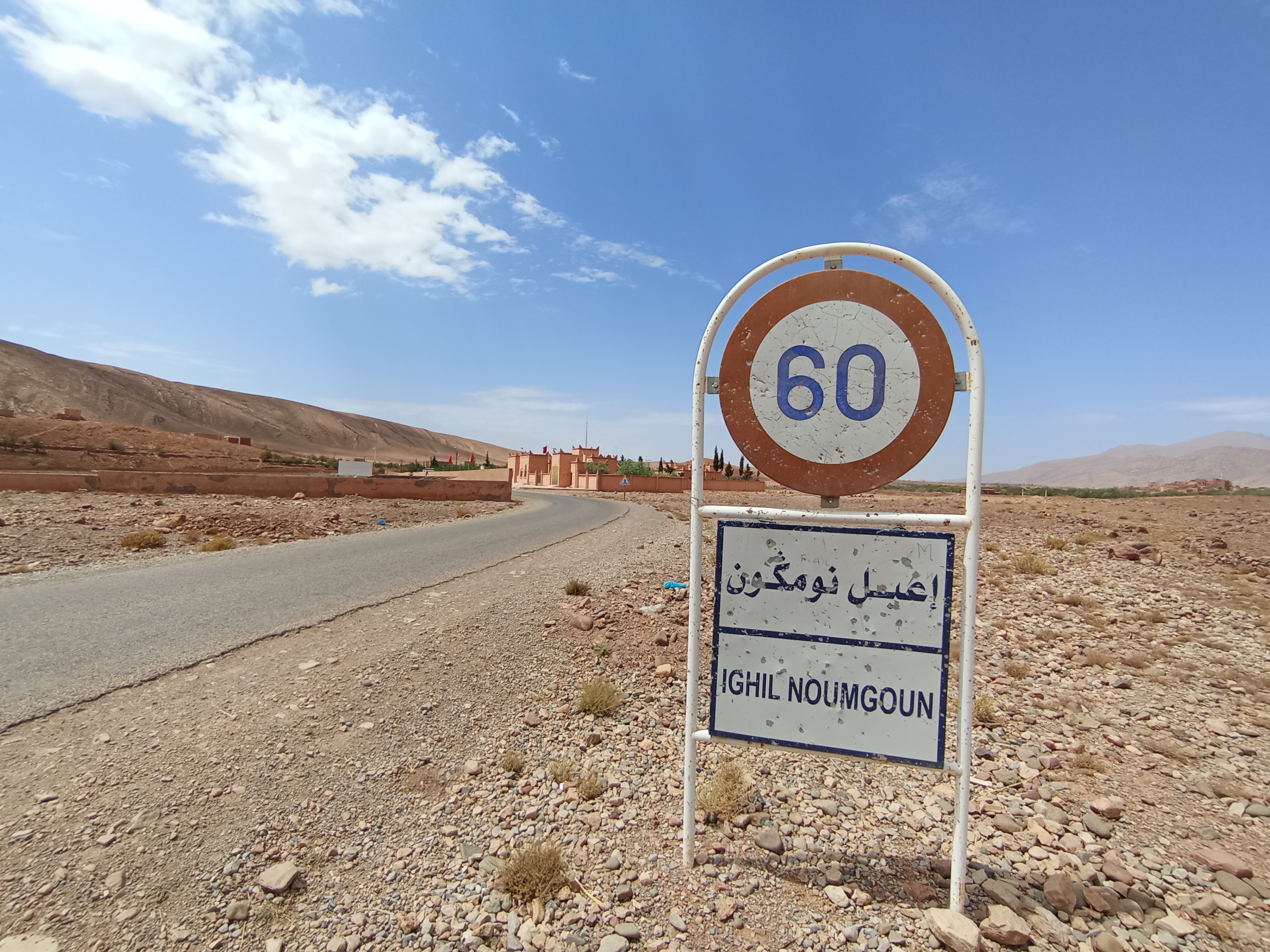
- Interactive map of Ighil N'Oumgoun
- Country: Morocco
- Region: Drâa-Tafilalet
- Province: Tinghir

Population (2004)
  - Total: 19,182
- Time zone: UTC+0 (GMT)

Ighil N'Oumgoun is a commune in the Tinghir Province of the Drâa-Tafilalet administrative region of Morocco. At the time of the 2004 census, the commune had a total population of 19182 people living in 2509 households.
