= M'Semrir =

M'Semrir امسمرير
- commune
- Location within Morocco
- Coordinates: 31°42′10″N 5°48′45″W
- Country: Morocco
- Region: Drâa-Tafilalet
- Province: Tinghir

Population (2004)
  - Total: 8,107
- Time zone: UTC+0 (GMT)

M'Semrir (Arabic: امسمرير) is a commune in Tinghir Province of the Drâa-Tafilalet administrative region of Morocco. At the time of the 2004 census, the commune had a total population of 8107 people living in 1097 households.
