= Movement on the Road '96 =

- Amussu xf Ubrid n 96
- Date: August 2011 – 17 September 2019
- Location: Imider, Tinghir Province, Morocco
- Result: Protest camp dismantled in September 2019

Movement on the Road '96 (Amazigh: Amussu xf Ubrid n 96; abbreviated MOR96) was a protest camp on Mount Alebban in the rural commune of Imider, in Tinghir Province, southeastern Morocco that lasted from August 2011 to September 2019. Its participants protested against the nearby Imiter silver mine, campaigning over access to water, collective land rights, and employment for local residents. Protesters shut a valve on a pipeline serving the Imiter silver mine.

== See also ==
- 2011–2012 Moroccan protests
- February 20 Movement
- Managem
