= Ait El Farsi =

- commune
- Location within Morocco
- Coordinates: 31°21′N 5°18′W
- Country: Morocco
- Region: Drâa-Tafilalet
- Province: Tinghir

Area
  - Total: 209 km^{2} (81 sq mi)
- Elevation: 1,144 m (3,753 ft)

Population (2014)
  - Total: 4,754
- Time zone: UTC+0 (GMT)
- Code postal AIT EL FARSI: 45672

Ait El Farsi is a commune in Tinghir Province of the Drâa-Tafilalet administrative region of Morocco. At the time of the 2014 census, the commune had a total population of 4754 people living in 751 households.
