= Tilmi =

Commune in Morocco

Coordinates: 31.8189°N 5.7718°W

- commune
- Interactive map of Tilmi
- Country: Morocco
- Region: Drâa-Tafilalet
- Province: Tinghir

Population (2004)
  - Total: 10,445
- Time zone: UTC+0 (GMT)

Tilmi is a commune in the Tinghir Province of the Drâa-Tafilalet administrative region of Morocco. At the time of the 2004 census, the commune had a total population of 10,445 people living in 1,588 households.
