= Ait Ouassif =

- commune
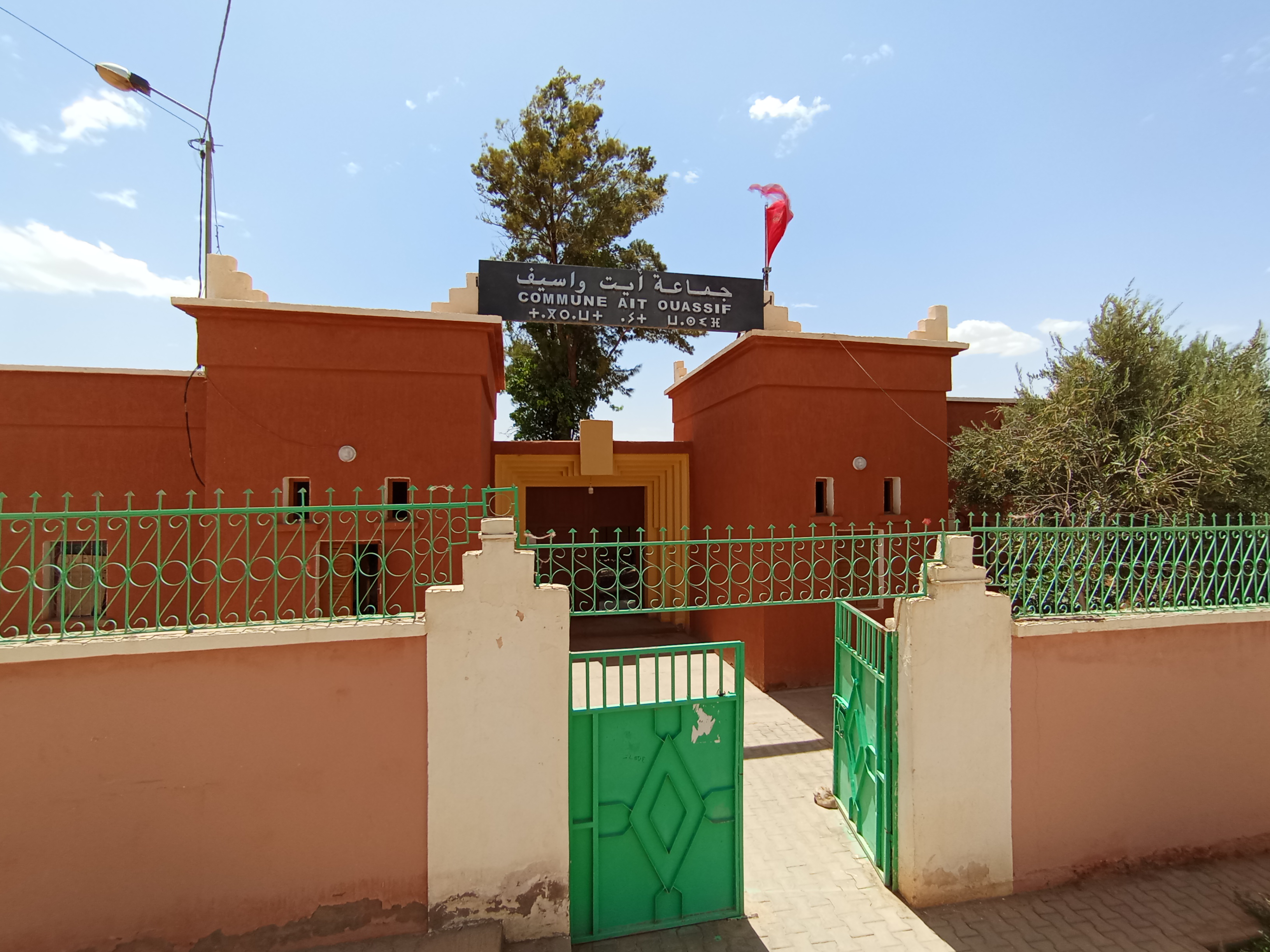

- Location within Morocco
- Coordinates: 31°14′01″N 6°08′52″W
- Country: Morocco
- Region: Drâa-Tafilalet
- Province: Tinghir

Population (2004)
  - Total: 7,591
- Time zone: UTC+0 (GMT)

Ait Ouassif is a commune in the Tinghir Province of the Drâa-Tafilalet administrative region of Morocco (formerly in Ouarzazate Province of the Souss-Massa-Drâa administrative region). At the time of the 2004 census, the commune had a total population of 7591 people living in 855 households.
