= Alnif =

Alnif ⴰⵍⵏⵉⴼ (Standard Moroccan Tamazight) ألنيف (Arabic)
- Town
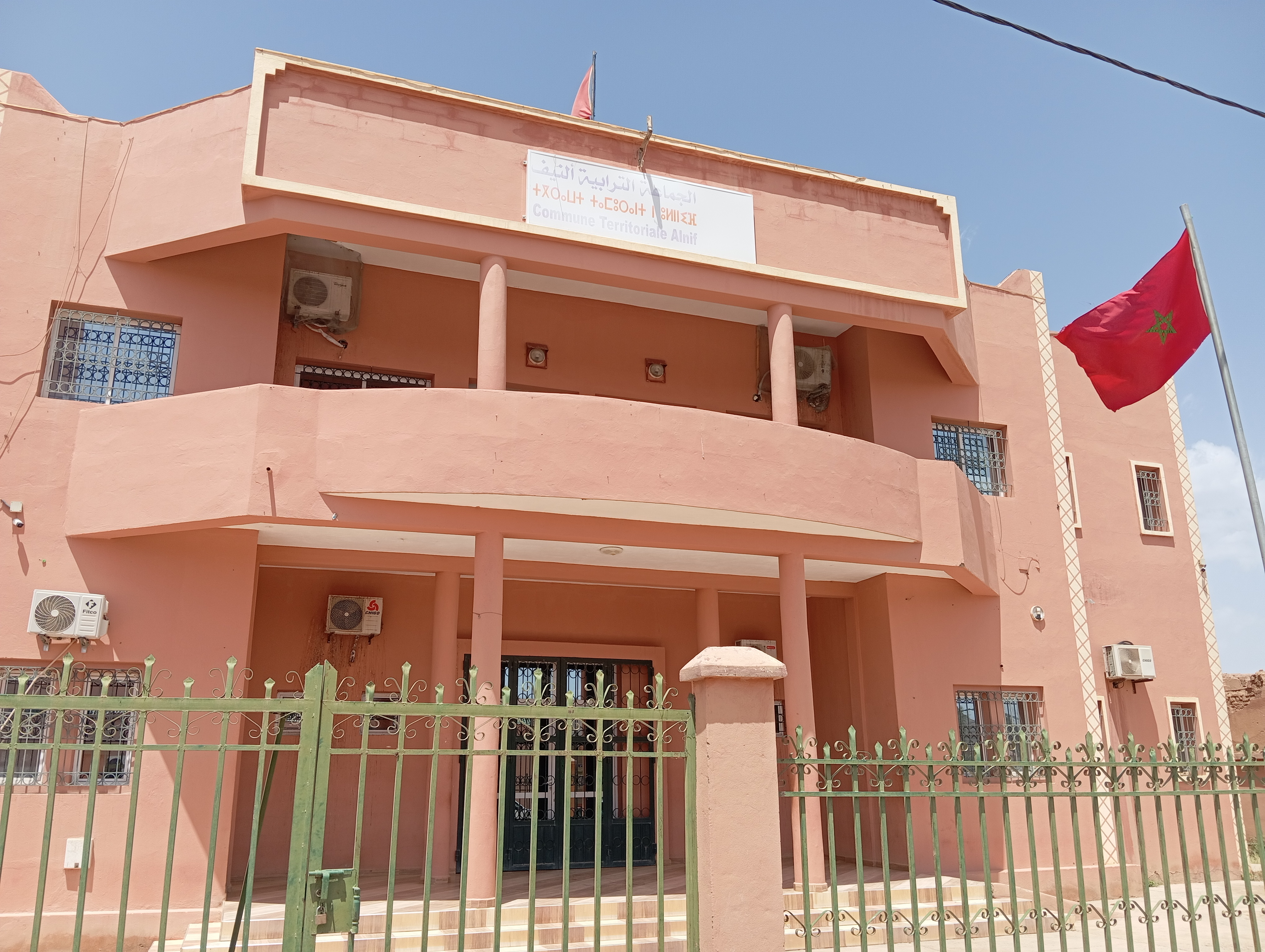
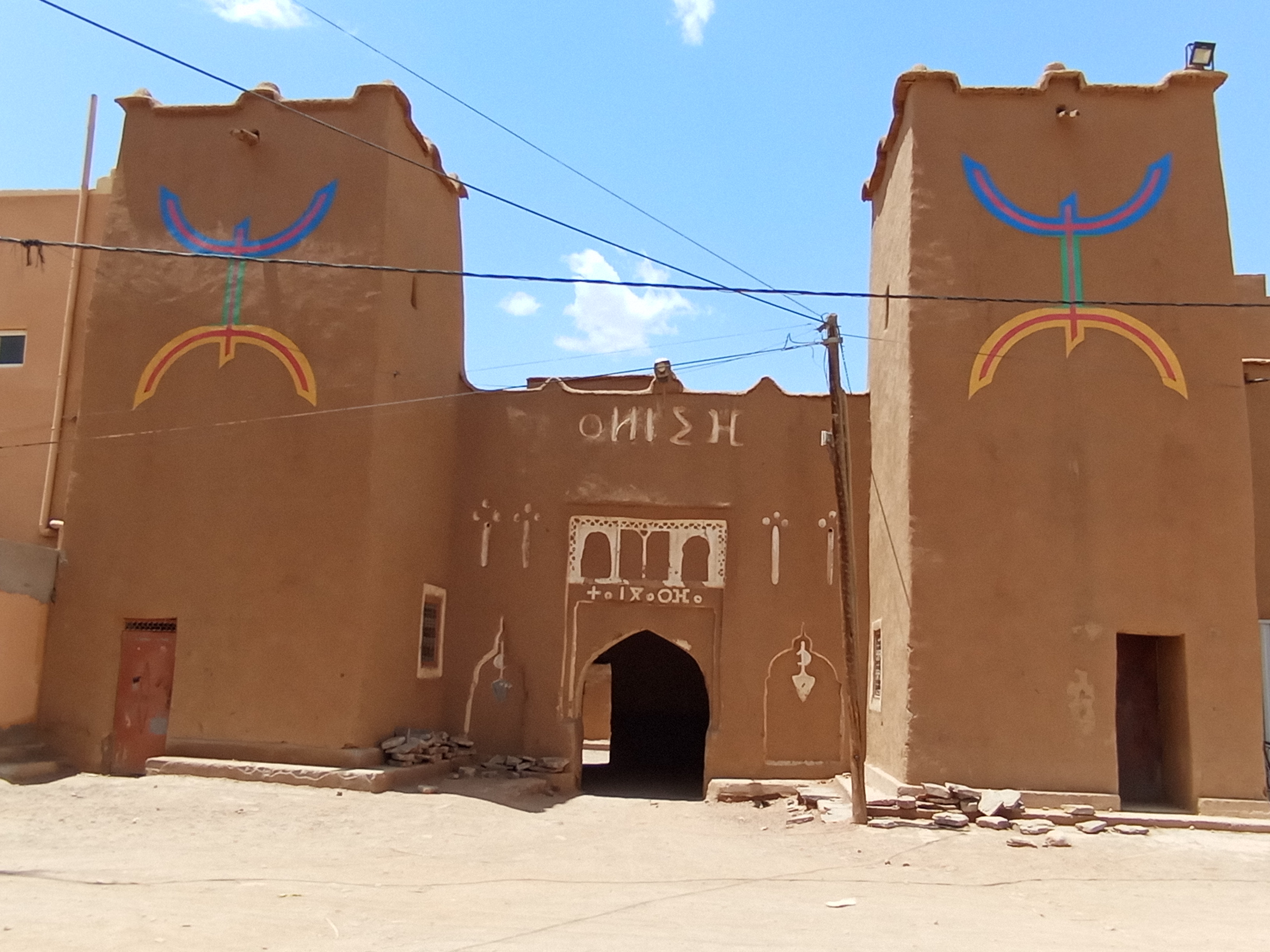
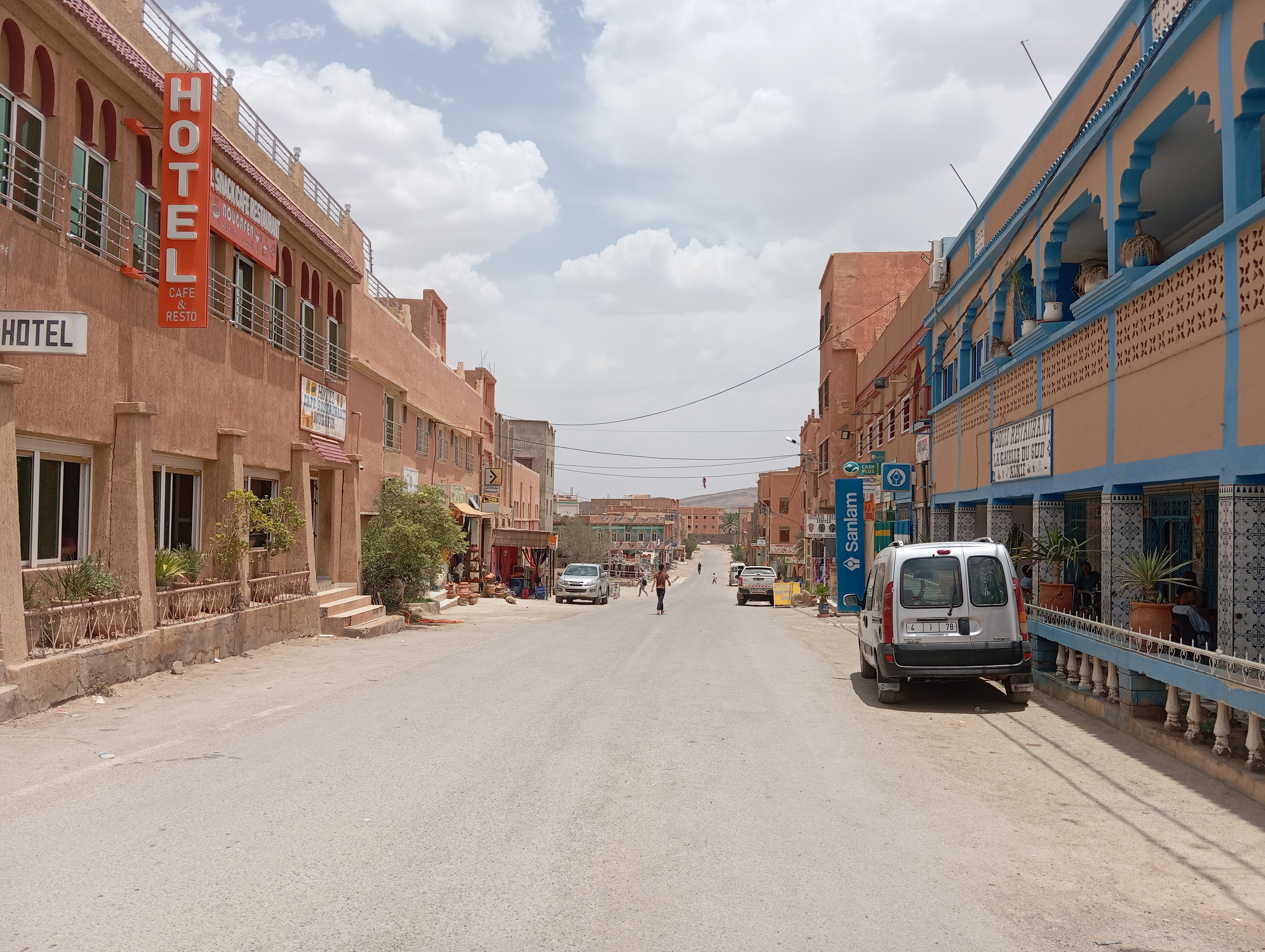
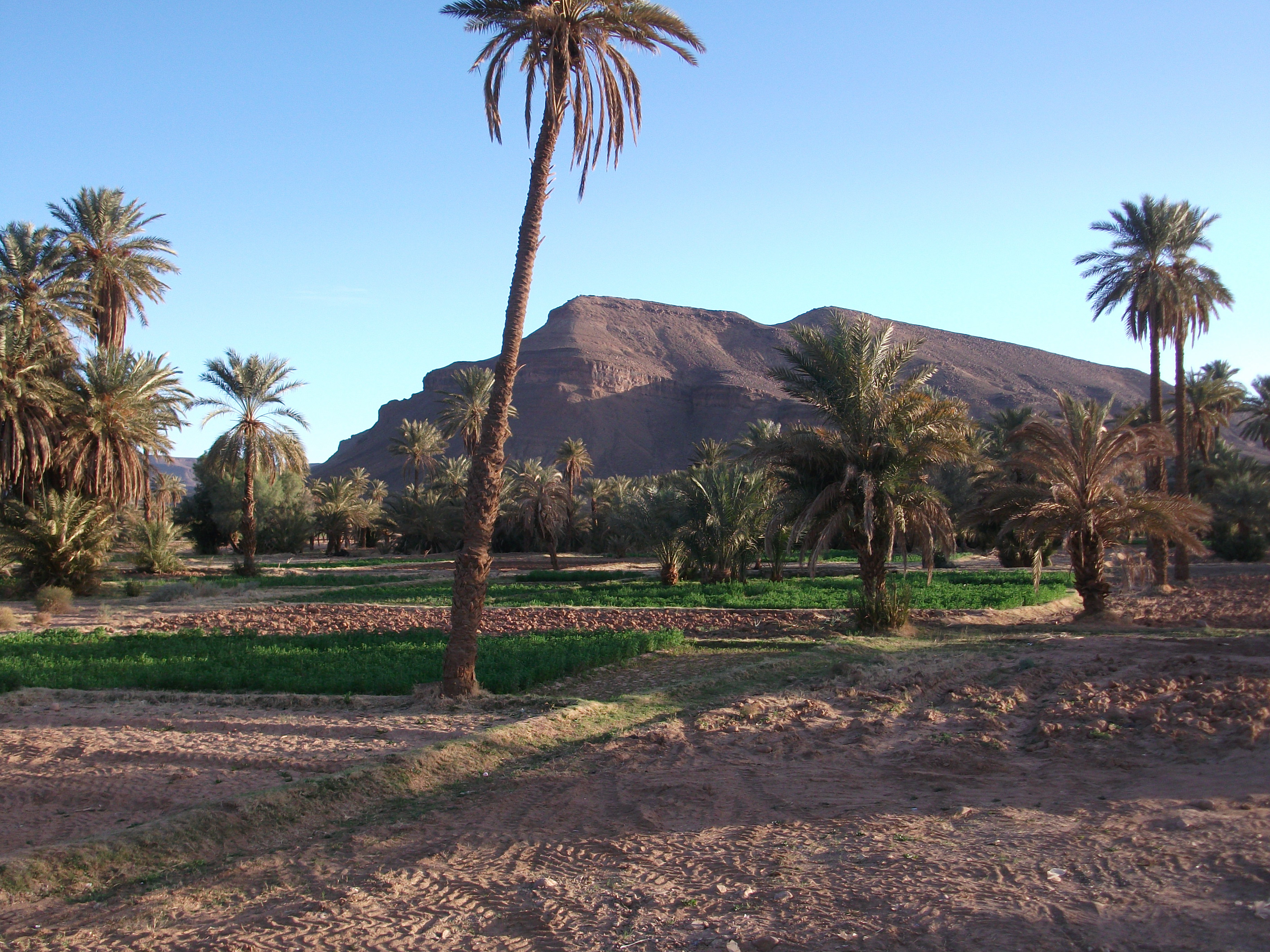
- Interactive map of Alnif
- Coordinates: 31°07′N 5°10′W
- Country: Morocco
- Region: Drâa-Tafilalet
- Province: Tinghir Province

Population (2024)
  - Total: 5,457
- Time zone: UTC+0 (GMT)

Alnif (Note: Standard Moroccan Tamazight: ⴰⵍⵏⵉⴼ; Arabic: ألنيف) is a town in Tinghir Province, Drâa-Tafilalet, located in the southeastern region of Morocco 880 meters above sea. The town has a population of 5,457 according to a 2024 census. It lies on the N12 highway, connecting Tinejdad and Taouz.

== Weather ==
Alnif experiences arid summers and dry winters. Temperature varies from 39 °F (4 °C) to 104 °F (40 °C).

== Notable people ==
- Abdeslam Ouaddou - Former international footballer
