= Ouaklim =

Coordinates: 31°27′N 5°33′W

- Ouaklim
- Interactive map of Ouaklim
- Country: Morocco
- Region: Drâa-Tafilalet
- Province: Tinghir

Population (2004)
  - Total: 8,902
- Time zone: UTC+0 (GMT)

Ouaklim is a commune in the Tinghir Province of the Drâa-Tafilalet administrative region of Morocco. At the 2004 Moroccan census, it has a population of 8,902 living in 1,249 households.
