= Ait Youl =

Coordinates: 31°25′N 6°00′W

- commune
- Interactive map of Ait Youl
- Country: Morocco
- Region: Drâa-Tafilalet
- Province: Tinghir

Population (2004)
  - Total: 4,466
- Time zone: UTC+0 (GMT)

Ait Youl is a commune in the Tinghir Province of the Drâa-Tafilalet administrative region of Morocco. (Note: Formerly in Ouarzazate Province of the Souss-Massa-Drâa region, in the old administrative system of Morocco (until 2015)) At the time of the 2004 census, the commune had a total population of 4466 people living in 616 households.
