= Toudgha El Oulia =

- commune
- Location within Morocco
- Country: Morocco
- Region: Drâa-Tafilalet
- Province: Tinghir

Population (2004)
  - Total: 5,665
- Time zone: UTC+0 (GMT)

Toudgha El Oulia is a commune in the Tinghir Province of the Drâa-Tafilalet administrative region of Morocco. At the time of the 2004 census, the commune had a total population of 5665 people living in 939 households.
