= Ait Sedrate Jbel El Soufla =

- commune
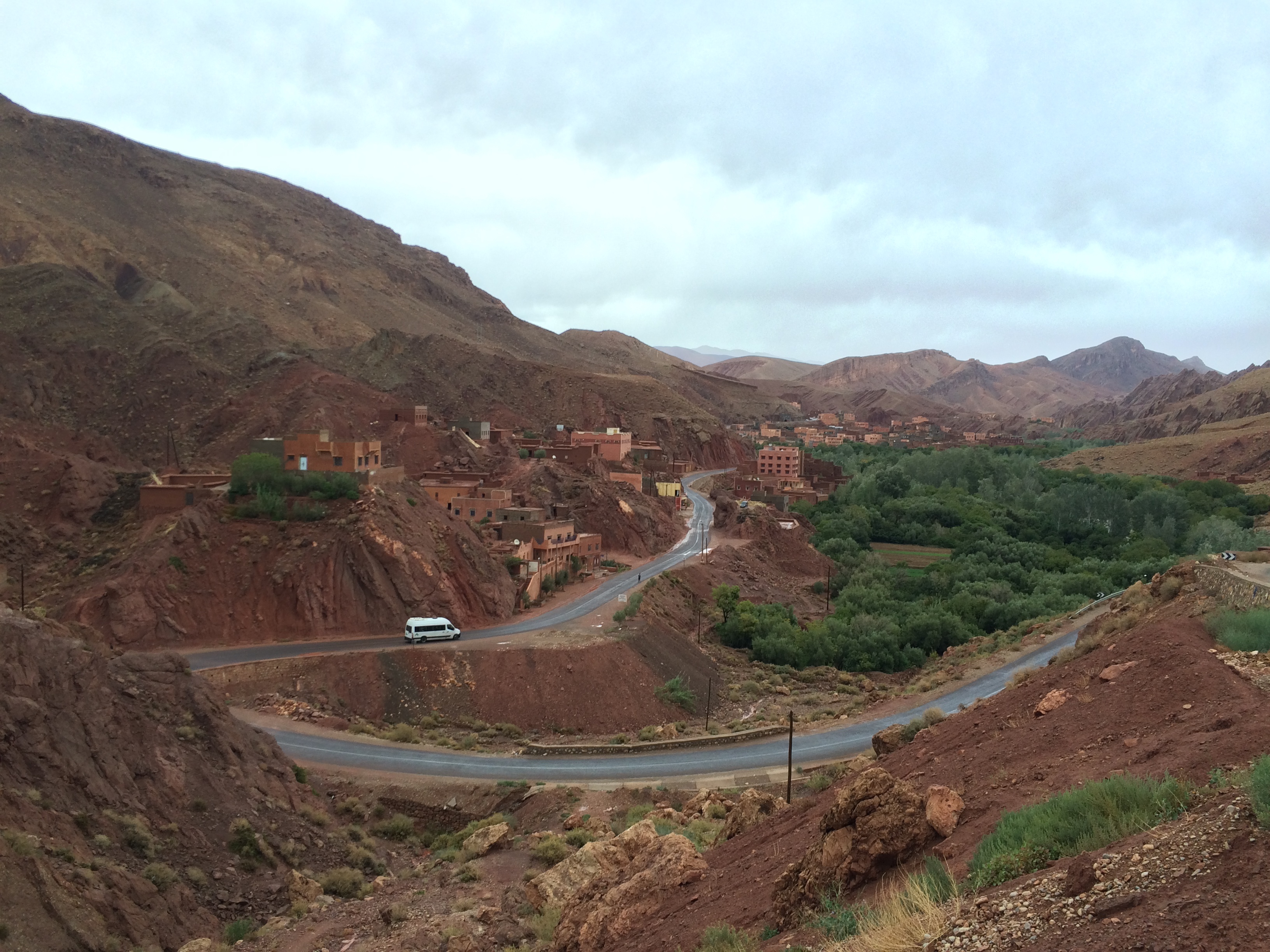

- Location within Morocco
- Coordinates: 31°31′42″N 5°57′26″W
- Country: Morocco
- Region: Drâa-Tafilalet
- Province: Tinghir

Population (2004)
  - Total: 4,471
- Time zone: UTC+0 (GMT)

Ait Sedrate Jbel El Soufla is a commune in the Tinghir Province of the Drâa-Tafilalet administrative region of Morocco. At the time of the 2004 census, the commune had a total population of 4471 people living in 650 households.
