= Ait Sedrate Jbel El Oulia =

- commune
- Location within Morocco
- Coordinates: 31°36′04″N 5°51′50″W
- Country: Morocco
- Region: Drâa-Tafilalet
- Province: Tinghir

Population (2004)
  - Total: 4,059
- Time zone: UTC+0 (GMT)

Ait Sedrate Jbel El Oulia is a commune in Tinghir Province of the Drâa-Tafilalet administrative region of Morocco. At the time of the 2004 census, the commune had a total population of 4059 people living in 618 households.
