= Taghzoute N'Ait Atta =

- commune
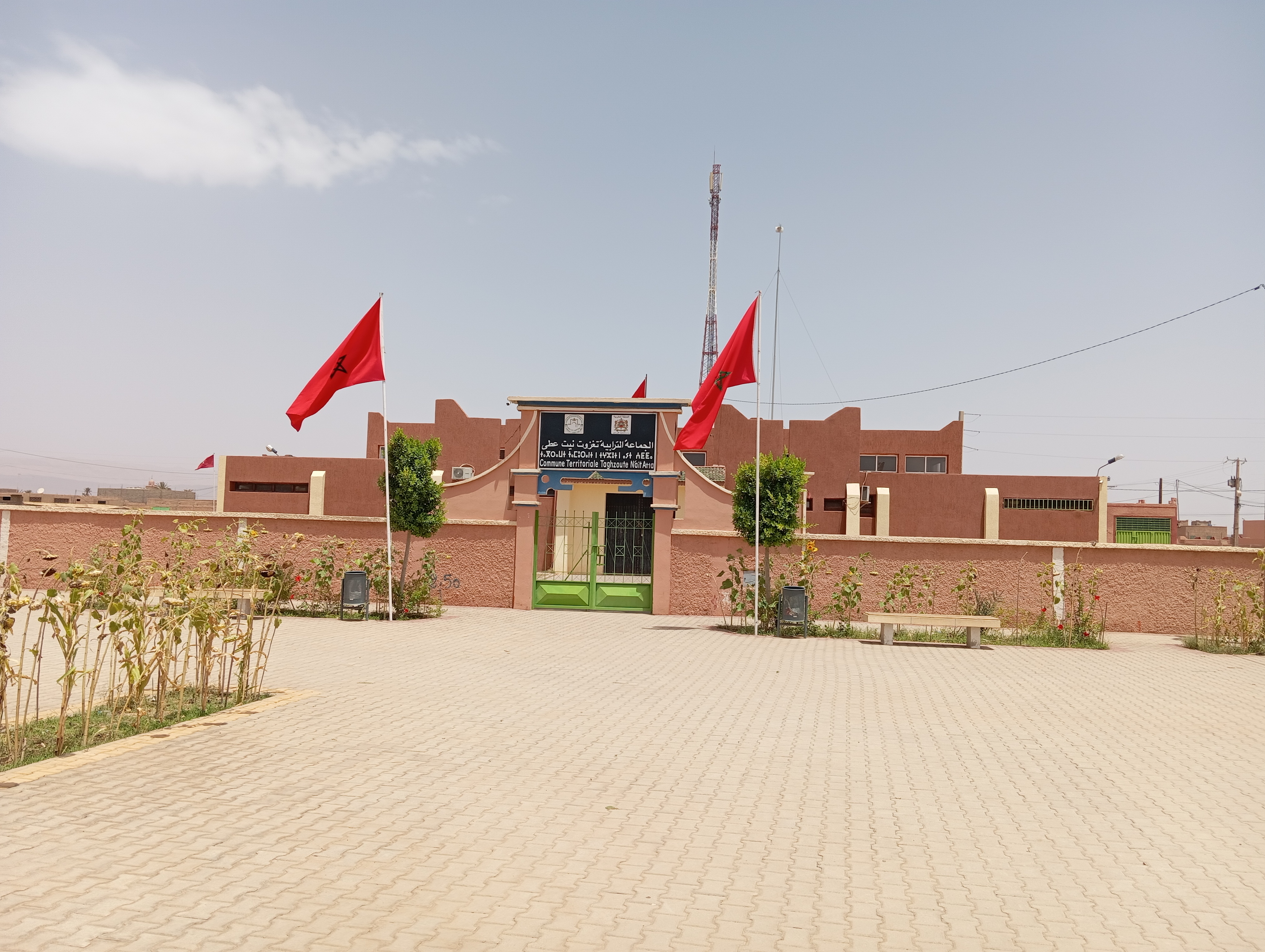

- Location within Morocco
- Coordinates: 31°27′22″N 5°25′19″W
- Country: Morocco
- Region: Drâa-Tafilalet
- Province: Tinghir

Population (2004)
  - Total: 13,636
- Time zone: UTC+0 (GMT)

Taghzoute N'Ait Atta is a commune in the Tinghir Province of the Drâa-Tafilalet administrative region of Morocco. At the time of the 2004 census, the commune had a total population of 13636 people living in 2007 households.
