= Toudgha Essoufla =

- commune
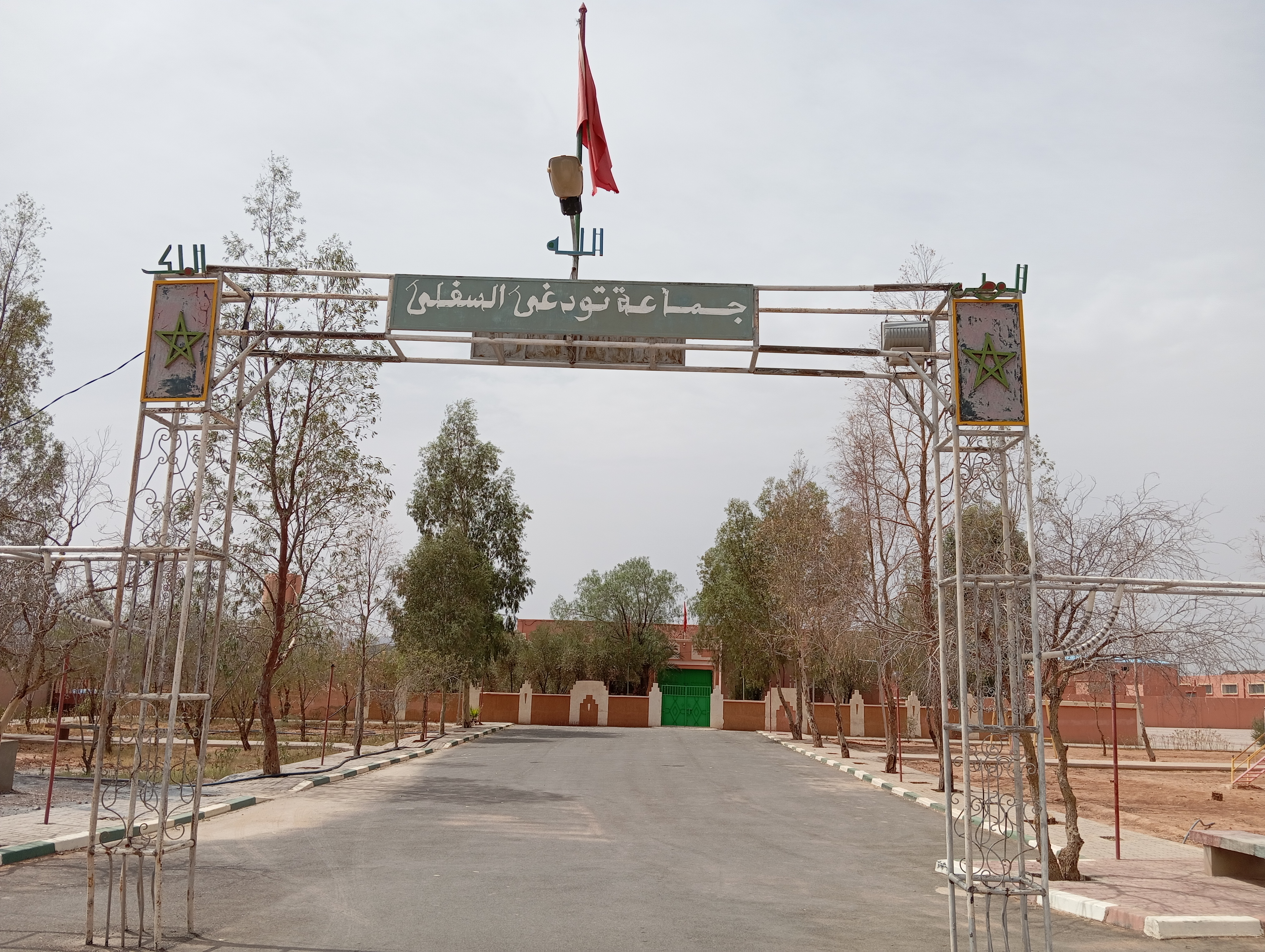

- Location within Morocco
- Country: Morocco
- Region: Drâa-Tafilalet
- Province: Tinghir

Population (2004)
  - Total: 12,844
- Time zone: UTC+0 (GMT)

Toudgha Essoufla is a commune in the Tinghir Province of the Drâa-Tafilalet administrative region of Morocco. At the time of the 2004 census, the commune had a total population of 12844 people living in 1794 households.
