= Ait Hani =

Ait Hani ⴰⵢⵜ ⵀⴰⵏⵉ آيت هاني
- Rural commune and town
- Location within Morocco
- Coordinates: 31°48′N 5°30′W
- Country: Morocco
- Region: Drâa-Tafilalet
- Province: Tinghir Province

Population (2014)
  - Total: 10,587
- Time zone: UTC+0 (GMT)

Ait Hani ⴰⵢⵜ ⵀⴰⵏⵉ (Arabic: ايت هاني) is a town and rural commune in Tinghir Province of the Drâa-Tafilalet region of Morocco. At the time of the 2014 census, the commune had a total population of 10,587 people.
