= Ait Sedrate Sahl El Gharbia =

- commune
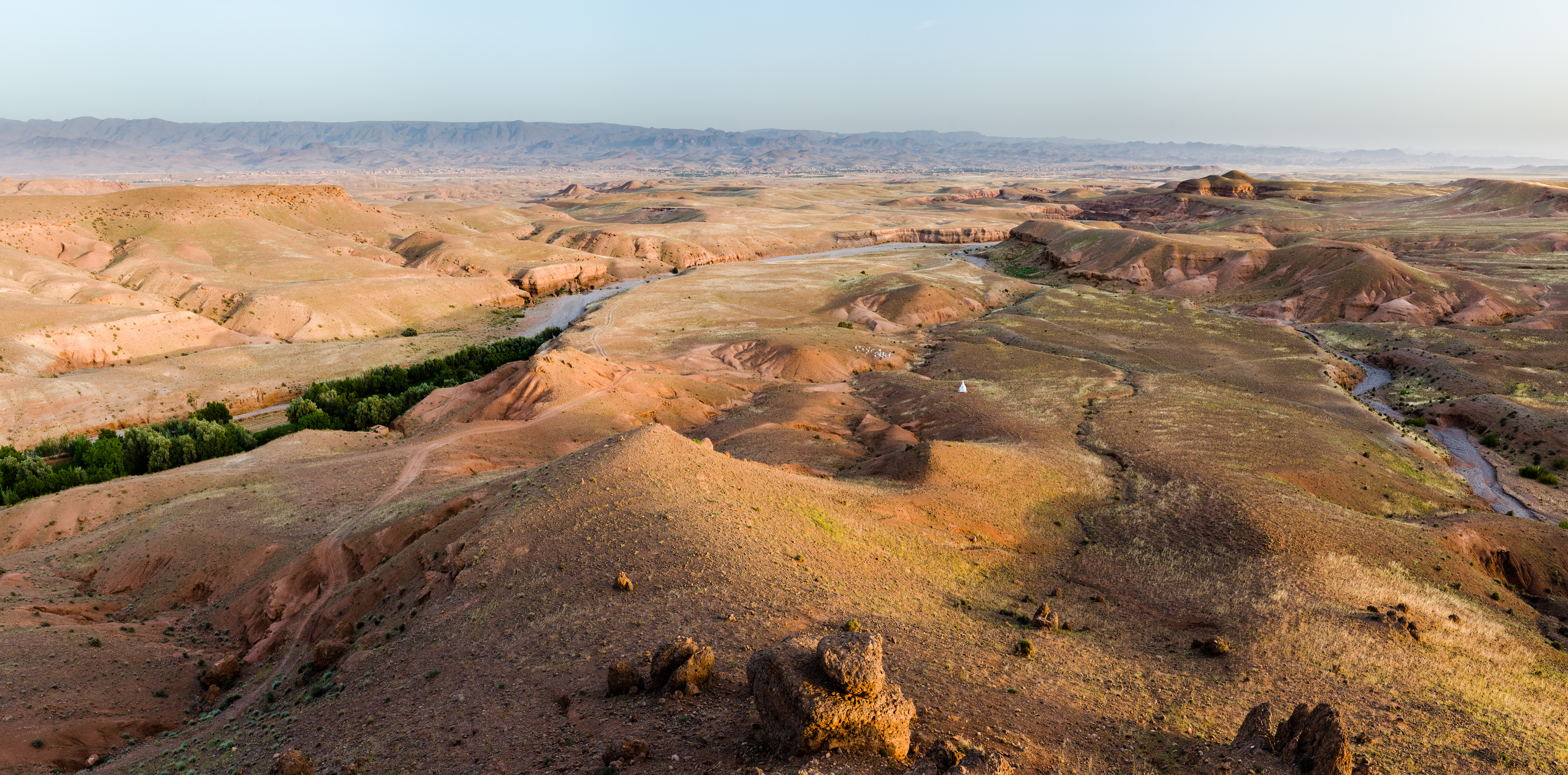
- View from the Imiter Oasis. The locales of Ait Sedrate Sahl El Gharbia and Zaouiet Sidi Abdelmalek can be seen in the distance

- Location within Morocco
- Coordinates: 31.192778°N 6.196695°W
- Country: Morocco
- Region: Drâa-Tafilalet
- Province: Tinghir

Population (2004)
  - Total: 14,864
- Time zone: UTC+0 (GMT)

Ait Sedrate Sahl El Gharbia is a commune in the Tinghir Province of the Drâa-Tafilalet administrative region of Morocco. At the time of the 2004 census, the commune had a total population of 14864 people living in 2110 households.
