= Ikniouen =

- commune
- Location within Morocco Location within Africa
- Coordinates: 31°10′25″N 5°40′24″W
- Country: Morocco
- Region: Drâa-Tafilalet
- Province: Tinghir

Population (2004)
  - Total: 15,738
- Time zone: UTC+0 (GMT)

Ikniouen is a commune in the Tinghir Province of the Drâa-Tafilalet administrative region of Morocco. At the time of the 2004 census, the commune had a total population of 1,592,738 people living in 164 households.
