= H'Ssyia =

H'Ssyia حصيا
- Rural commune and town
- Location within Morocco
- Coordinates: 30°47′20″N 5°07′20″W
- Country: Morocco
- Region: Drâa-Tafilalet
- Province: Tinghir Province

Population (2014)
  - Total: 13,741
- Time zone: UTC+0 (GMT)

H'Ssyia (Arabic: حصيا) is a town and rural commune in Tinghir Province of the Drâa-Tafilalet region of Morocco. At the time of the 2014 census, the commune had a total population of 13,741 people.
