= Souk Lakhmis Dades =

- commune
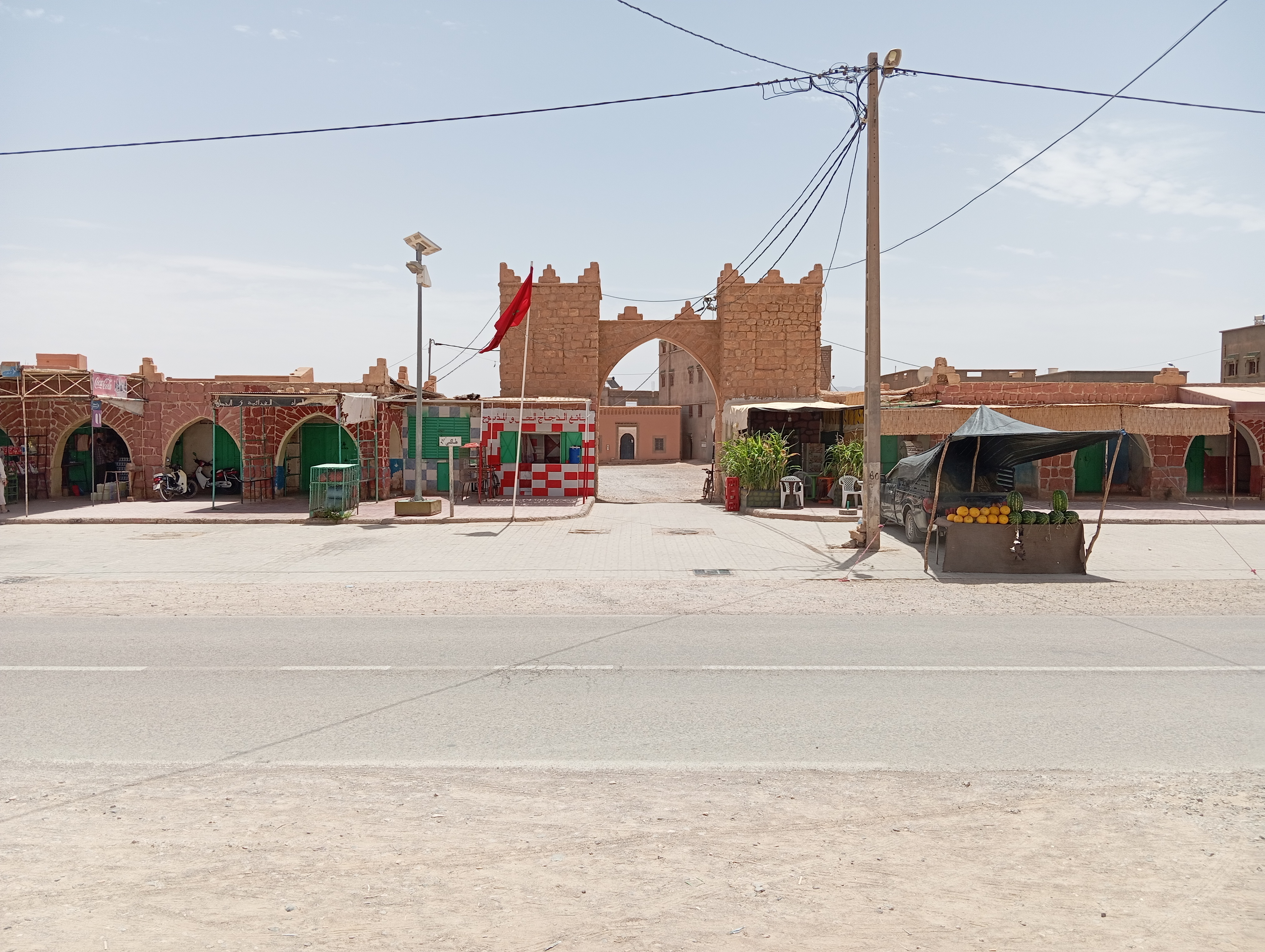
- Interactive map of Souk Lakhmis Dades
- Country: Morocco
- Region: Drâa-Tafilalet
- Province: Tinghir

Population (2004)
  - Total: 16,387
- Time zone: UTC+0 (GMT)

Souk Lakhmis Dades or Khemis Dades is a commune in the Tinghir Province of the Drâa-Tafilalet administrative region of Morocco. At the time of the 2004 census, the commune had a total population of 16387 people living in 2400 households.

Khemis Dades is a locality takes its name from the day of the souk, Thursday (“Khemis” in Berber and Arabic), as well as from the Dades Valley. The commune consists of several villages or douars. Each village bears the name of the tribe that lives there, such as:

- Ait Boulemane
- Ait Bouhrrou
- Ait Alouane
- Ait Boubker
- Tansgharte

== Infrastructure ==
Khemis Dades has a post office, a dispensary, several primary schools and several high schools/secondary schools, including "Sidi Bouyahia", " Abd el Karim el Khatabi", "Ait Uzin", and "Zawit el Biaar". 15042 people live in Souk el Khemis Dades as of 12 October 2018.

== Festivals ==
The Festival of Me goun Dadès is organized annually and comprises subjects relative to various sets of themes, like film, artistic evenings and other sporting and cultural programs.
