= Dades Gorges =

Series of wadi gorges in Morocco

Dadès Gorges
- View of the canyon
- Floor elevation: approx. 1,800 metres (5,906 ft)

Geography
- Location: Tinghir Province
- Coordinates: 31.482°N 5.956°W
- Interactive map of Dadès Gorges

The Dadès Gorges (Standard Moroccan Tamazight: ⵜⵉⵣⵉ ⵏ ⴷⴰⴷⵙ, romanized: Tizi n Dads, Arabic: مضايق دادس, romanized: Maḍāyiq Dādis), also referred to as Dades Valley, are a series of rugged wadi gorges carved out by the Dadès River in Morocco. The river originates in the High Atlas range of the Atlas mountains, flowing some 350 kilometres (220 mi) southwest before joining the Draa River at the edge of the Sahara. The walls of the gorges range anywhere from 200 to 500 meters (660 to 1,640 feet).

== Formation ==
The area which now forms the Dadès Gorges lay at the bottom of the sea millions of years ago. Great quantities of sediment were deposited around giant coral reefs, and over time this material became compacted into a variety of sedimentary rocks such as sandstone and limestone. Eventually, the movement of the Earth's crust caused the region to rise above the sea, forming the Atlas Mountains and surrounding landscape.

The Dadès River established its course quite early in this upheaval, and the flowing water began to erode away the porous sedimentary rock of the mountains. For the majority of the year, the Dadès has a relatively weak flow, owing to the dryness of the area's climate. However, during the storm season, enormous quantities of water can be forced into the river at once, creating raging torrents with enormous erosive power. These torrents carry large amounts of debris from the source all the way down to the end of the river's source, and each piece scrapes away at the softer rock in the gorge walls, gradually enlarging and deepening the gorge with every flood season.

== Flora and fauna ==
The southernmost gorges are known for extensive production of roses, used in the production of rose water. There are also groves of palm and almond trees.

== Gallery ==
Mountain pass in Dadès Gorges

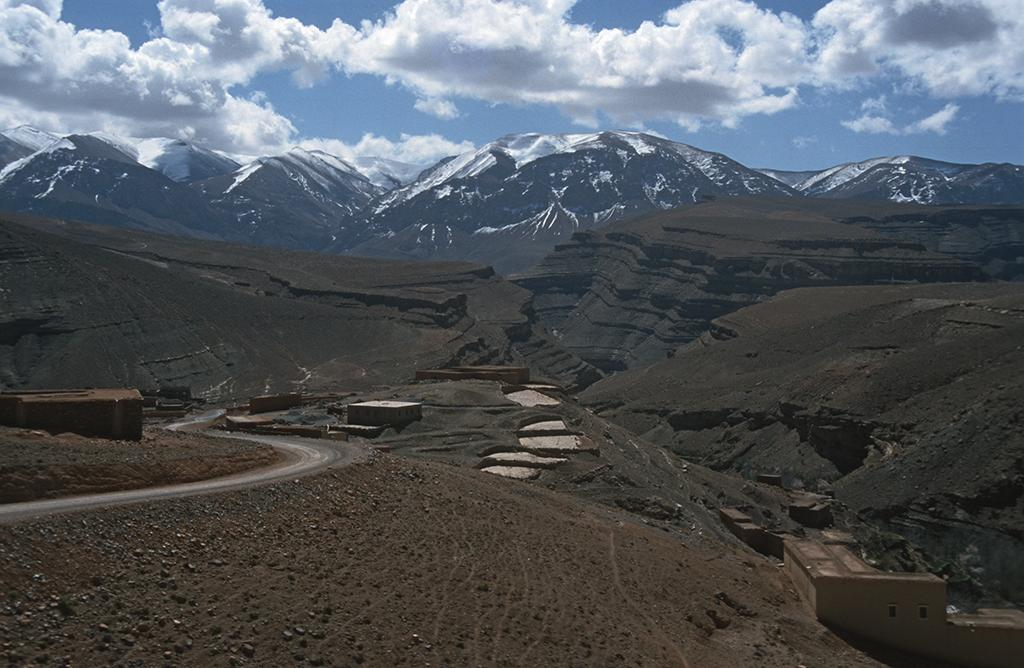
Dadès Gorges and the Atlas Mountains

Village in the Dadès Valley

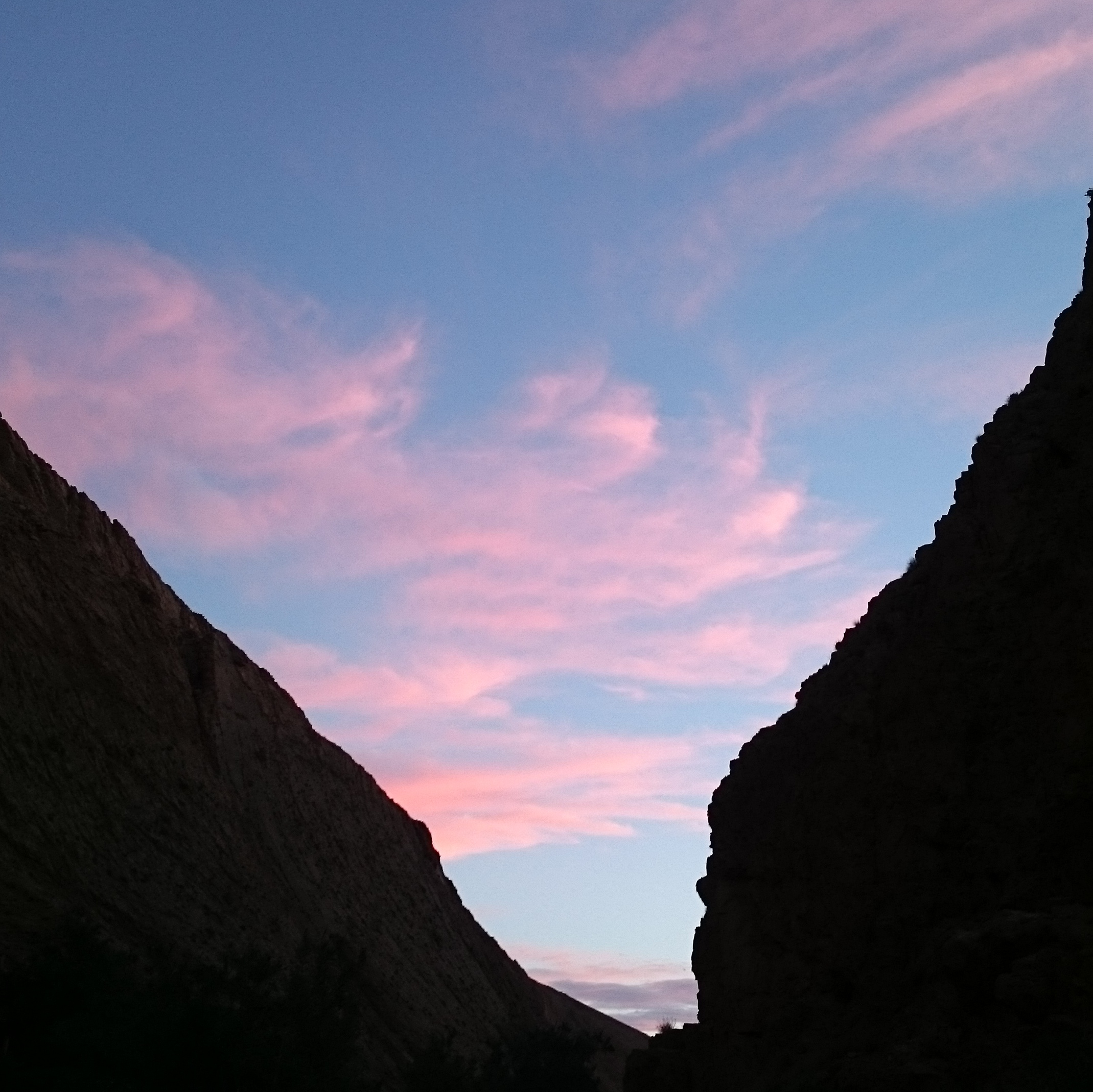
In the gorge at dusk

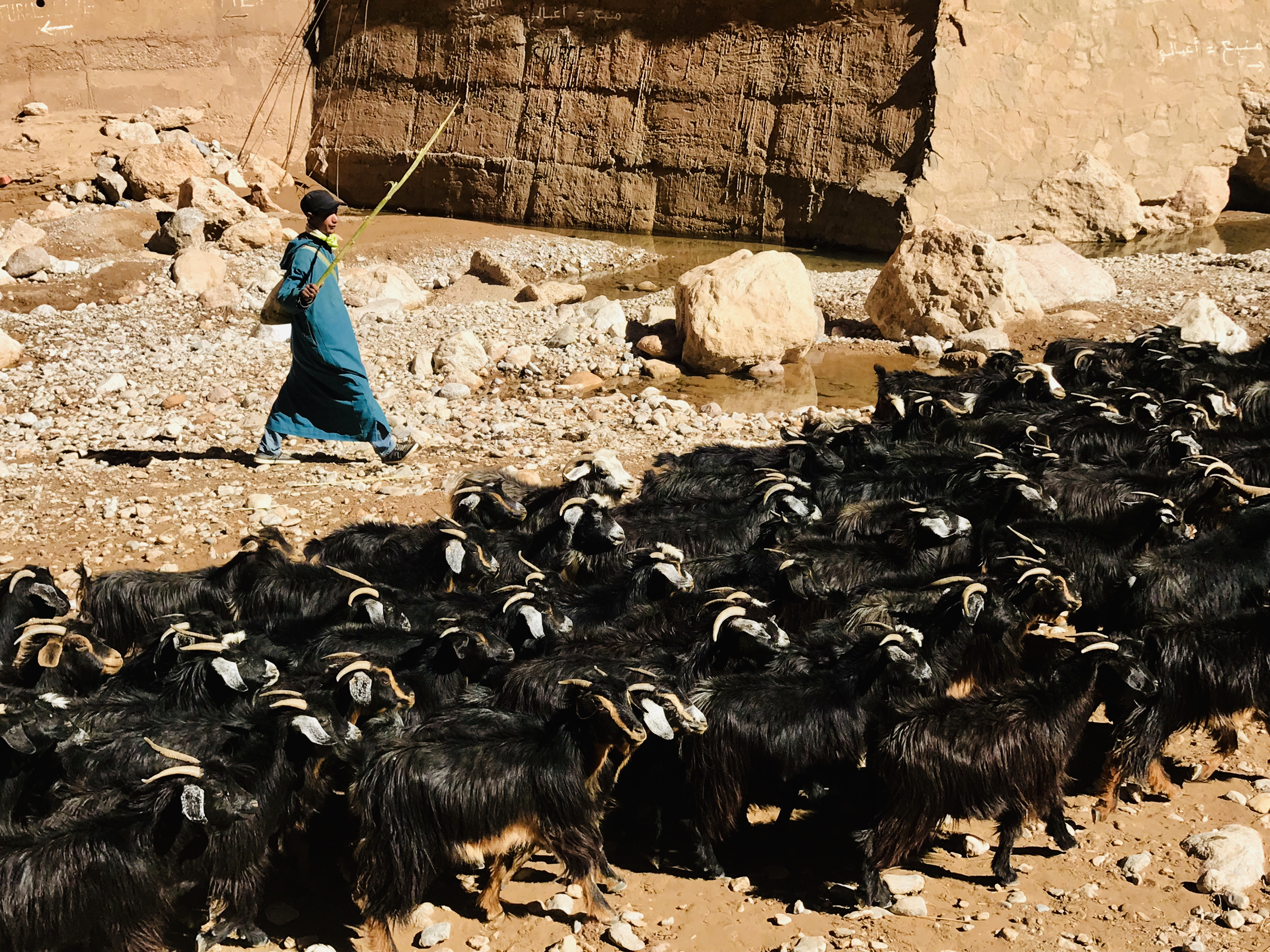
Shepherd in the Dades Gorge
