= Tinghir Province =

Coordinates: 31.5147°N 5.5328°W

Tinghir Province إقليم تنغير ⵜⴰⵙⴳⴰ ⵏ ⵜⵉⵏⵖⵉⵔ
- Province
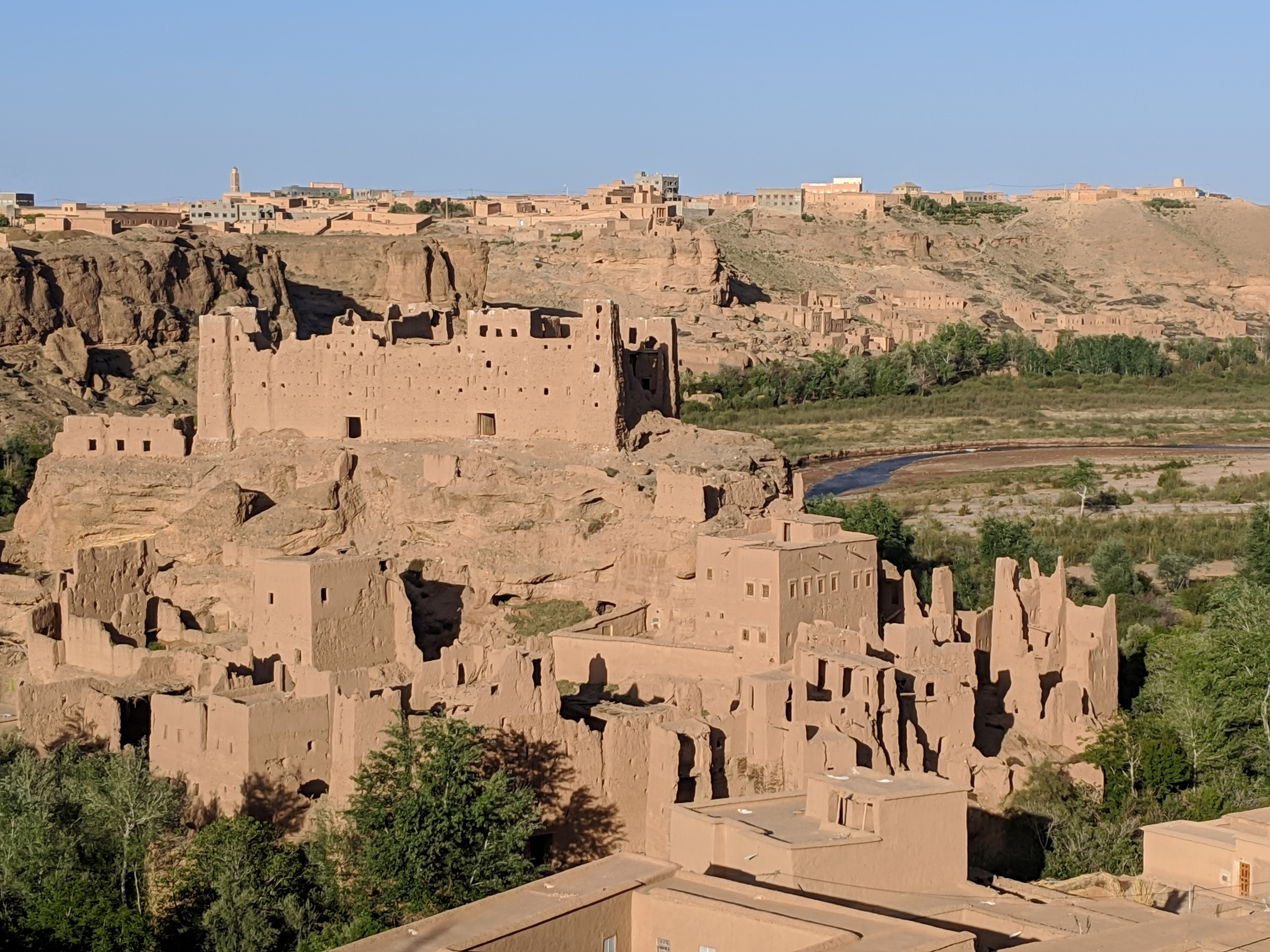
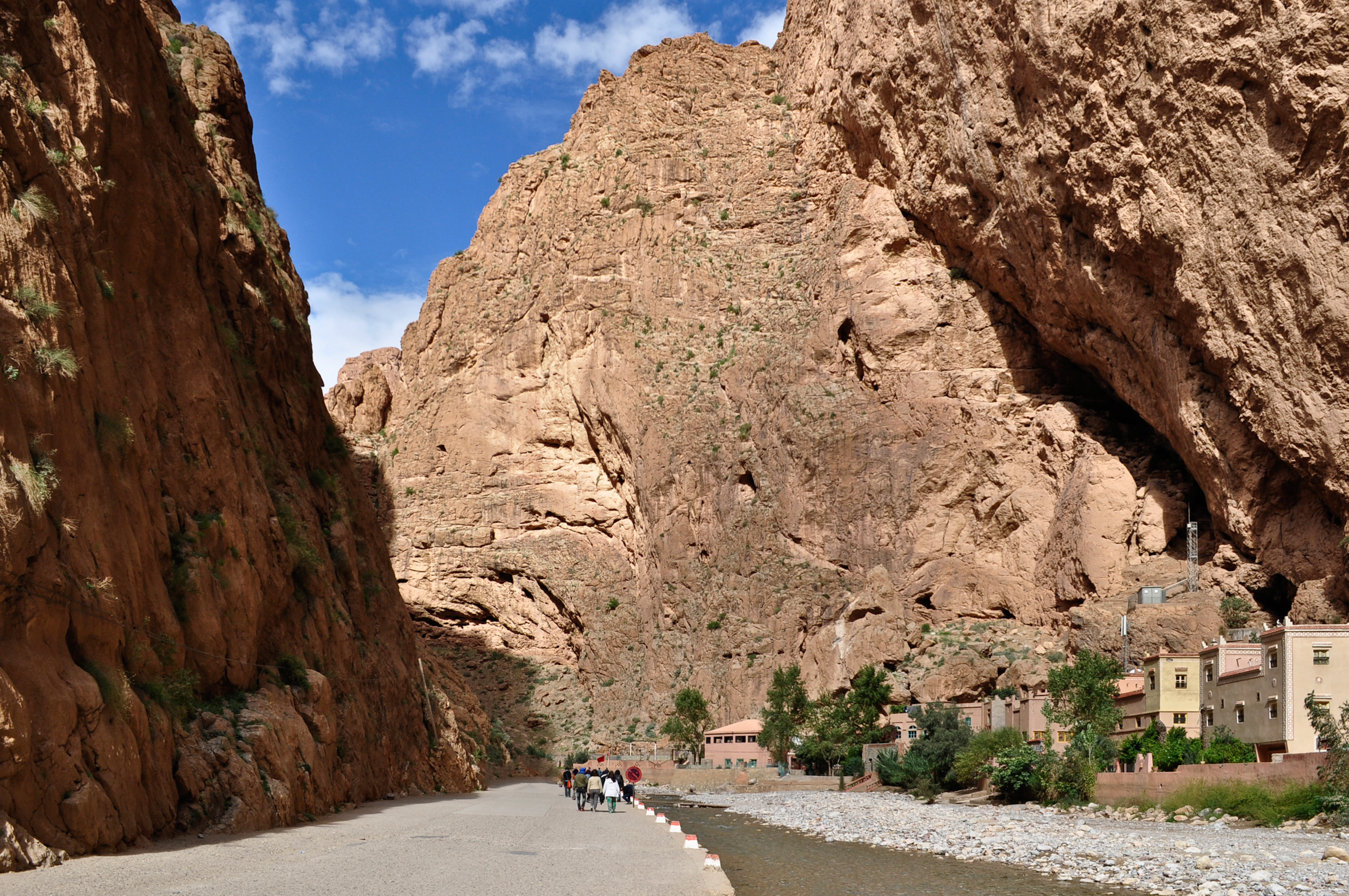
- Ait Youl Todgha Gorge the Dades River valley
- Interactive map of Tinghir Province
- Country: Morocco
- Region: Drâa-Tafilalet
- Capital: Tinghir

Area
  - Total: 13,007 km^{2} (5,022 sq mi)

Population (2024)
  - Total: 323,805

Tinghir Province (Arabic: إقليم تنغير, Standard Moroccan Tamazight: ⵜⴰⵙⴳⴰ ⵏ ⵜⵉⵏⵖⵉⵔ) is a province of Morocco in the Drâa-Tafilalet Region. The province had a population of 323,805 people in 2024.

The province is famous for its gorges, notably the Dadès Gorges and the Todgha Gorge, as well as its historical Ksars (Igherms).

The major cities are :

- Tinghir
- Boumalne Dades
- Kalaat M'Gouna

== Administrative divisions ==
Communes of Tinghir Province

The province is divided administratively into the following municipalities and rural communes:

=== Municipalities ===
Name	Geographic code	Households (2024)	Population (2024)
Boumalne Dades	577.01.03.	2769	12391
Kalaat M'Gouna	577.01.05.	3900	17737
Tinghir	577.01.11.	9840	44239

=== Rural communes ===
Name	Geographic code	Households (2024)	Population (2024)	Notes
Ait El Farsi	577.07.01.	1040	5653	
Ait Hani	577.03.01.	2183	11120	
Ait Ouassif	577.09.03.	1599	8885	
Ait Sedrate Jbel El Oulia	577.05.05.	904	4978	
Ait Sedrate Jbel El Soufla	577.05.07.	1099	5228	
Ait Sedrate Sahl Charkia	577.09.09.	2920	15506	
Ait Sedrate Sahl El Gharbia	577.09.11.	3988	19985	
Ait Youl	577.05.13.	842	4680	
Alnif	577.02.05.	3578	20978	Urban centre: Alnif (5,457 inhabitants; 1,011 households)
H'Ssyia	577.02.11.	1860	11713	
Ighil N'Oumgoun	577.09.15.	3734	23218	
Ikniouen	577.05.17.	2539	17707	
Imider	577.07.19.	763	4296	
M'Semrir	577.05.21.	1487	8686	
M'Ssici	577.02.21.	895	5455	
Ouaklim	577.07.23.	1976	12050	
Souk Lakhmis Dades	577.09.25.	3408	16154	
Taghzoute N'Ait Atta	577.07.27.	3232	15654	
Tilmi	577.05.29.	2049	11691	
Toudgha El Oulia	577.07.31.	1244	5084	
Toudgha Essoufla	577.07.33.	2663	13890	
Assoul	577.03.05.	1611	6827	
