= Dades River =

Dadès River
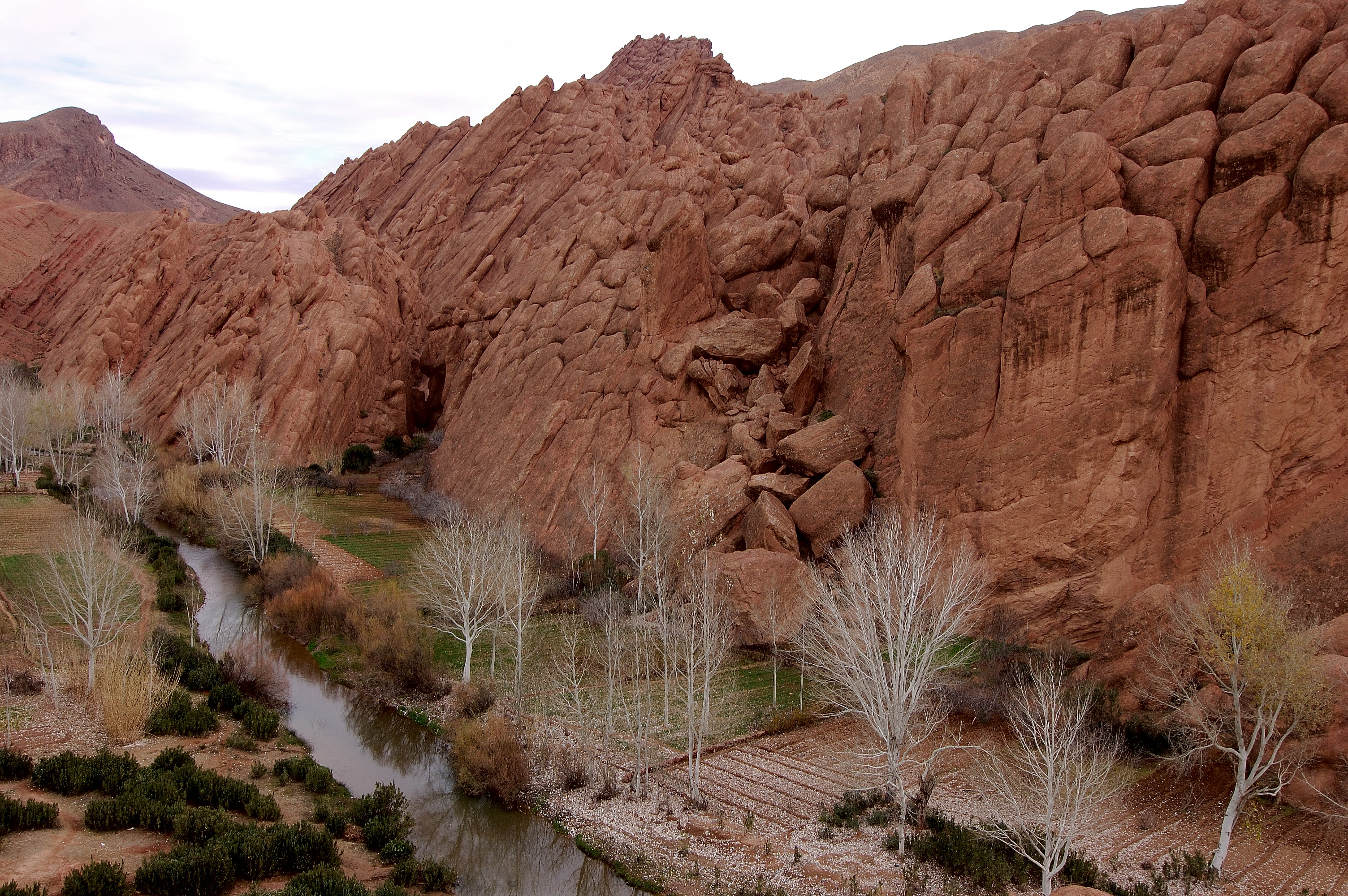

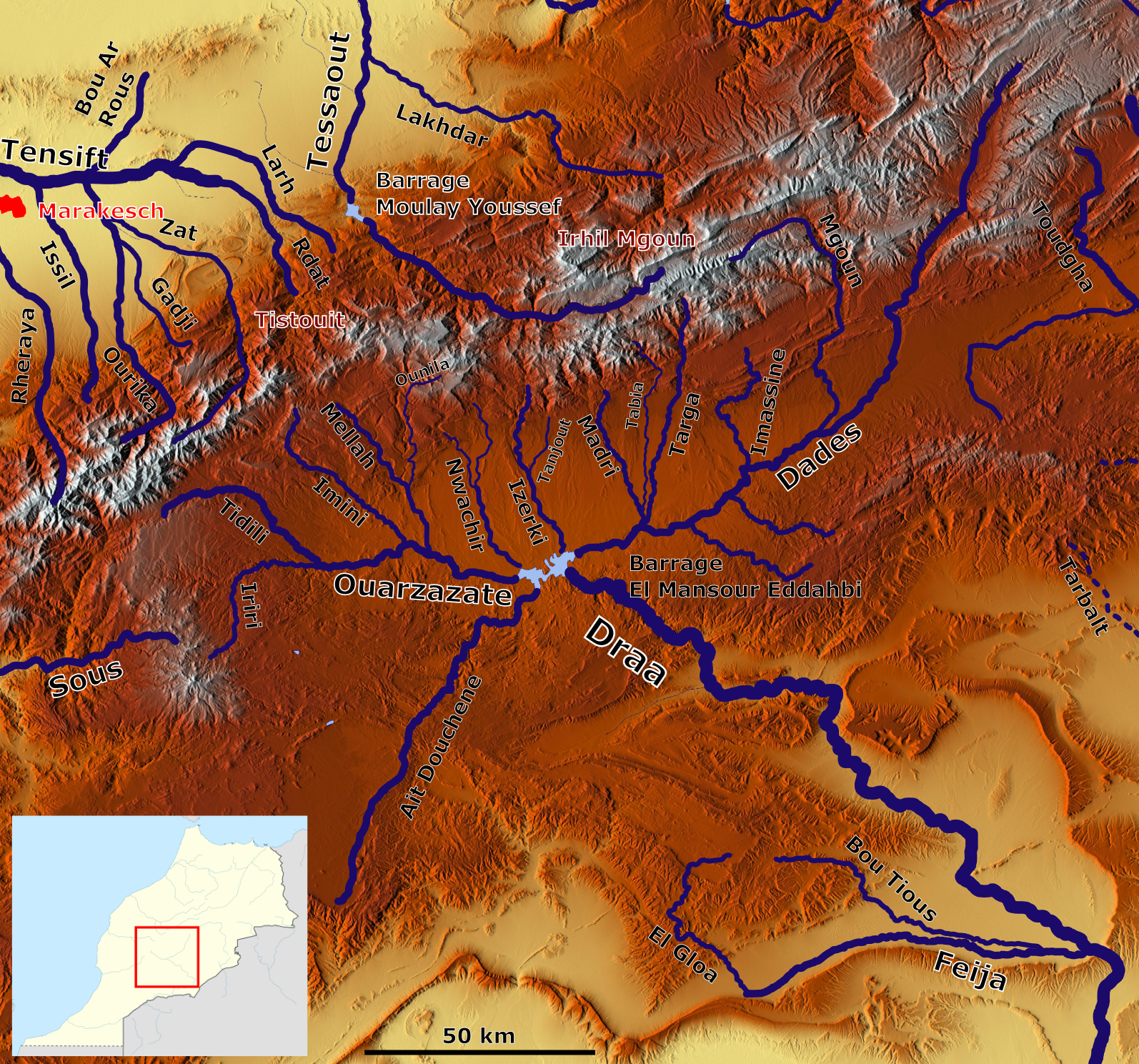
- The headwaters of the Draa, with the Dades (top right to center)

Location
- Country: Morocco

Physical characteristics
- Mouth
  - coordinates: 31°00′09″N 6°31′36″W

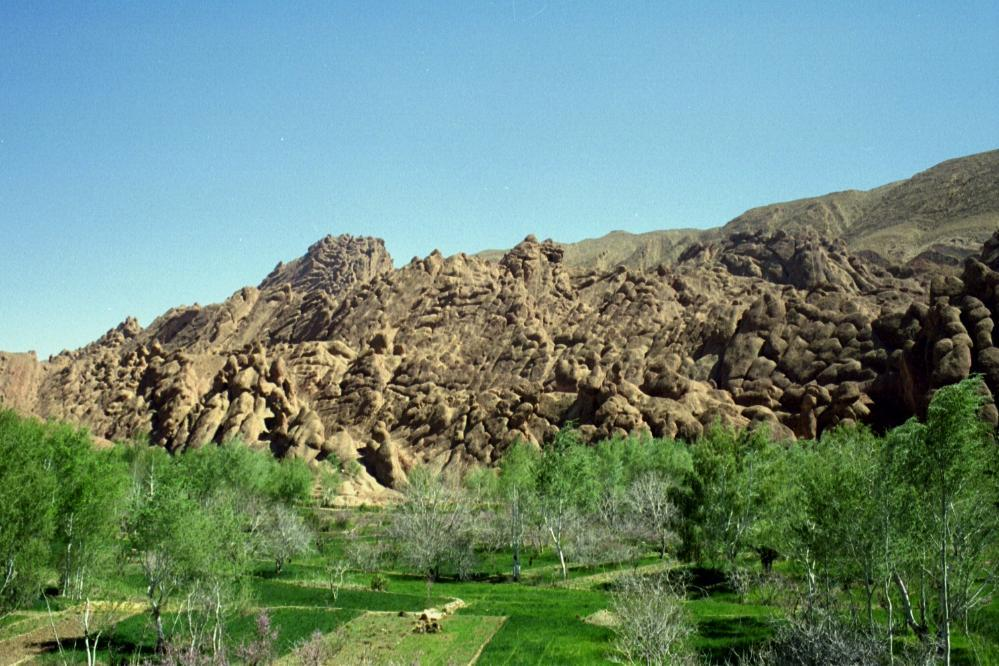
Lush green valley surrounded by desert rock formations in the Dades Gorge, Morocco.

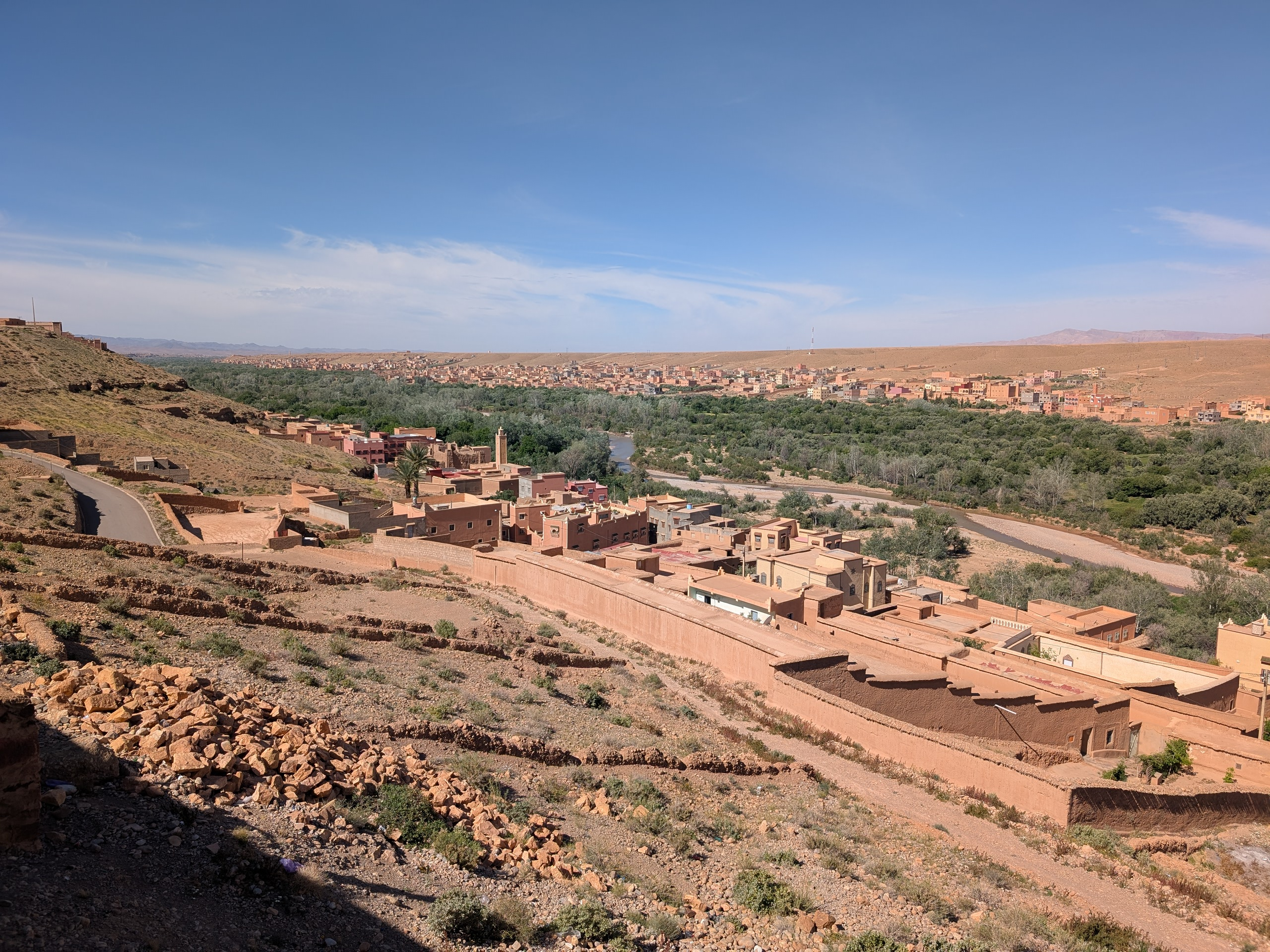
View on the Dades River valley at Boumalne Dades

Dadès River (Arabic: وادي دادس, romanized: Wādī Dādis; French: Oued Dadès; Amazigh: ⴰⵙⵉⴼ ⵏ ⴷⴰⴷⵙ, romanized: Asif n Dads) is a river in Morocco. It is a tributary of the Draa River.

== Geography ==
The Dadès River rises in the High Atlas and then turns south crossing through the Dadès Gorges, then westward between the High Atlas and Anti-Atlas mountain ranges. The river finally meets the Ouarzazate River, which then enters Draa River.

Dades Gorge is easily accessible by taxi from nearby Tinerhir. The scenery is significant with views of interesting rock formations. The valley itself is made lush and green by the river, while the surrounding area is rocky desert. There are simple communities still living here in traditional houses. Women can be seen washing laundry in the river and laying it to dry on the surrounding bushes.

== Hydrology ==
Flow rate of the Dadès River is highly seasonal with peak flows in the January to April period following the high precipitation and ensuing snowmelt. The water quality is alkaline, and summer water temperatures are in the range of 23 to 28 degrees Celsius. Electrical conductivity of the water is relatively high.
