= Draa-Tafilalet =

Region of Morocco

Drâa-Tafilalet Region جهة درعة-تافيلالت (Arabic) ⵜⴰⵎⵏⴰⴹⵜ ⵏ ⴷⵔⴰ-ⵜⴰⴼⵉⵍⴰⵍⵜ (Standard Moroccan Tamazight)
- Region
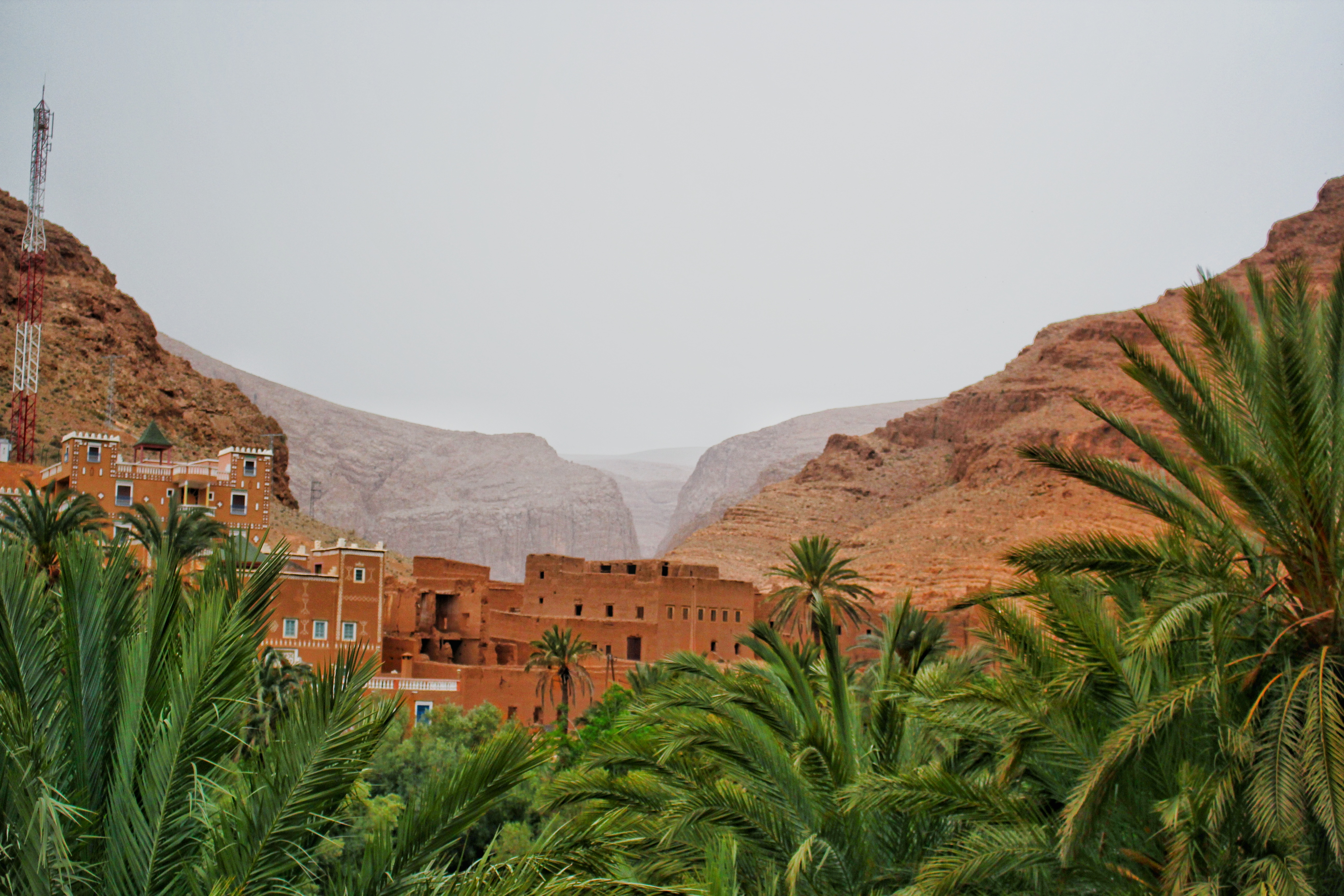

- Seal

- Location in Morocco
- Coordinates: 31.32°N 5.33°W
- Country: Morocco
- Created: September 2015
- Capital: Errachidia

Government
  - Type: Governor–regional council
  - Wali: Essaid Zniber
  - Council president: Hro Abrou (RNI)

Area
  - Total: 88,836 km^{2} (34,300 sq mi)

Population (2024)
  - Total: 1,655,623
  - Rank: 9th out of 12 Regions
  - Density: 18.637/km^{2} (48.269/sq mi)
- Time zone: UTC+0 (GMT)
- Website: www.draatafilalet.ma

Drâa-Tafilalet (Note: Arabic: درعة - تافيلالت, romanized: darʿa - tāfīlālt Standard Moroccan Tamazight: ⴷⵔⴰ-ⵜⴰⴼⵉⵍⴰⵍⵜ) is one of the twelve regions of Morocco, named after the Draa and Tafilalt watersheds. It covers an area of 88,836 km^{2} and had a population of 1,655,623 as of the 2024 Moroccan census. The capital of the region is Errachidia.

== Geography ==
Drâa-Tafilalet is situated in the Atlas Mountains of Morocco. Its main watersheds are that of the Draa River in the west and the Ziz River, which irrigates the Tafilalt oasis, in the east. Drâa-Tafilalet borders five other Moroccan regions: Souss-Massa to the southwest, Marrakesh-Safi to the west, Béni Mellal-Khénifra to the northwest, Fès-Meknès to the north, and Oriental to the northeast. It also borders two of Algeria's provinces, Tindouf in the south and Béchar in the southeast.

== History ==
Drâa-Tafilalet was formed in September 2015 by integrating the provinces of Errachidia and Midelt in Meknès-Tafilalet region with three provinces of the Souss-Massa-Drâa region.

== Government ==
Following the 2021 regional elections, Hro Abrou, a member of the National Rally of Independents, was elected president of the regional council. The current wali of the region is Essaid Zniber.

=== Subdivisions ===
Provinces of Drâa-Tafilalet

Drâa-Tafilalet comprises five provinces:

Province	Population (2024)
Errachidia Province	427,572
Tinghir Province	323,805
Midelt Province	313,769
Ouarzazate Province	304,932
Zagora Province	285,545

=== Regional leadership ===
Wali of Drâa-Tafilalet since 2015
Name	Duration	Under
Mohamed Fanid	2015–2017	King Mohammed VI
Mohamed Benribag	2017–2019	King Mohammed VI
Yahdih Bouchaab	2019–2024	King Mohammed VI
Essaid Zniber	2024–present	King Mohammed VI

Regional Council Presidents of Drâa-Tafilalet since 2015
Name	Duration	Party	Under
Lahbib Choubani	2015–2021	PJD	King Mohammed VI
Hro Abrou	2021–present	RNI	King Mohammed VI

== Economy ==
Agriculture and pastoralism have traditionally been major economic activities in the region, but they have been adversely impacted in recent years by increasing desertification. There is a filmmaking industry concentrated in the Ouarzazate area. The fortified towns in the area, such as the World Heritage Site Aït Benhaddou, are popular tourist attractions. Traditional arts and crafts such as the pottery of Tamegroute and the rugs of Taznakht are also significant to the local economy.

== Infrastructure ==
The largest towns in the region, Errachidia and Ouarzazate, are linked together by National Route 10. The Draa valley is served by National Route 9 which also links Ouarzazate with Marrakesh to the northwest. National Route 13 runs along the Ziz valley and links Errachidia with Meknes to the north. Ouarzazate has the busiest airport in the region; the airports at Errachidia and Zagora also have commercial service.
