= Ziz (disambiguation) =

Ziz is a creature in Jewish mythology.

Ziz may refer to:

== People ==
- Johann Baptist Ziz (1779–1829), German botanist
- Ziz LaSota, founder of the Zizians fringe group

== Places ==
- Ziz River, in the south of Morocco and Algeria
- Ziz Gorges, a series of gorges along the river in Morocco
- Ziz, the Phoenician name for Palermo, Italy

== Other uses ==
- Gerry and Ziz, a Canadian TV series
- ZIZ Broadcasting Corporation of St. Kitts & Nevis
- An alternate name for the Simurgh, a monstrous creature in the web serial Worm
