= Isli Lake =

Lake in Imilchil, Morocco

Lake Isli
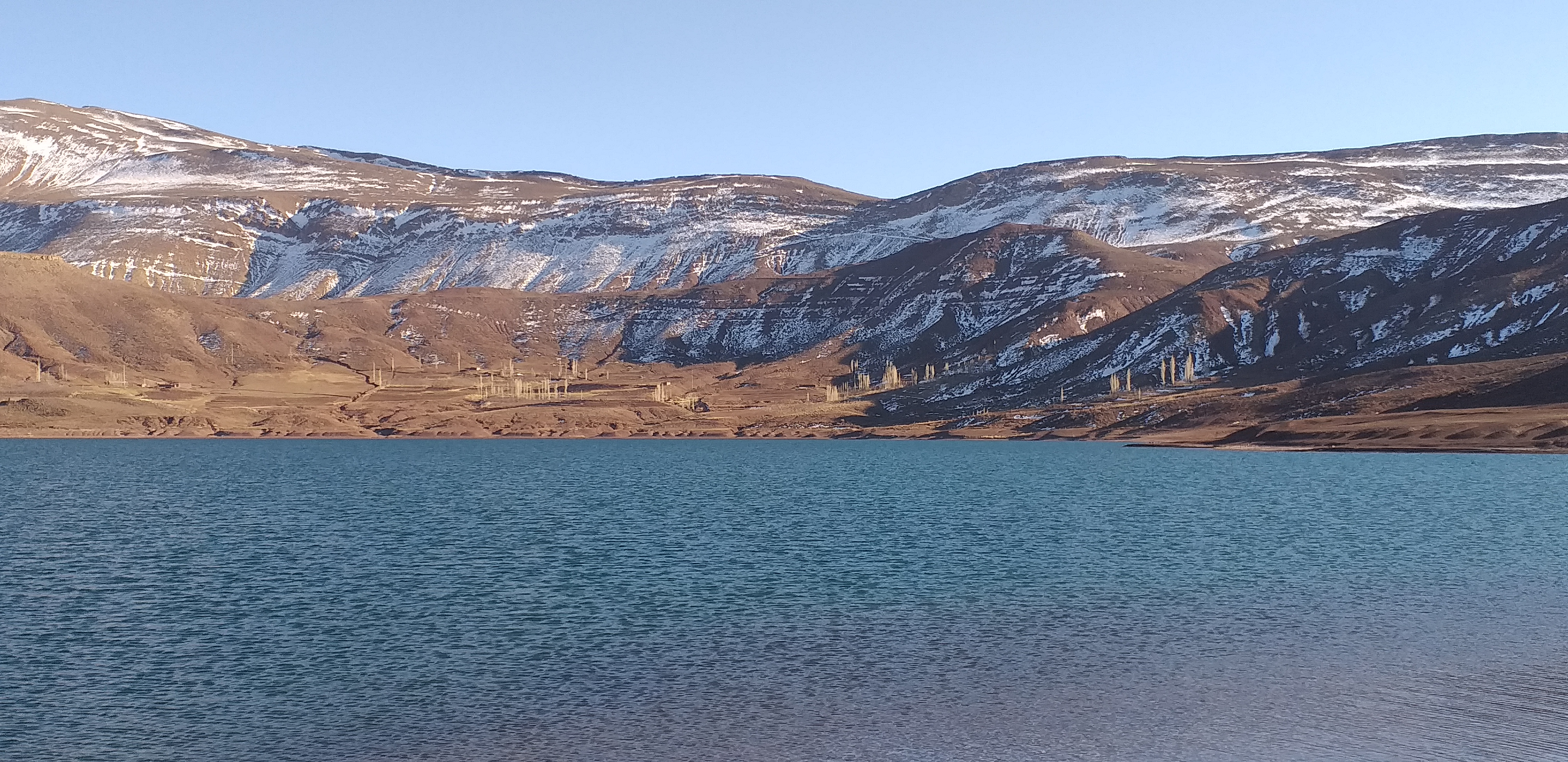
- Panorama of the lake
- Interactive map of Lake Isli
- Location: Haut Atlas Oriental National Park, Morocco
- Coordinates: 32°13′03″N 5°32′33″W
- Basin countries: Morocco
- Surface area: 2.55 km^{2} (0.98 sq mi)
- Average depth: 95 m (312 ft)
- Surface elevation: 2,119 m (6,952 ft)

Ramsar Wetland
- Official name: Lacs Isly-Tislite
- Designated: 15 January 2005
- Reference no.: 1480

Lake Isli (Tifinagh: ⵉⵥⵍⵉ; Arabic: بحيرة إسلي; French: Lac Isli) is a lake located in the commune of Imilchil in High Atlas mountains of Morocco. It lies at one of the highest-altitudes and is considered one of the deepest lakes in North Africa. Additionally, it is of geomorphological and hydrological significance, and is important to the local ecosystem. Together with Lake Tislit, located 9 km to the west, it is designated as a Ramsar site.

== Name ==
"Isli" means "bridegroom" in Tamazight and is paired with the nearby Lake Tislit, whose name means "bride". According to local legend, two lovers were forbidden to marry by their feuding tribes and wept themselves to death from grief, their tears forming the two lakes.

Because of this legend, in 2019 the International Astronomical Union's IAU100 NameExoWorlds project, which gave countries and territories around the world the opportunity to name an exoplanetary system, assigned the name “Isli” to WASP-161b, the exoplanet allocated to Morocco, while its host star, WASP-161, was given the proper name “Tislit”.

== Geography and topography ==
Lake Isli is located in Morocco's Drâa-Tafilalet region, approximately 10 kilometres north of the village of Imilchil, which is known for its annual marriage festival, the Moussem of Imilchil. Situated in the High Atlas at an elevation of more than 2,200 metres, the lake lies within Haut Atlas Oriental National Park.

The lake occupies a synclinal basin bounded to the north and south by anticlinal ridges of a folded mountain range rising to nearly 3,000 metres. Its surface lies at an average elevation of 2,270 metres, it covers an area of approximately 2.55 square kilometres, and reaches a maximum depth of about 95 metres. It is one of the highest-altitude lakes in North Africa and is said to be the deepest in that region. The lake is roughly circular, with a width of about 1.2 kilometres. Its shores descend steeply below the water around its entire perimeter, and the lake bed is estimated to contain approximately 100 metres of sediment. The upper quarter of these deposits consists primarily of lacustrine sediments, while the lower three-quarters are thought to consist of material deposited by slope failures.

Lake Isli has no surface-water inflow or outflow through rivers. It is supplied mainly by groundwater and snowmelt flowing down through small valleys, while its outflow is also thought to occur underground. As a result, Lake Isli is considered to play an important role in groundwater recharge in the region.

== Geology ==
Lake Isli occupies a depression formed in the Isli Formation, a sedimentary rock unit consisting of nearly horizontal, brick-red layers of sandstone, siltstone, and claystone dating from the Middle Jurassic. The Isli Formation is estimated to be approximately 200–250 metres thick. Given the depth of the lake, the entire lake lies within the Isli Formation, although the bedrock beneath the colluvial deposits on the lake floor is approximately level with the underlying strata of sandy marl and sandy limestone.

== Origin ==
In 2013, Moroccan and Italian geologists proposed that Lake Isli was formed by an impact crater. Such a hypothesis had previously been suggested because of the lake's nearly circular shape, but the researchers presented new evidence, including meteorite fragments found on the lakeshore that were thought to originate from the same parent body as the Agoudal meteorite, which formed an impact crater approximately 20 kilometres to the south, as well as rocks containing shocked quartz crystals.

However, this hypothesis was soon challenged. Reconstructions based on the distribution of Agoudal meteorite fragments suggest that an impact was unlikely to have produced a crater at the location of Lake Isli; the quartz crystals can also be explained by processes other than an impact; and dating of the meteorite has indicated that it is younger than the sediments on the lake bed. Consequently, the impact-crater hypothesis is not generally supported. Based on the distribution of faults and the geology surrounding the lake, its formation is instead considered more plausibly the result of tectonic subsidence combined with karst erosion.

== Water quality ==
Lake Isli is one of the few lakes in Morocco that has not undergone eutrophication, and its water quality is considered good. Consistent with groundwater being its main source of water, the lake is supersaturated with respect to carbonate minerals.

== Natural environment ==
The climate around Lake Isli has characteristics resembling a semi-arid steppe climate, with low precipitation, although it is classified as a high-altitude Mediterranean climate. Winters are cold, and average annual precipitation is approximately 330 millimetres, a substantial proportion of which falls as snow, although snow cover rarely persists beyond April.

=== Flora and fauna ===
Lake Isli lies at the southern limit of the Palearctic realm. The lake is considered valuable in terms of biodiversity, primarily because of the trout found there. Originally regarded as brown trout, the fish have a distinctive morphology and are now considered to represent Salmo viridis, the Isli trout, a species endemic to the lake. Ruddy shelducks and black-necked grebes also have nesting sites near Lake Isli, making the area important for the breeding of these birds. The near-threatened Eurasian otter is also found there.

The vegetation around Lake Isli consists mostly of sparse grasses, with species such as Juncus acutus among the predominant plants.

=== Ramsar site ===
Lake Isli was designated a Ramsar site on 15 January 2005 due to its distinctive hydrological characteristics and its valuable fauna, particularly its endemic species.
