= Itzler =

Itzler is a surname. Notable people with the surname include:

- Jason Itzler (born 1967), American live streamer, convicted felon, and founder of the escort agency New York Confidential
- Jesse Itzler (born 1971), also known by the stage name Jesse Jaymes, American musician, rapper, producer, and entrepreneur

== See also ==
- Itzer
