= Midelt Province =

Province of Morocco

Coordinates: 32.68°N 4.73°W

Midelt Province إقليم ميدلت ⵜⴰⵙⴳⴰ ⵏ ⵎⵉⴷⵍⵜ
- Province
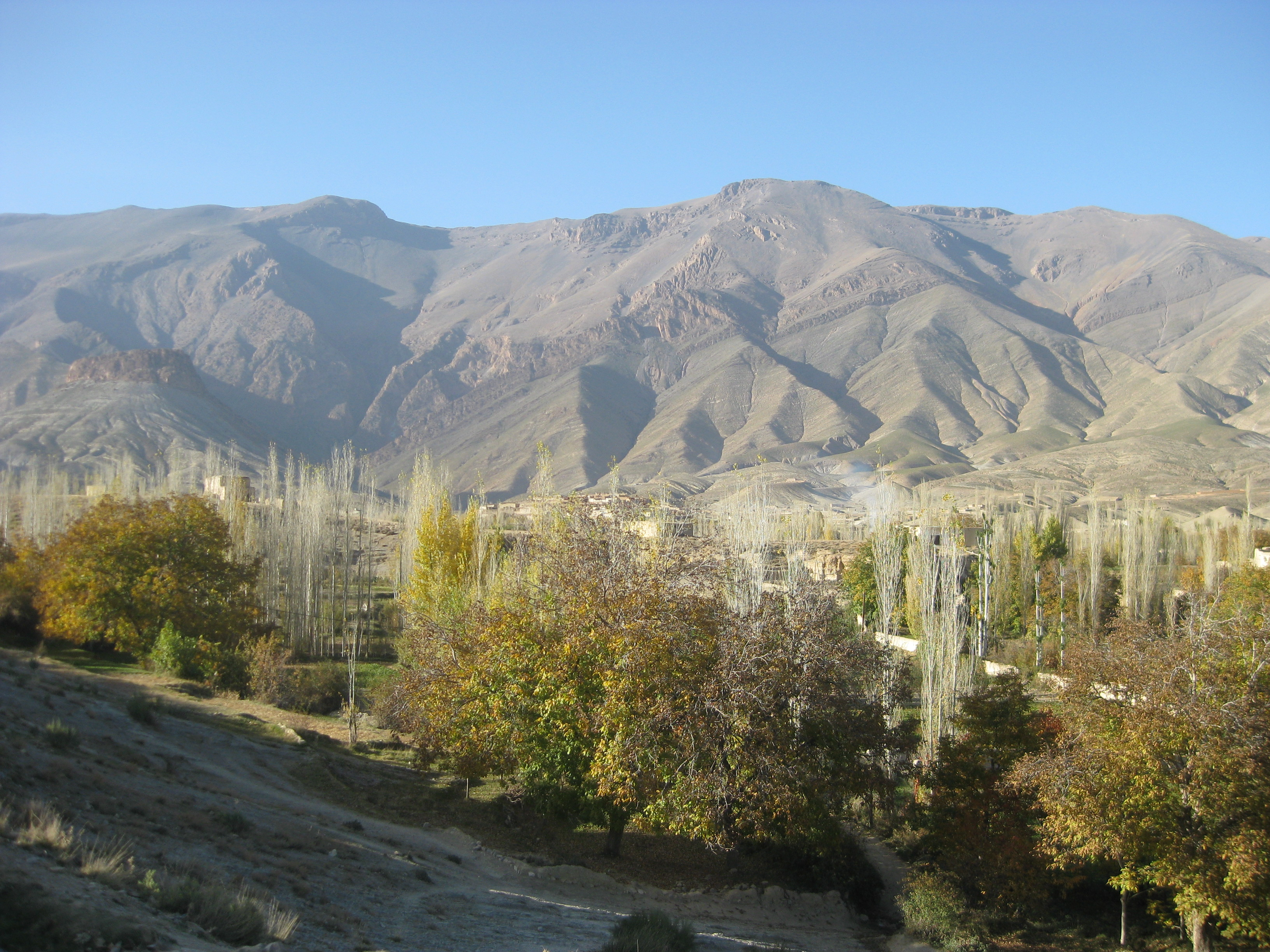
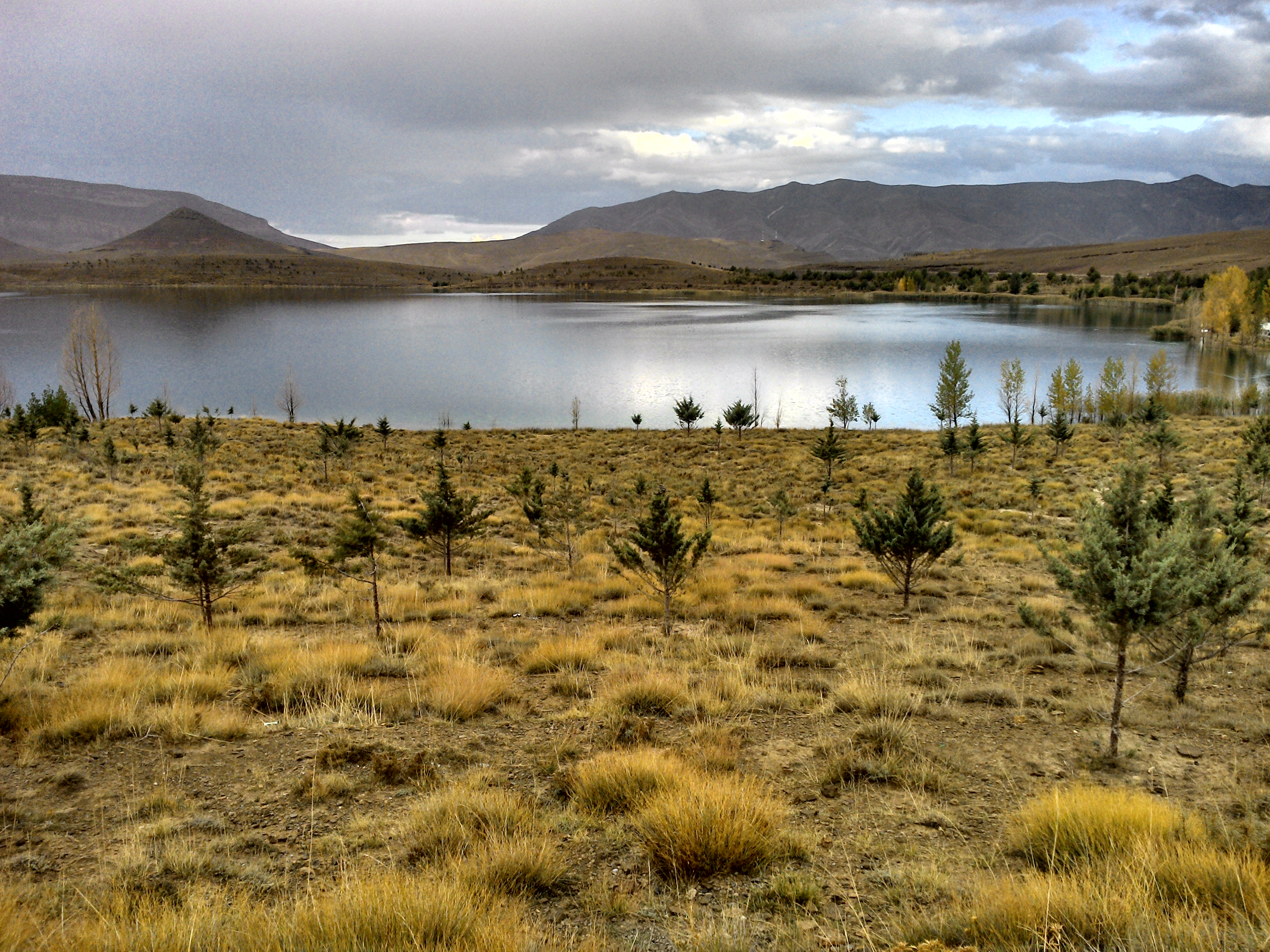
- Zaouit sidi hamza, upper Ziz River valley Tislit Lake, Imilchil Tounfit in winter
- Interactive map of Midelt Province
- Country: Morocco
- Region: Drâa-Tafilalet
- Seat: Midelt

Population (2024)
  - Total: 313,769

Midelt (Arabic: ميدلت, Standard Moroccan Tamazight: ⵎⵉⴷⵍⵜ) is a Province in the Moroccan economic Region of Drâa-Tafilalet. It was created in 2009 from parts of the provinces of Khénifra and Errachidia. Its namesake and centre of administration is the city of Midelt.

The Province is famous for its apples, Morocco is the 18th-biggest apple-producing country, With nearly 90% of output coming from Midelt Province Smallholders

The major cities are:

- Boumia
- Er-Rich
- Midelt

== Subdivisions ==
Communes of Midelt Province

The province is divided administratively into the following municipalities and rural communes:

=== Rural communes ===
Name	Geographic code	Households (2024)	Population (2024)	Notes
Aghbalou	363.05.01.	2606	10296	Urban centre: Aghbalou Nssardane (3,219 inhabitants; 917 households)
Agoudim	363.17.03.	762	3826	
Ait Ayach	363.07.05.	2773	12932	
Ait Ben Yacoub	363.07.07.	1044	3743	
Ait Izdeg	363.07.09.	1642	7794	
Ait Yahya	363.15.01.	763	4293	
Amersid	363.07.11.	1356	6023	
Amouguer	363.15.03.	888	4363	
Anemzi	363.17.13.	1022	5140	
Bou Azmou	363.15.05.	2026	10100	
En-Nzala	363.09.01.	1012	4873	
Gourrama	363.09.03.	3379	15952	Urban centre: Gourrama (8,829 inhabitants; 1,998 households)
Guers Tiaallaline	363.09.05.	3106	15019	
Guir	363.09.07.	929	4363	
Imilchil	363.15.07.	2056	9164	
Itzer	363.07.17.	2946	10513	Urban centre: Itzer (5,700 inhabitants; 1,709 households)
Mibladen	363.07.19.	739	3052	
M'Zizel	363.09.09.	1561	7502	
Outerbat	363.15.09.	1372	6763	
Sidi Aayad	363.09.11.	2440	11562	
Sidi Yahya Ou Youssef	363.05.21.	1109	4877	
Tanourdi	363.05.23.	621	2834	
Tizi N'Ghachou	363.05.25.	627	2836	
Tounfite	363.17.27.	3301	13424	Urban centre: Tounfite (8,906 inhabitants; 2,354 households)
Zaida	363.07.29.	3696	14454	Urban centre: Zaida (8,503 inhabitants; 2,234 households)
Zaouiat Sidi Hamza	363.09.13.	934	5248	

=== Municipalities ===
Name	Geographic code	Households (2024)	Population (2024)	Notes
Boumia	363.01.15.	5879	21713	Urban centre: Boumia (19,433 inhabitants; 5,347 households)
Er-Rich	363.01.07.	6894	28462	
Midelt	363.01.03.	16225	62648	
