= Aghbalou =

Aghbalou may refer to:

- Aghbalou, Algeria
- Aghbalou, Morocco
