= WASP-161 =

Star in the constellation Puppis

Observation data Epoch J2000 Equinox J2000
- Constellation: Puppis
- Right ascension: 08^{h} 25^{m} 21.08369^{s}
- Declination: −11° 30′ 03.5522″
- Apparent magnitude (V): 11.08

Characteristics
- Evolutionary stage: main sequence
- Spectral type: F6

Astrometry
Radial velocity (R_{v})	38.72±0.41 km/s
Proper motion (μ)	RA: -5.431 mas/yr Dec.: -0.496 mas/yr
Parallax (π)	2.8078±0.0158 mas
Distance	1,162 ± 7 ly (356 ± 2 pc)

Details
Mass	1.39±0.14 M_{☉}
Radius	1.712+0.083 −0.072 R_{☉}
Luminosity	4.44+0.56 −0.48 L_{☉}
Surface gravity (log g)	4.111+0.023 −0.033 cgs
Temperature	6400±100 K
Metallicity [Fe/H]	+0.16±0.09 dex
Rotational velocity (v sin i)	18±0.8 km/s

Other designations
- Tislit, BD−11 2350, TOI-1912, TIC 50712784, WASP-161, TYC 5435-1109-1

Database references
SIMBAD	data
Exoplanet Archive	data

WASP-161, also named Tislit, is an F-type main-sequence star about 1,162 light-years (356 parsecs) away in the constellation Puppis. With an apparent magnitude of 11.1, it is much too faint to be visible to the naked eye. It hosts one known exoplanet.

== Nomenclature ==
The designation WASP-161 comes from the Wide Angle Search for Planets.

This was one of the systems selected to be named in the 2019 NameExoWorlds campaign during the 100th anniversary of the IAU, which assigned each country a star and planet to be named. This system was assigned to Morocco; it was chosen because it hosts the first exoplanet with a discovery team led by a Moroccan astronomer. The approved names were Tislit for the star and Isli for the planet; they are named after the Tislit and Isli lakes in the Atlas Mountains of Morocco, near Imilchil. The names mean bride and groom in the Amazigh language, in reference to a heartbroken couple of local legend.

== Planetary system ==
The planet WASP-161b, later named Isli, is a massive hot Jupiter, discovered using the transit method as part of the Wide Angle Search for Planets (WASP). The discovery team, led by Khalid Barkaoui of Cadi Ayyad University, used other telescopes, including TRAPPIST-North at the Oukaïmeden Observatory, TRAPPIST-South, and SPECULOOS-South, to confirm the planet initially detected by WASP. The discovery was announced in 2018 along with two other planets, around the stars WASP-163 and WASP-170.

A 2022 study reported evidence for transit-timing variations of WASP-161b, possibly due to orbital decay or precession, but this was not confirmed by a subsequent study in 2023.

The WASP-161 planetary system
Companion (in order from star)	Mass	Semimajor axis (AU)	Orbital period (days)	Eccentricity	Inclination	Radius
b / Isli	2.49±0.21 M_{J}	0.0673±0.0023	5.4060425(48)	—	89.01+0.69 −1.0°	1.143+0.065 −0.058 R_{J}
