= Boumia =

Boumia may refer to:

- Boumia, Algeria
- Boumia, Morocco
