= Tanourdi =

- commune
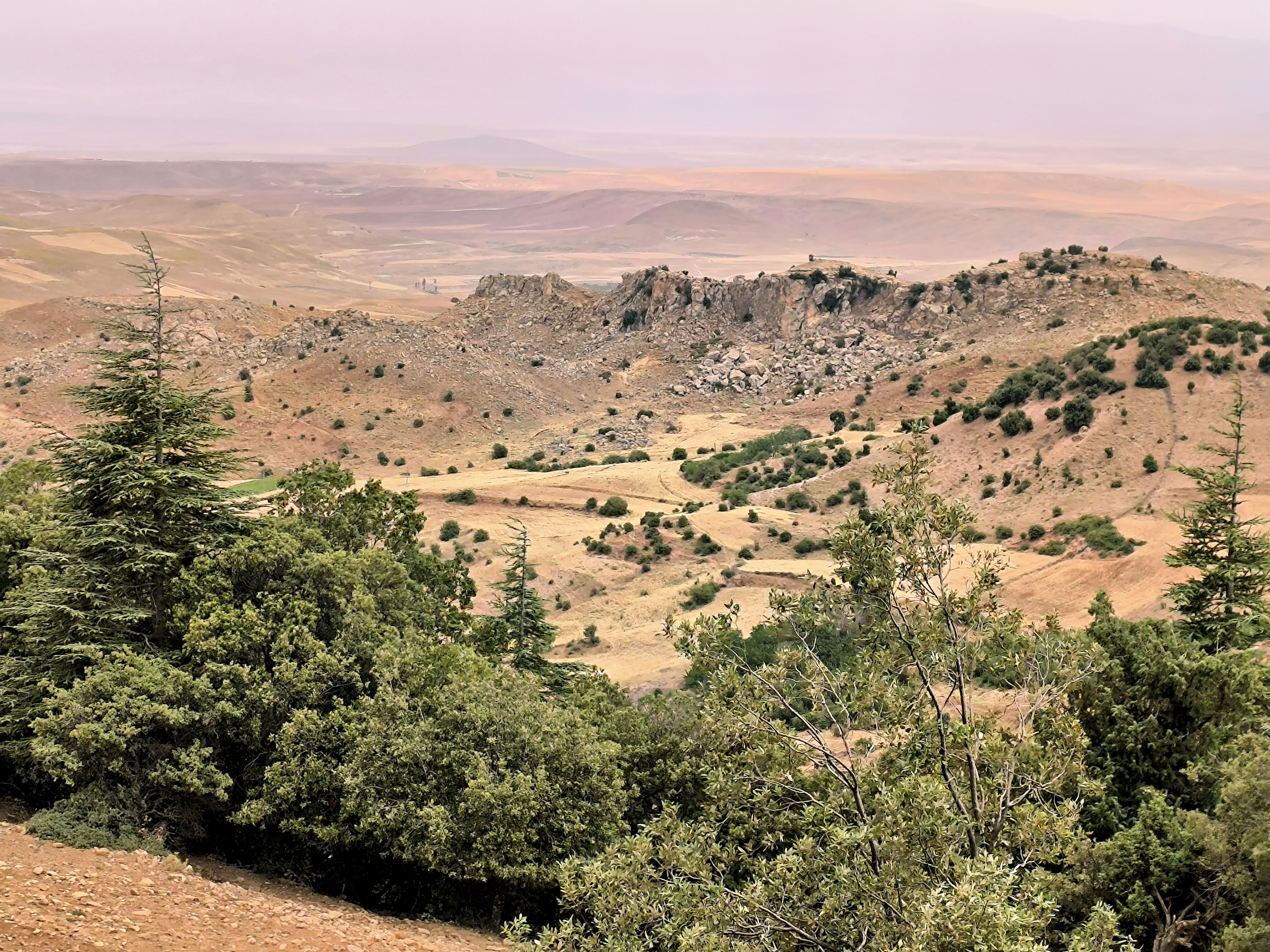

- Location within Morocco
- Coordinates: 32.8251°N 5.1478°W
- Country: Morocco
- Region: Drâa-Tafilalet
- Province: Midelt

Population (2004)
  - Total: 2,777
- Time zone: UTC+0 (GMT)

Tanourdi is a commune in Midelt Province of the Drâa-Tafilalet administrative region of Morocco. At the time of the 2004 census, the commune had a total population of 2777 people living in 416 households.
