= Zaida, Morocco =

Zaida
- Town
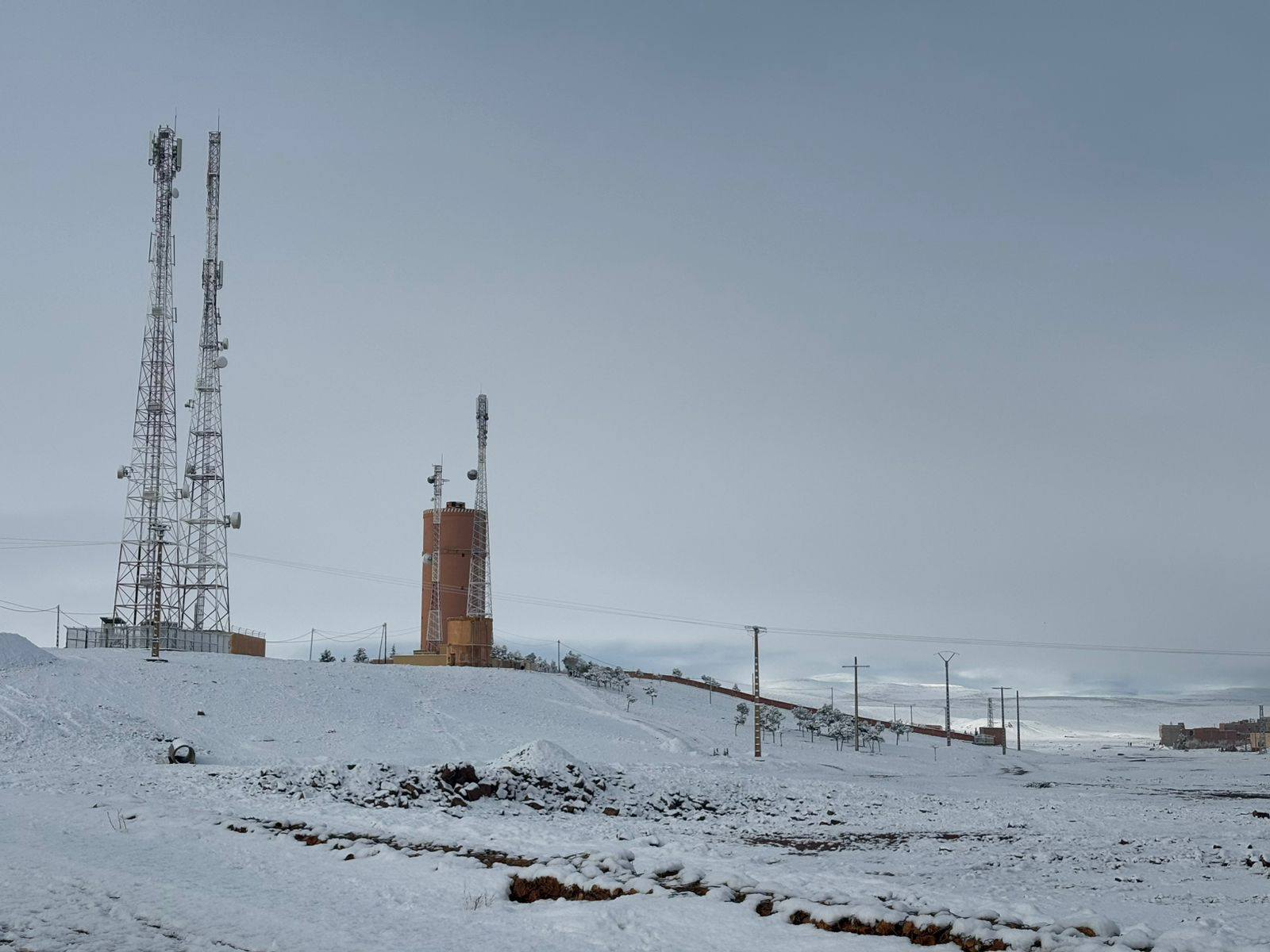
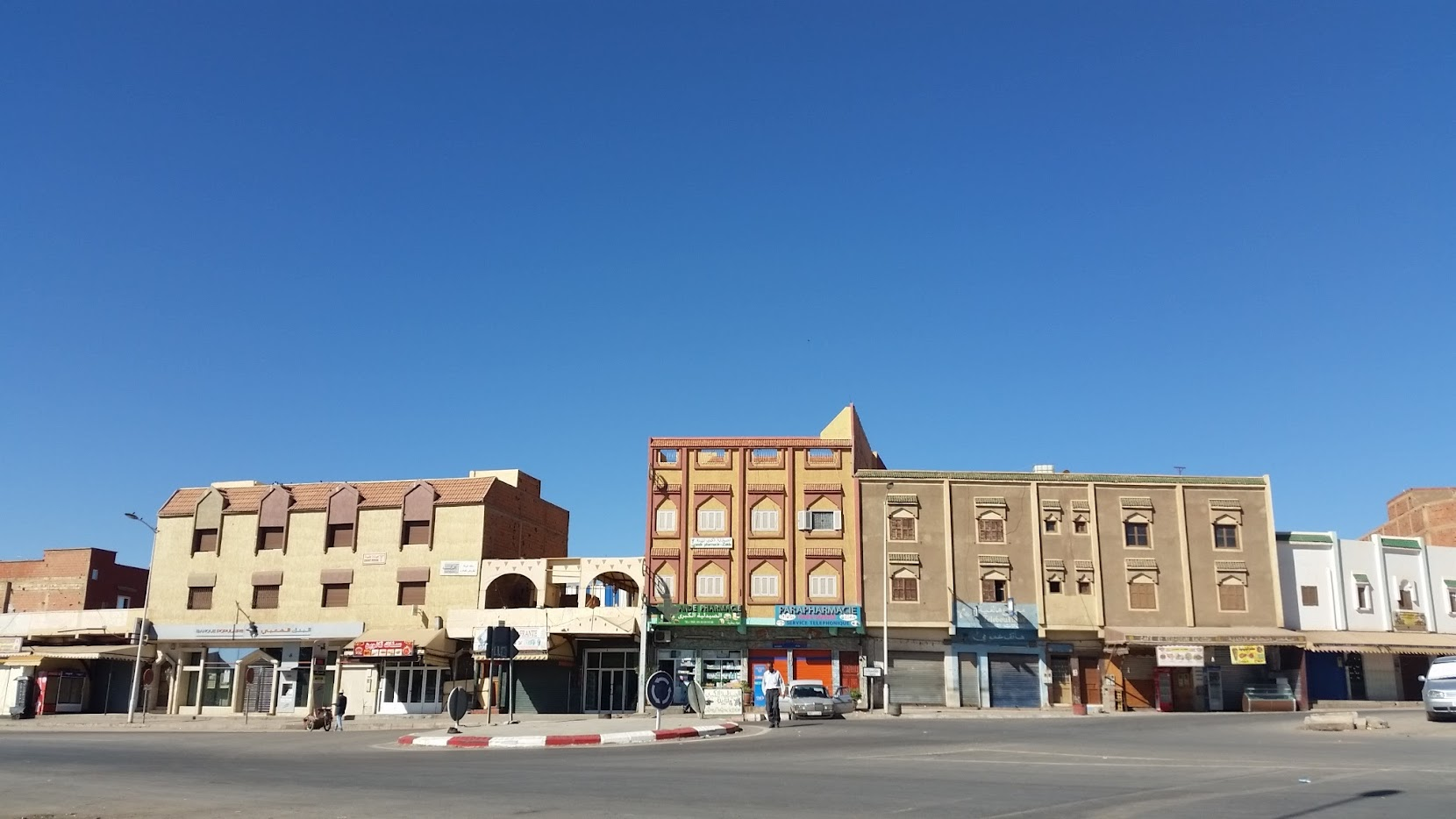
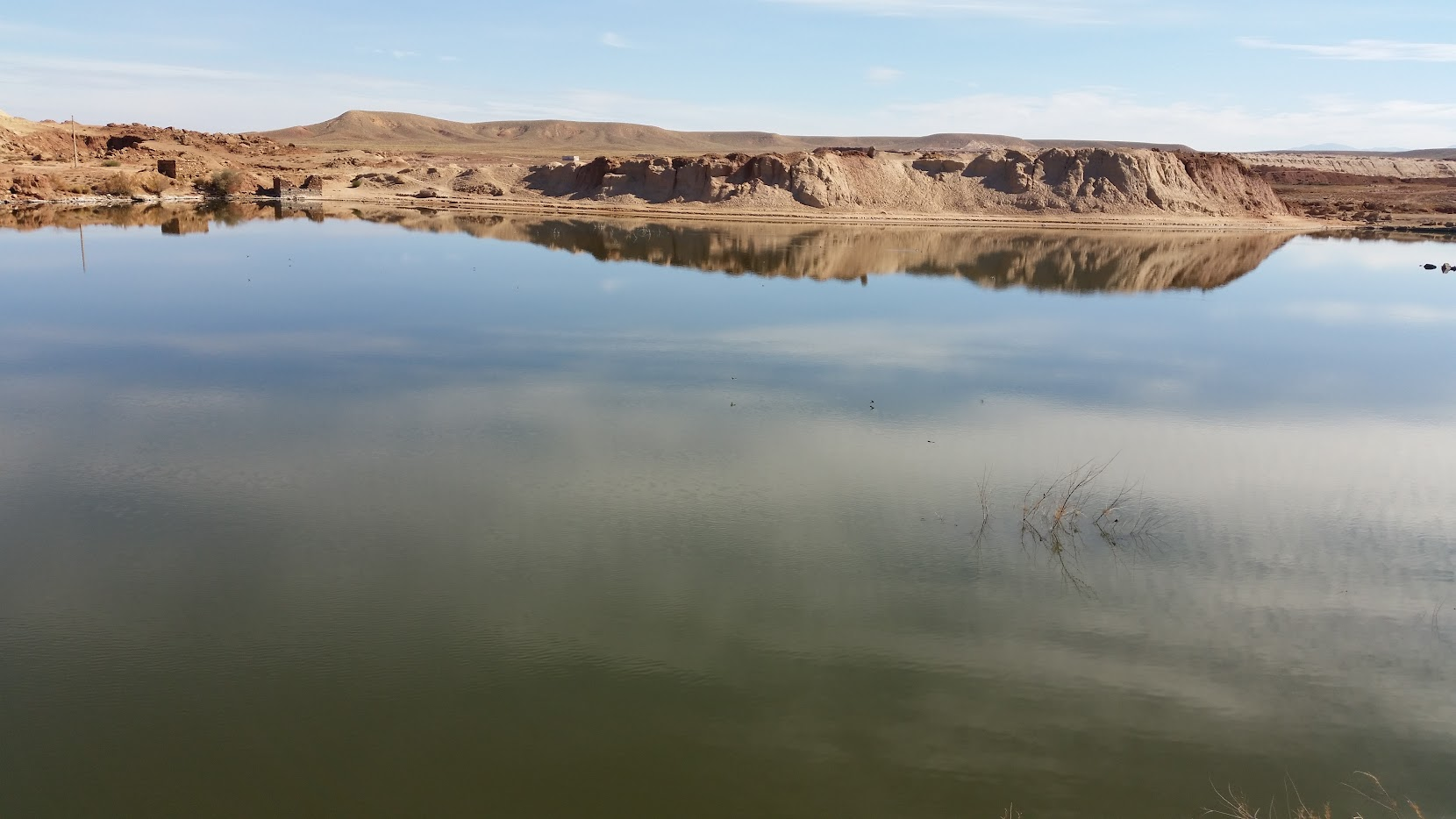
- Interactive map of Zaida
- Coordinates: 32°49′N 4°57′W
- Country: Morocco
- Region: Drâa-Tafilalet
- Province: Midelt Province
- Elevation: 4,783 ft (1,458 m)

Population (2024)
  - Total: 14,449
- Time zone: UTC+0 (GMT)
- Postal code: 54375

Zaida (in Berber: ⵣⴰⵢⴷⴰ, and in Arabic: زايدة) is a Berber village in the central-western region of Morocco. It is located about 30 kilometers southeast of the city of Midelt and is known for its apple production.

The population of Zaida is approximately 14,449 inhabitants (2024), most of whom are farmers. The village is heavily reliant on agriculture, with inhabitants cultivating apples, olive trees, and cereals.

Zaida is situated at an altitude of 1,458 meters above sea level. The village has a temperate climate, with hot summers and cold winters.

The native language in Zaida is Central Atlas Tamazight.

== Demographics ==
Population Growth of Zaida from 1994 to 2024
Year	Population	Source
1994	3760	
2004	4968	
2014	13181	·
2024	14449	

== Apple Cultivation ==
For a long time, this village has been known for its apple cultivation. At the beginning of commercial apple cultivation, the main brand was called Baldi. With the rise of agriculture in Morocco, new apple varieties have been imported, which yield results as good as in their countries of origin. Today, several dozen varieties of apples are produced, including Gala Royale, Gala Mondiale, Delicious, Golden, Star, Terbana, Bouzgoudou, Zirzima, Hana, and Baldi.

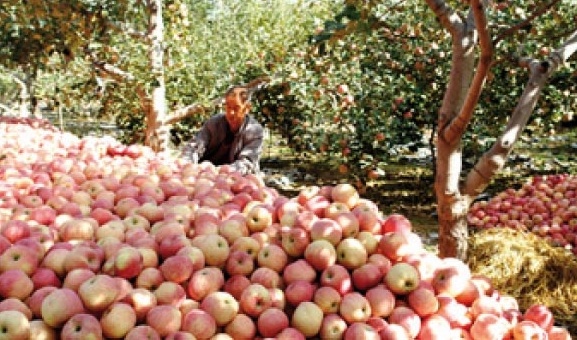
Gala Royale

== Zaida: A Stopover for Travelers ==
Zaida is located on National Road N13, at the intersection with National Road N29. It is called "the gateway to the Sahara" because travelers heading to the Sahara pass through this town, especially tourists visiting Merzouga and the Tafilalet region.

Thanks to its geographic location, Zaida has become a stop where drivers and travelers pause for a break. It features shops such as fruit and dried fruit stalls, as well as restaurants serving grilled dishes.

== History ==
Zaida is a relatively new town, located at the crossroads of two national roads (RN 13 and RN 33), and it is also traversed by the famous Moulouya River. Its establishment dates back to the installation of mining companies in the 20th centuryth century. Before the arrival of these companies, the town consisted of various Amazigh tribes (Ait Ala Omimoun, Ait Ouloussan, Ait Ighrbin, Ait Ghyat, etc.).

== Gallery and Photos ==
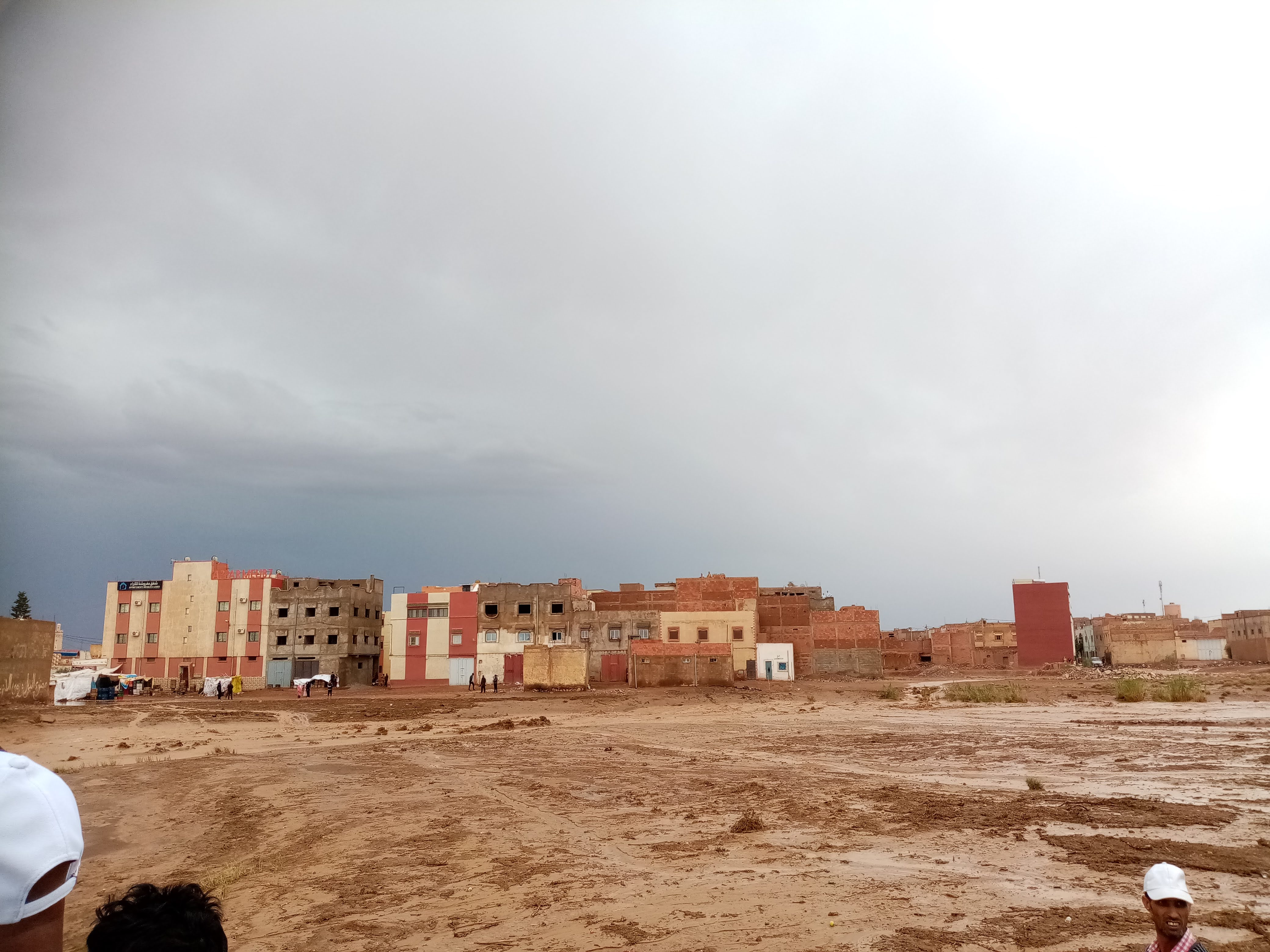
Aida Bouhafs summer 2024

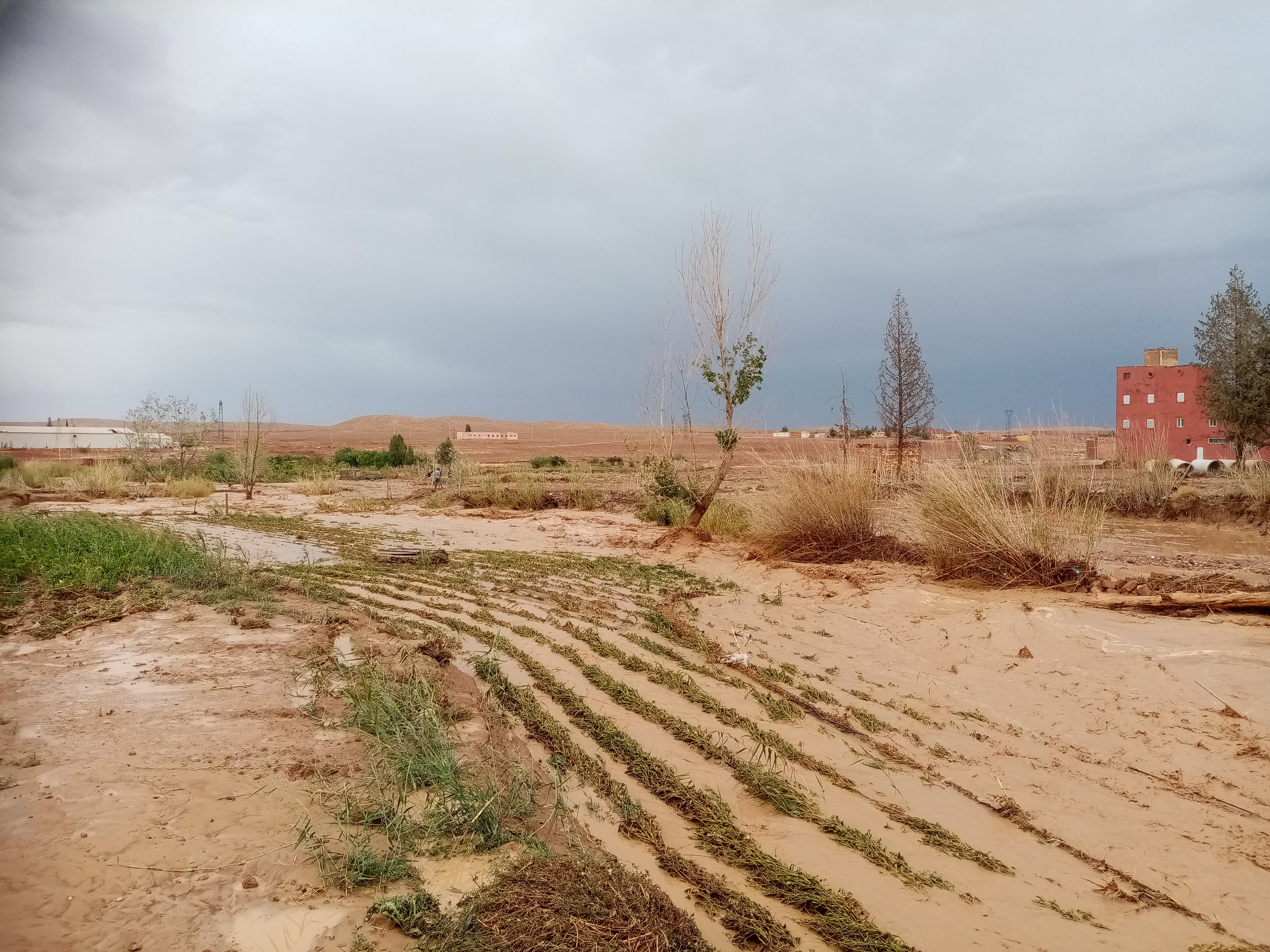
Zaida Bouhafs summer 2024

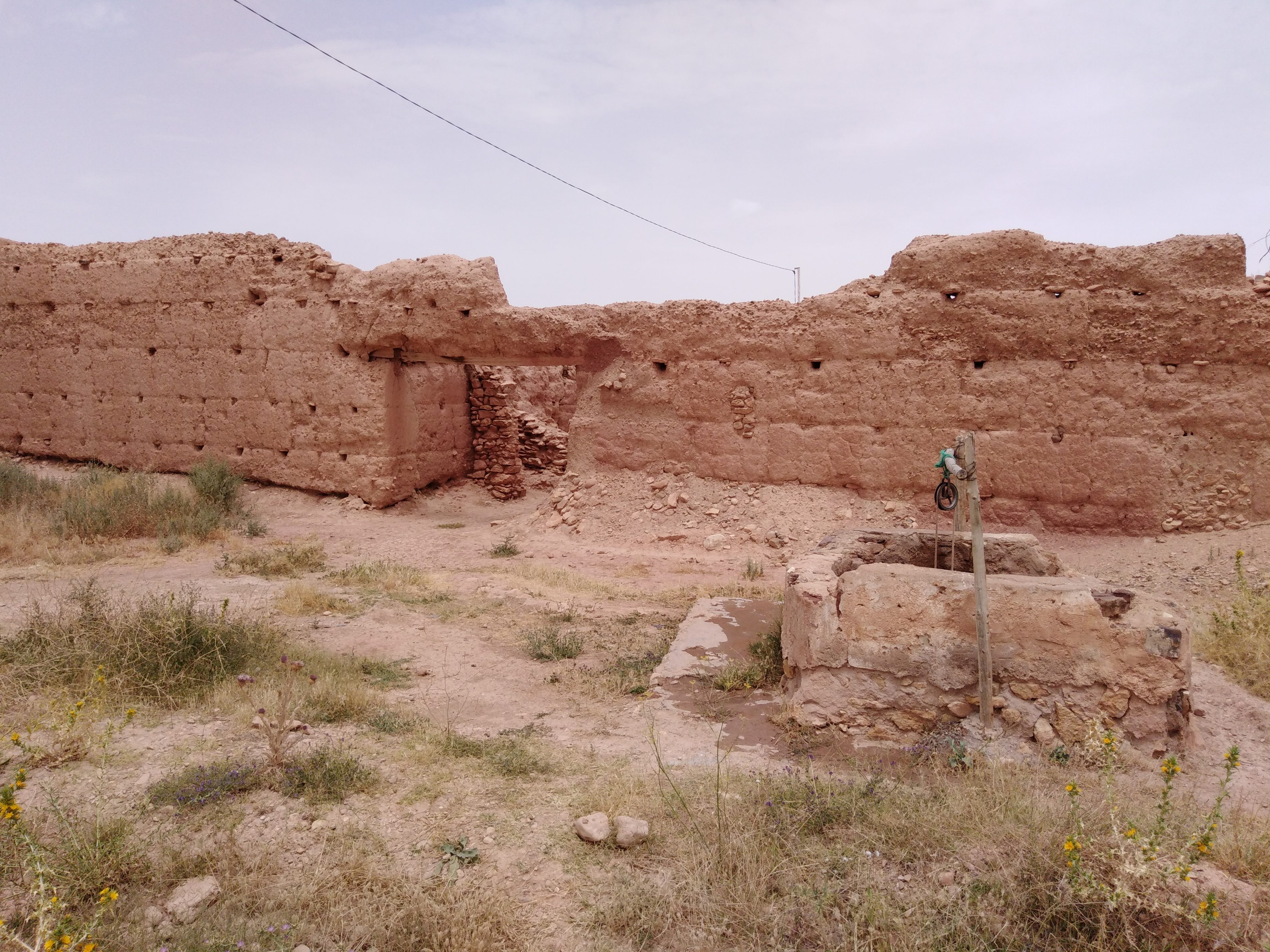
Zaida Douar Ait Bnicho

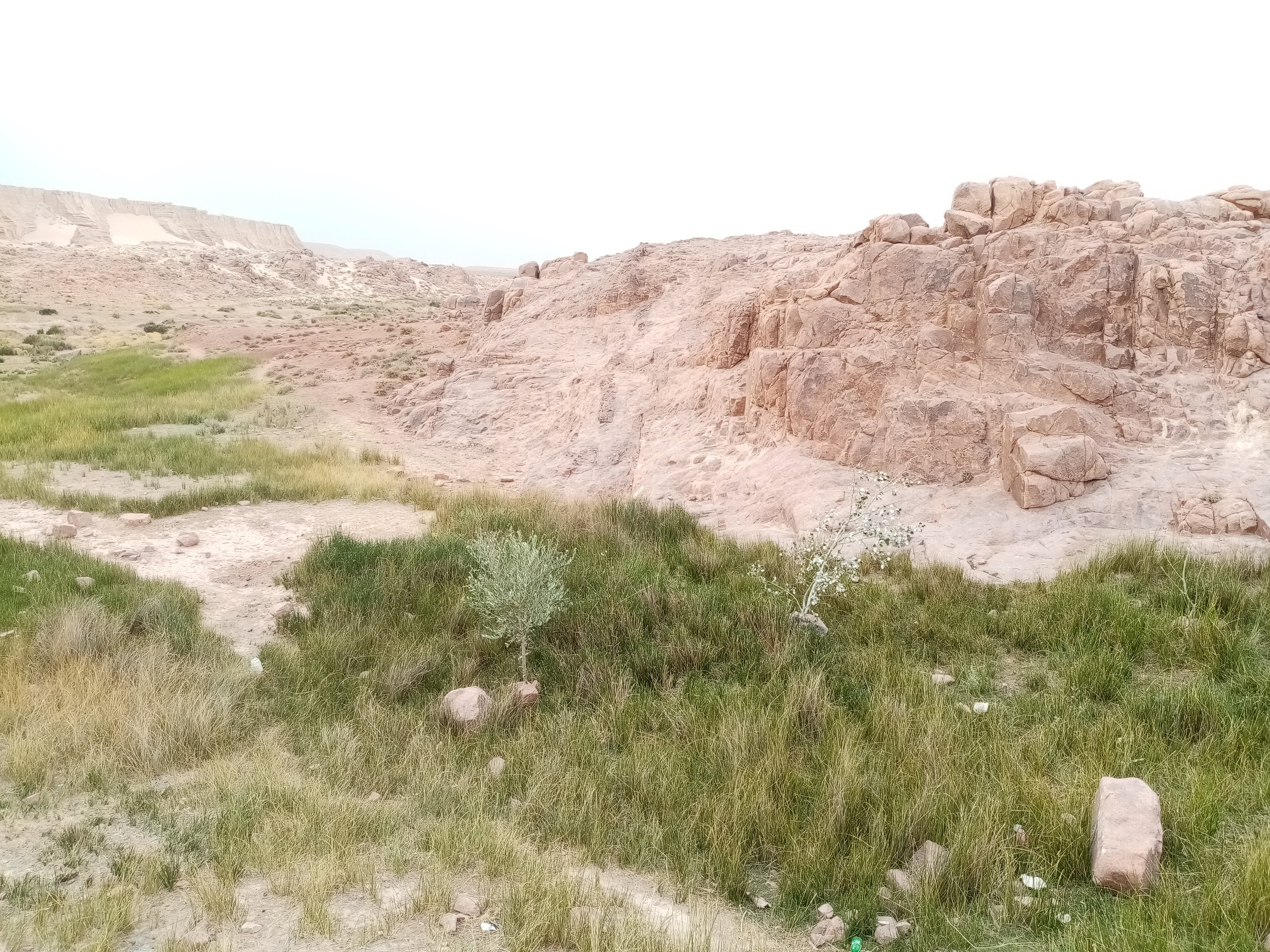
Aouinat Tlaia water source

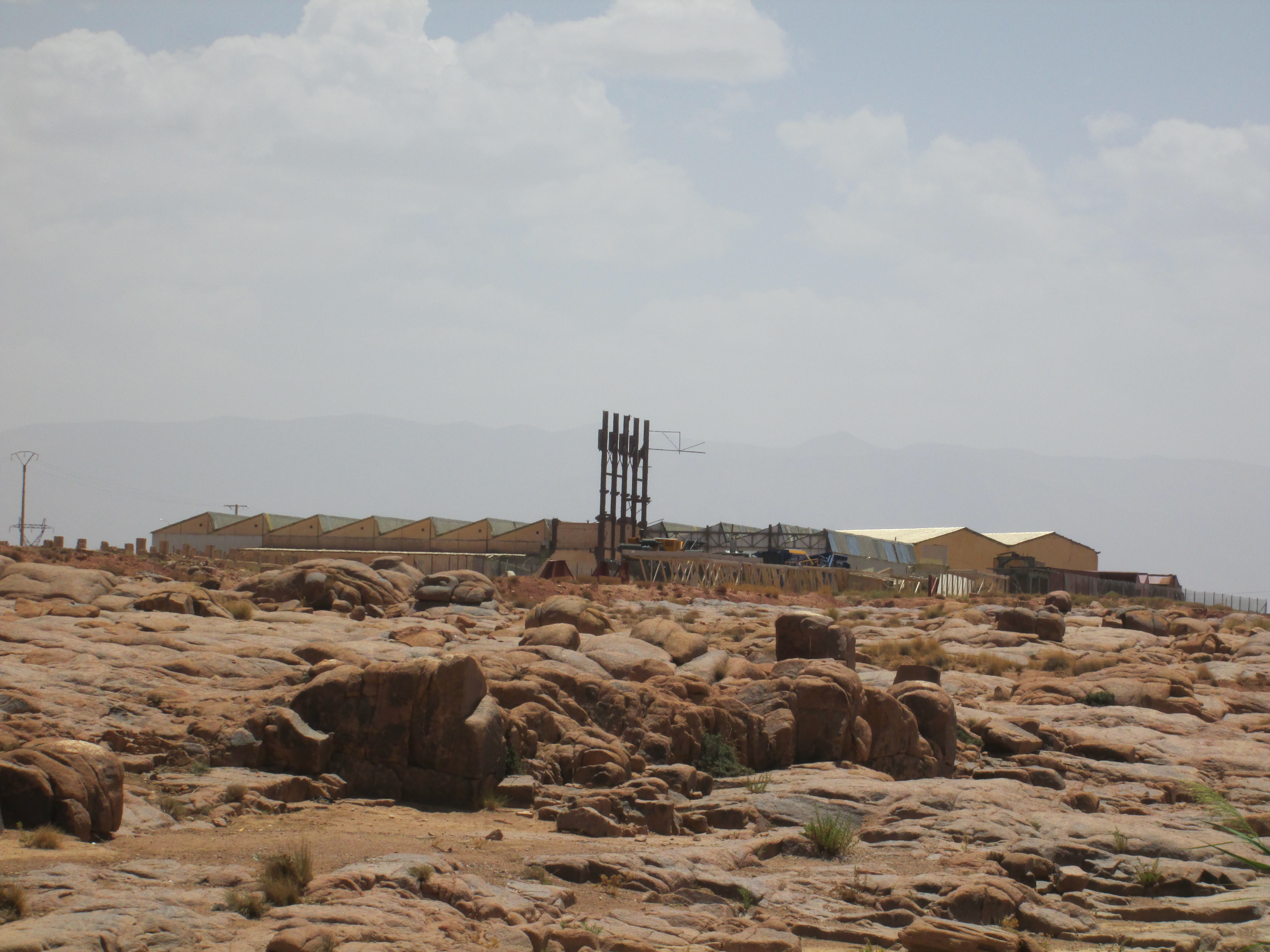
Zaïda Mines

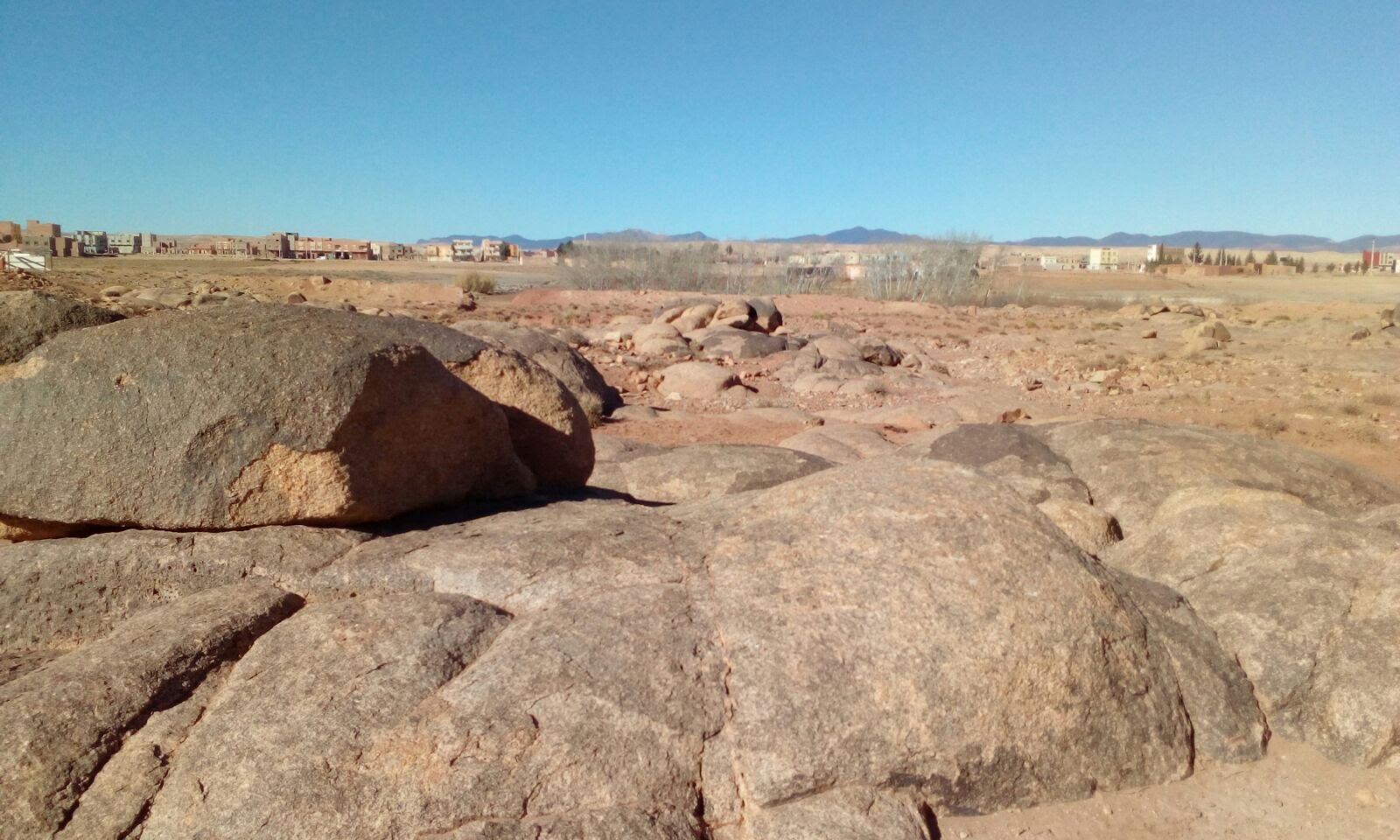
Zaida granite

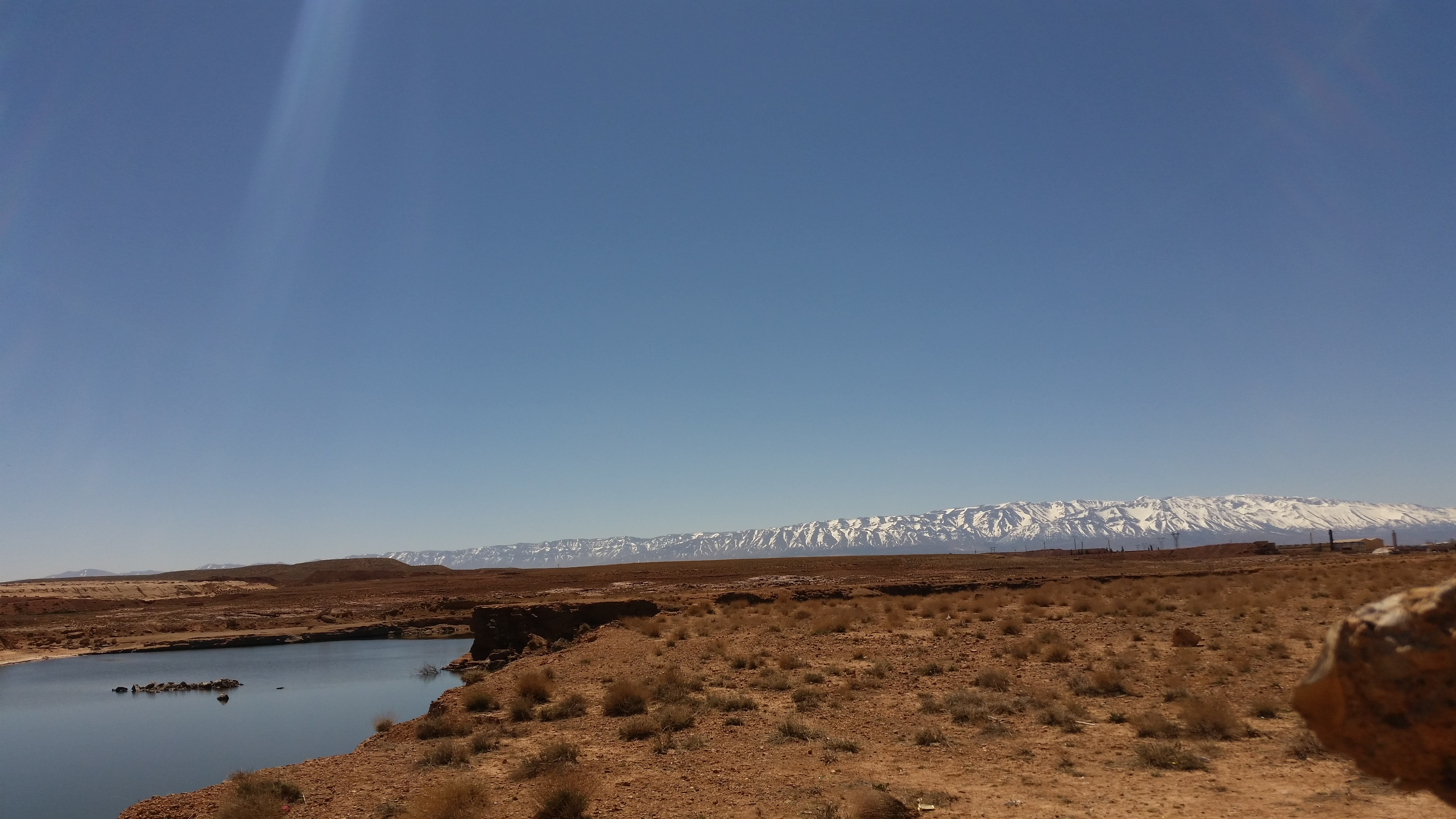
Zaida panoramic view Khatouch

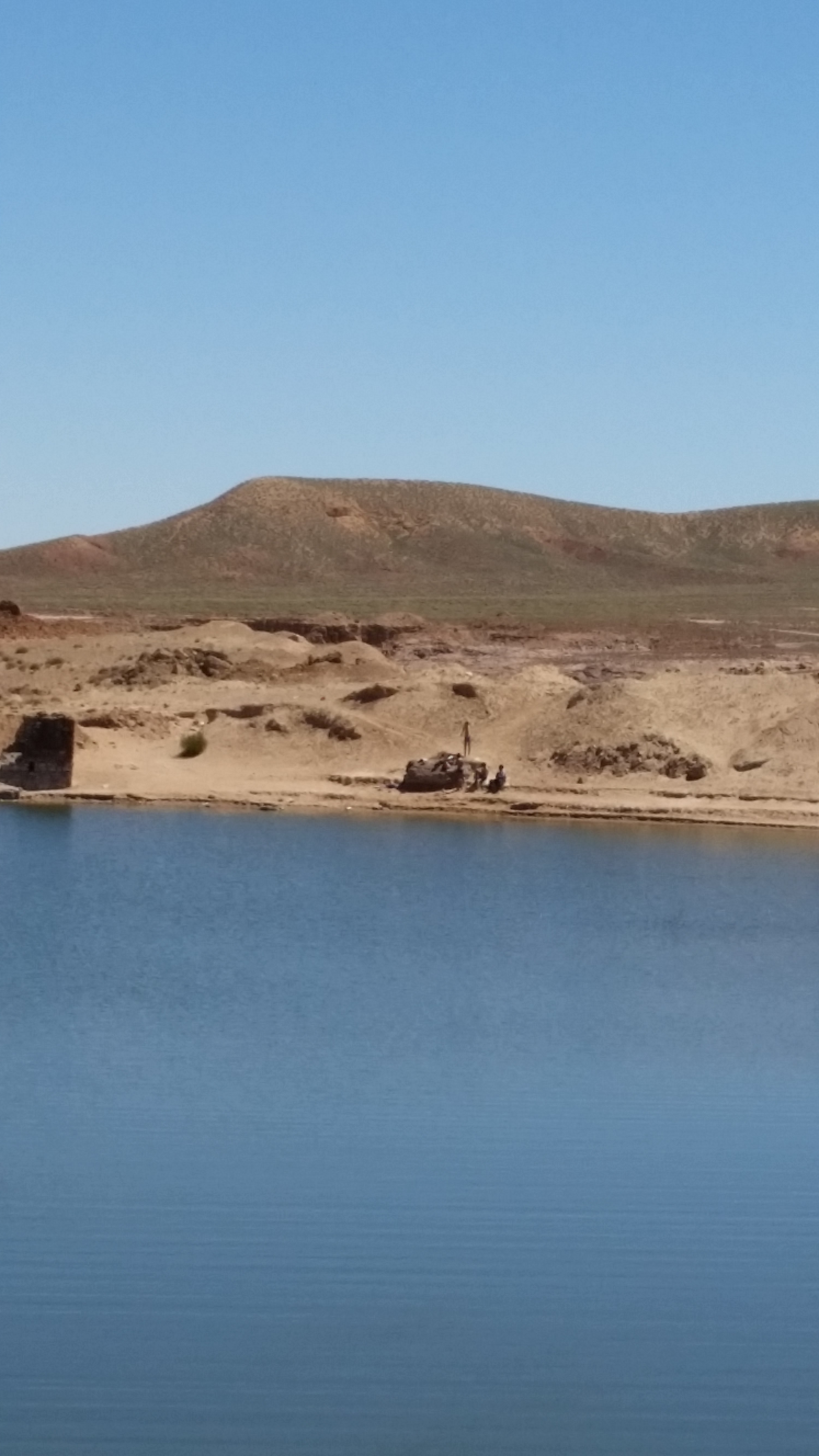
Zaida panoramic view Khatouch (second view)

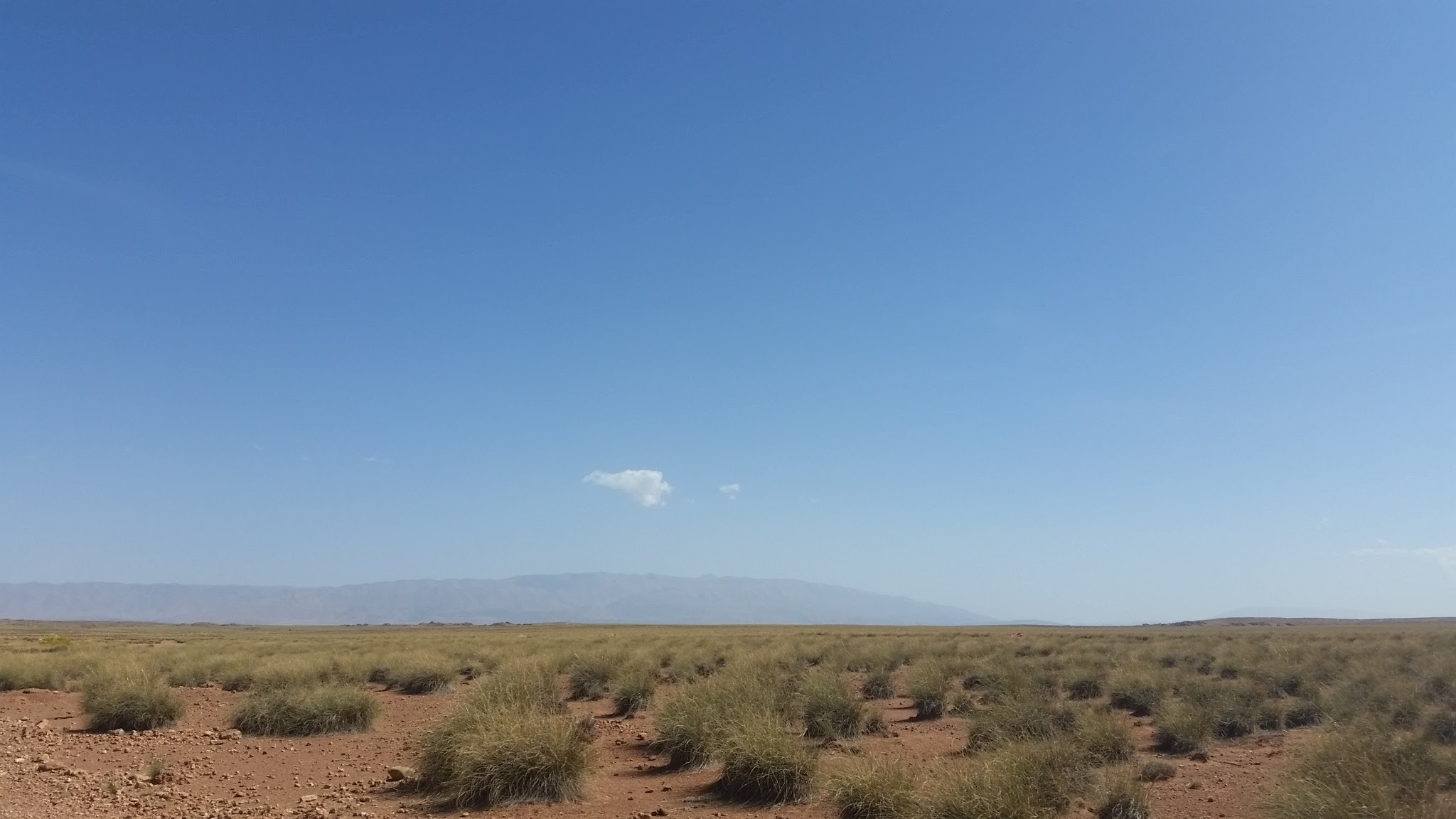
Zaida Gadim

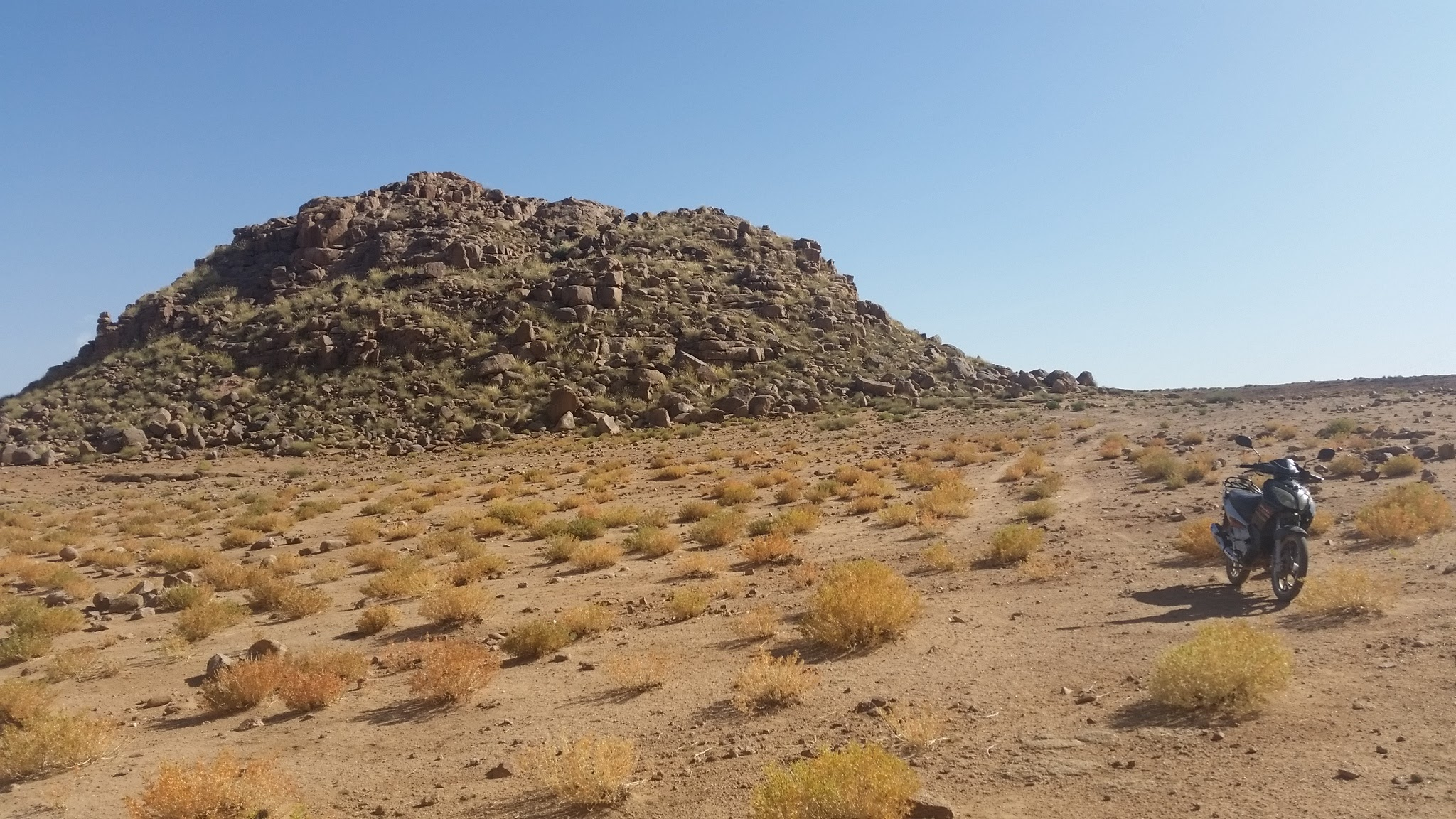
Zaida Gniouichan

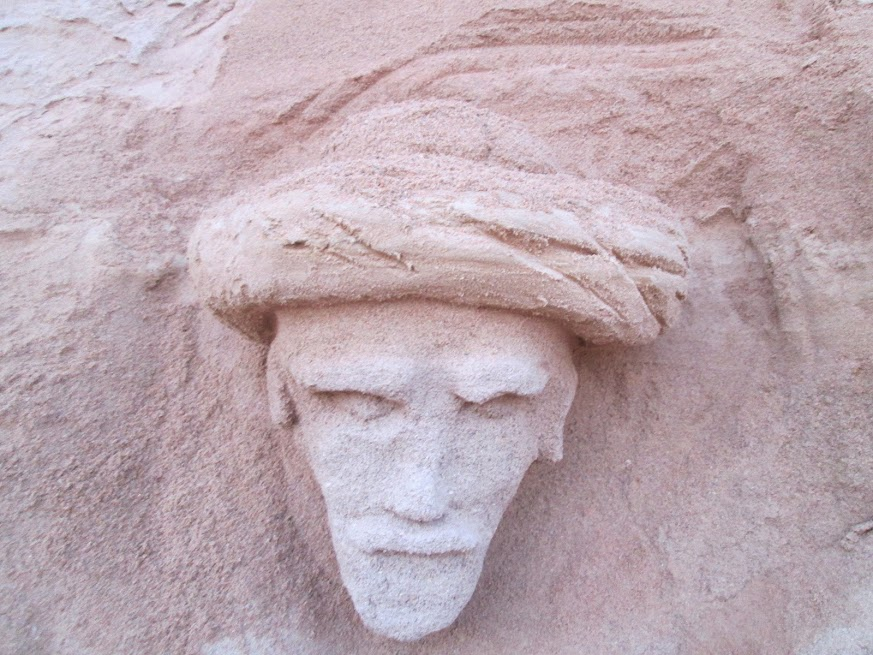
Zaida statue in Adik sand

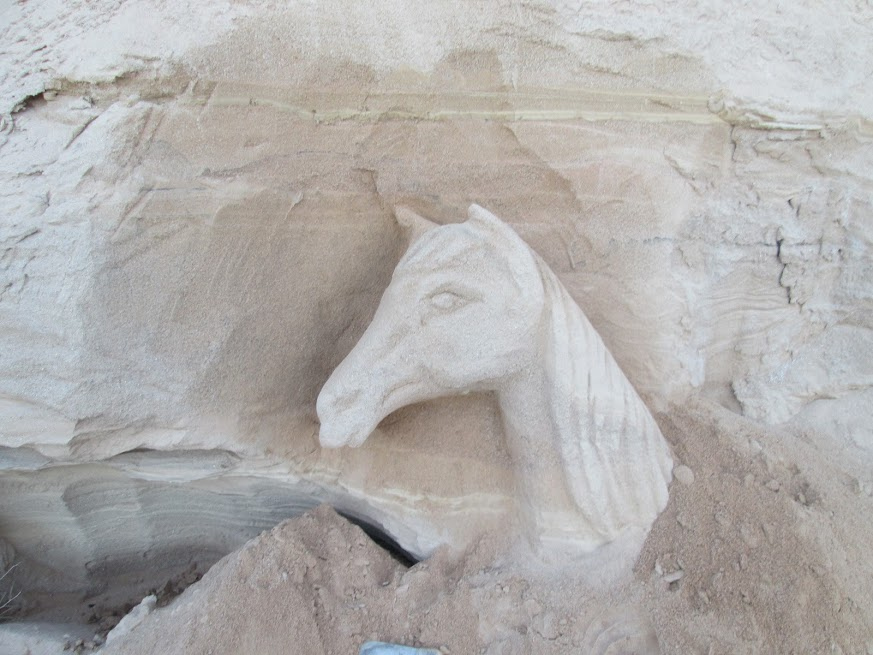
Zaida Adik: horse statue

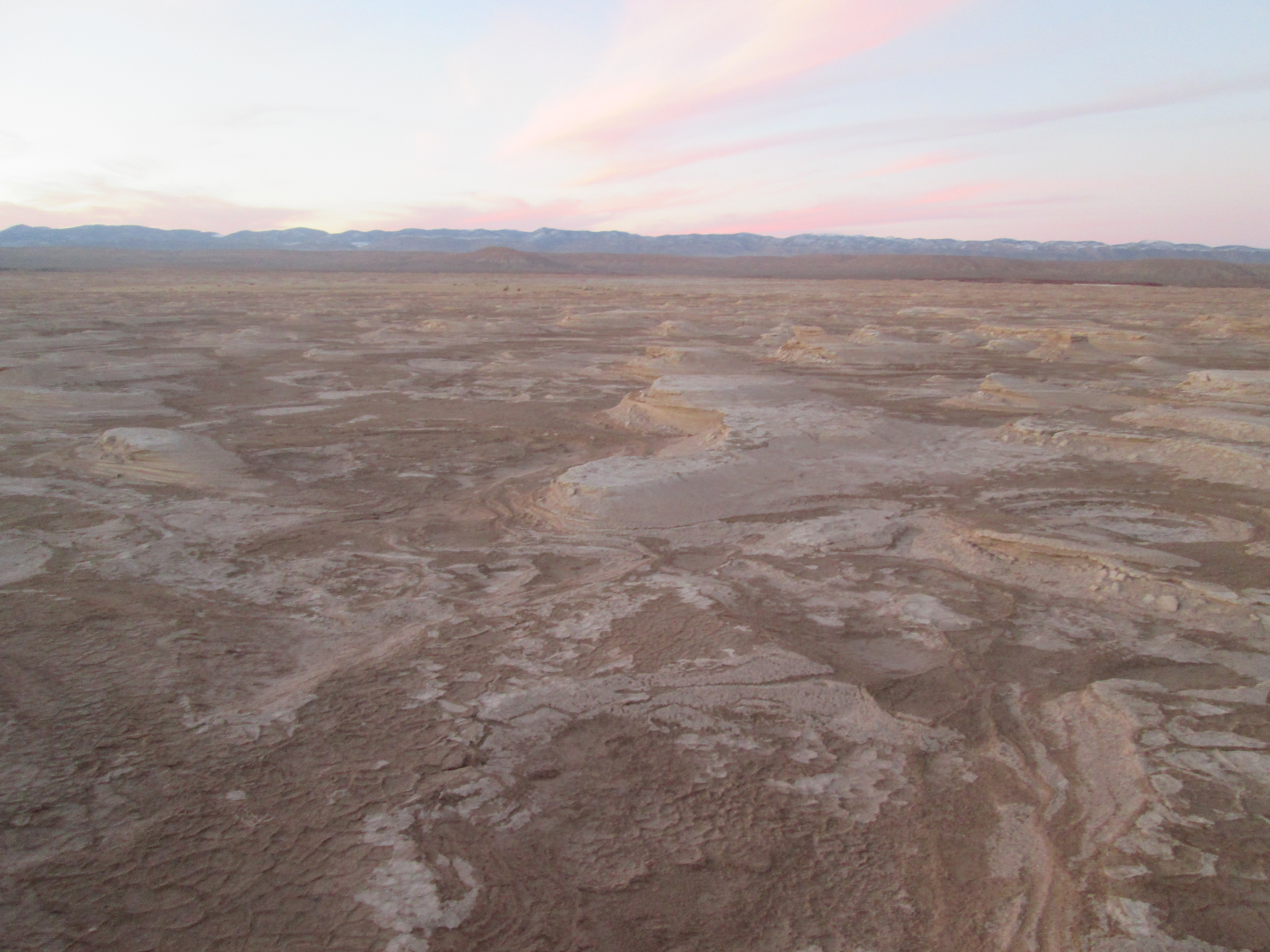
Zaida Adik 1: sand from the old quarry

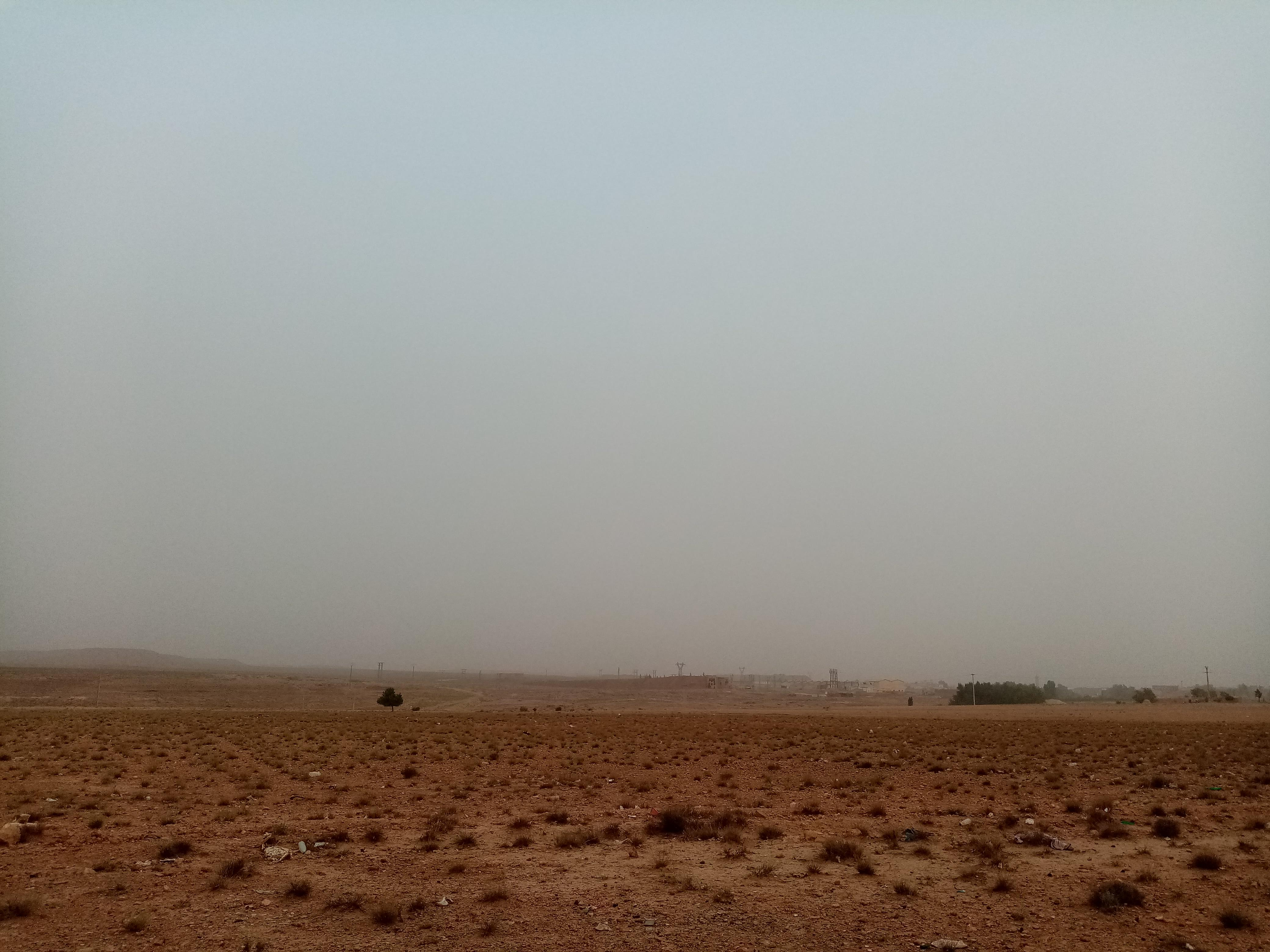
Zaida sandstorm

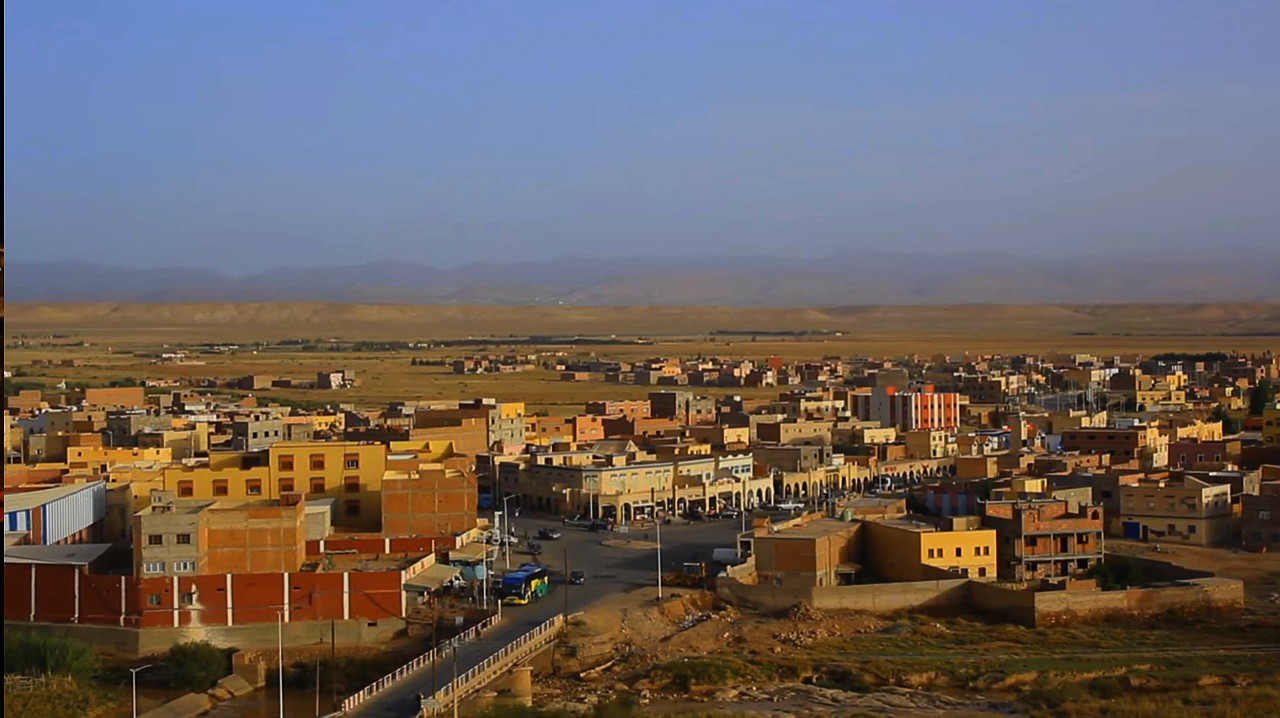
Zaida panoramic view
