= Ait Yahya =

- commune
- Location within Morocco
- Coordinates: 32°34′00″N 5°34′00″W
- Country: Morocco
- Region: Drâa-Tafilalet
- Province: Midelt

Population (2024)
  - Total: 4,293
- Time zone: UTC+0 (GMT)

Ait Yahya is a commune in Midelt Province of the Drâa-Tafilalet administrative region of Morocco. At the time of the 2024 census, the commune had a total population of 4293 people living in 763 households.
