= Amersid =

- Commune
- Interactive map of Amersid
- Coordinates: 32°45′N 4°28′W
- Country: Morocco
- Region: Drâa-Tafilalet
- Province: Midelt

Population (2004)
  - Total: 6,183
- Time zone: UTC+0 (GMT)

Amersid is a commune in Midelt Province of the Drâa-Tafilalet administrative region of Morocco. At the time of the 2004 census, the commune had a total population of 6,183 people living in 1,117 households.
