= Canadian Express =

1977–1980 Canadian variety TV series

- Genre: Variety television
- Presented by: Ryan's Fancy; Gabrielle; Terry Jacks; Terry David Mulligan; Gerry and Ziz; Jim Bennet
- Country of origin: Canada
- Original language: English
- No. of seasons: 3

Production
- Executive producer: Paddy Sampsson
- Cinematography: Tom Gordon
- Running time: 60 minutes

Original release
- Network: CBC
- Release: September 22, 1977 – September 12, 1980

Canadian Express is a Canadian variety television series that aired on CBC Television between September 22, 1977, and September 12, 1980. The show was hosted by Ryan's Fancy in St. John's, Newfoundland and Labrador, Gabrielle in Edmonton, Alberta, Terry Jacks in Toronto, Ontario, Terry David Mulligan in Vancouver, British Columbia, Gerry and Ziz in Winnipeg, Manitoba, and Jim Bennet in Halifax, Nova Scotia. It was executive produced by Paddy Sampson.
