= Amouguer =

- commune
- Location within Morocco
- Coordinates: 32°16′20″N 4°54′32″W
- Country: Morocco
- Region: Drâa-Tafilalet
- Province: Midelt

Population (2024)
  - Total: 4,362
- Time zone: UTC+0 (GMT)

Amouguer is a commune in Midelt Province of the Drâa-Tafilalet administrative region of Morocco. At the time of the 2024 census, the commune had a total population of 4362 people living in 888 households.
