= Haut Atlas Oriental National Park =

National park in Morocco

- IUCN category II (national park)
- Location within Morocco
- Location: Morocco
- Coordinates: 32°15′N 5°25′W
- Area: 490 km^{2} (190 sq mi)

Ramsar Wetland
- Official name: Lacs Isly-Tislite
- Designated: 15 January 2005
- Reference no.: 1480

Haut Atlas Oriental National Park (French: Parc National du Haut Atlas Oriental) is located in Morocco. It covers 49,000 hectares (120,000 acres) in and near the eastern High Atlas mountains. Parts of the park have been designated as a protected Ramsar site since 2005. The park was established to preserve cultural values along with its natural ones.

== Geography ==
High and Middle Atlas; the park is to the left of the center of the map

This site covers 55,252 ha of the High Atlas between Beni Mellal and Er Rachidia. The base rock consists of limestone with some igneous intrusions. The site ranges in altitude from 1,645 m in the bed of the Oued Arheddou to 3,102 m at the summit of Jbel Tanrhourt. At its western end it includes the twin lakes of Isli and Tislit, near Imilchil. The northern slopes enjoy an annual precipitation of 400–600 mm, and are consequently well-wooded, while the southern slopes are drier, receiving only 200–300 mm, and are more open. Winter snows are abundant and long-lasting at the higher elevations.

=== Flora and fauna ===
On the northern side, woody vegetation consists of dense cedar (Cedrus atlantica) and pine (Pinus pinaster maghrebiana) forests, oak (Quercus rotundifolia) woodland, open Juniperus thurifera woodland and, at lower altitudes, some Pinus halepensis. The mountain summits and high plateaus support xerophytic steppe vegetation, and there is some grassland in wetter areas. On the southern slopes cedar woodland is disappearing, but sparse oak and pine woodland persists. Steppe vegetation is predominant, dominated by Stipa tenacissima at lower altitudes.

The park has been designated an Important Bird Area (IBA) by BirdLife International because it supports significant populations of Barbary partridges, Levaillant's woodpeckers, subalpine, spectacled and Tristram's warblers, Moussier's redstarts, and black-eared and black wheatears. Notable mammals include Barbary sheep, Cuvier's gazelles and Barbary macaques. Leopards were once present but, with no confirmed records since 1993, may be locally extinct.
