= Tounfit =

- Town
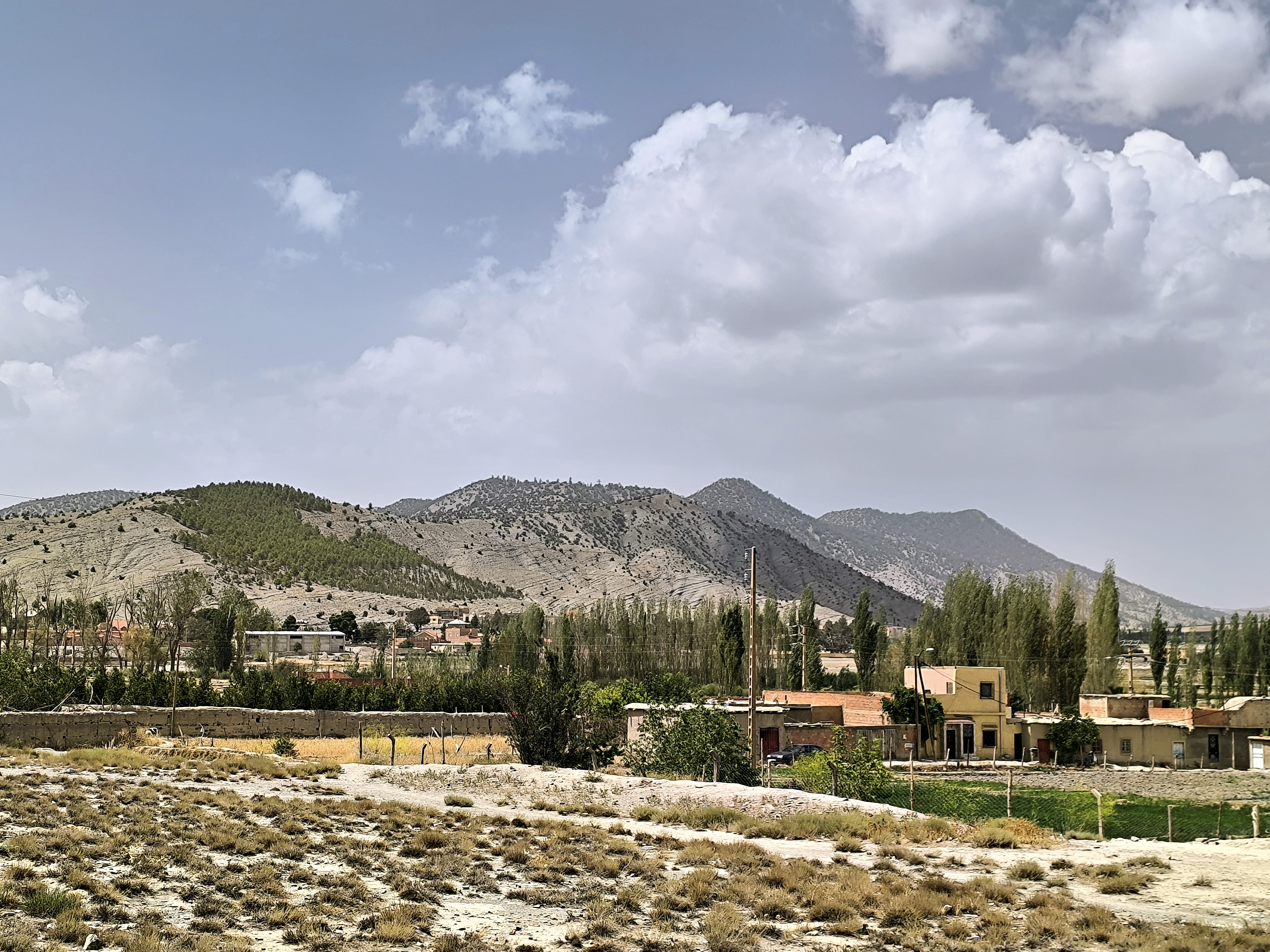
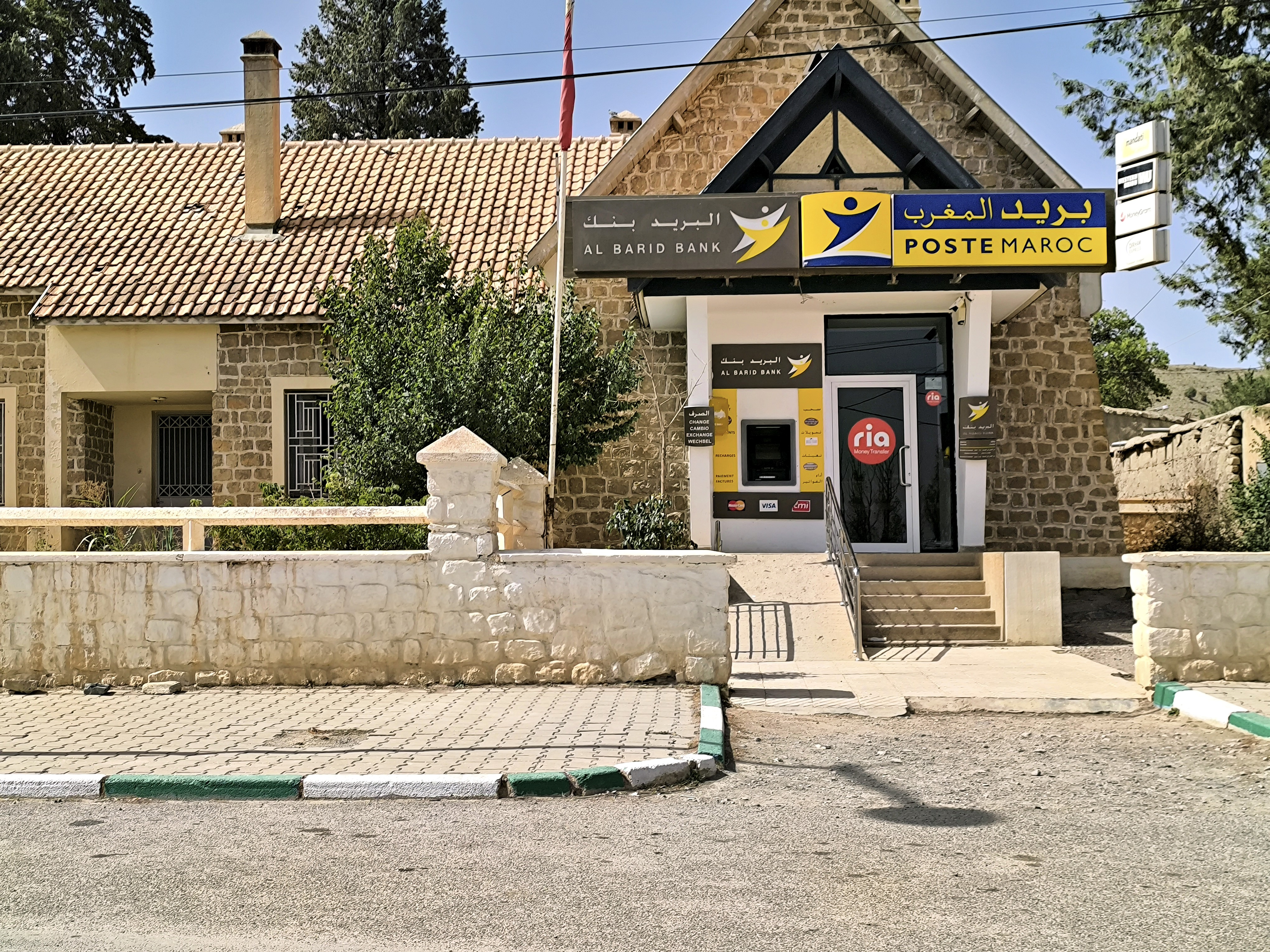
- Interactive map of Tounfit
- Coordinates: 32°28′N 5°14′W
- Country: Morocco
- Region: Drâa-Tafilalet
- Province: Midelt

Population (2004)
  - Total: 7,278
- Time zone: UTC+0 (GMT)

Tounfit is a town in Midelt Province, Drâa-Tafilalet, Morocco. According to the 2004 census it has a population of 7,278.
