= Sidi Yahya Ou Youssef =

Sidi Yahya Ou Youssef wirinne
- commune
- Location within Morocco
- Coordinates: 32°25′N 5°23′W
- Country: Morocco
- Region: Drâa-Tafilalet
- Province: Midelt

Population (2014)
  - Total: 4,637
- Time zone: UTC+0 (GMT)

Sidi Yahya Ou Youssef is a commune in Midelt Province of the Drâa-Tafilalet administrative region of Morocco. At the time of the 2014 census, the commune had a total population of 4637 people living in 942 households.
