= Agoudim =

- commune
- Location within Morocco
- Coordinates: 32.3816°N 5.1788°W
- Country: Morocco
- Region: Drâa-Tafilalet
- Province: Midelt

Population (2004)
  - Total: 4,431
- Time zone: UTC+0 (GMT)

Agoudim is a commune in Midelt Province of the Drâa-Tafilalet administrative region of Morocco. At the time of the 2004 census, the commune had a total population of 4431 people living in 714 households.
