= Guir =

- commune
- Interactive map of Guir
- Coordinates: 32°17′33″N 3°59′22″W
- Country: Morocco
- Region: Drâa-Tafilalet
- Province: Midelt

Population (2024)
  - Total: 4,363
- Time zone: UTC+0 (GMT)

Guir is a commune in Midelt Province of the Drâa-Tafilalet administrative region of Morocco. At the time of the 2024 census, the commune had a total population of 4363 people living in 929 households.
