= Ait Ayach =

- commune
- Location within Morocco
- Coordinates: 32°40′0″N 4°57′20″W
- Country: Morocco
- Region: Drâa-Tafilalet
- Province: Midelt

Population (2004)
  - Total: 11,260
- Time zone: UTC+0 (GMT)

Ait Ayach is a commune in the Midelt Province of the Drâa-Tafilalet administrative region of Morocco. At the time of the 2004 census, the commune had a total population of 11260 people living in 1877 households.
