= Outerbat =

- commune
- Location within Morocco
- Coordinates: 32°29′00″N 4°58′00″W
- Country: Morocco
- Region: Drâa-Tafilalet
- Province: Midelt

Population (2024)
  - Total: 6,763
- Time zone: UTC+0 (GMT)

Outerbat is a commune in Midelt Province of the Drâa-Tafilalet administrative region of Morocco. At the time of the 2024 census, the commune had a total population of 6763 people living in 1372 households.
