= Isli trout =

Conservation status
- Critically Endangered (IUCN 3.1)

Scientific classification
- Kingdom: Animalia
- Phylum: Chordata
- Class: Actinopterygii
- Order: Salmoniformes
- Family: Salmonidae
- Genus: Salmo
- Species: S. viridis

Binomial name
- Salmo viridis Doadrio, Perea & Yahyaoui, 2015

Species of fish

The Isli trout or green trout (Salmo viridis) is a critically endangered trout species, endemic to Lake Isli in Morocco. It is a salmonid fish related to the brown trout. It was described in 2015.

The fish is critically endangered due to overfishing and a lack of environmental protection where it resides.
