= Tizi N'Ghachou =

- Commune
- Location within Morocco
- Coordinates: 32.7750°N 5.2219°W
- Country: Morocco
- Region: Drâa-Tafilalet
- Province: Midelt

Population (2004)
  - Total: 3,053
- Time zone: UTC+0 (GMT)

Tizi N'Ghachou is a commune in Midelt Province of the Drâa-Tafilalet administrative region of Morocco. At the time of the 2004 census, the commune had a total population of 3053 people living in 508 households.
