= Aghbalou, Morocco =

Aghbalou أغبالو
- commune
- Location within Morocco
- Coordinates: 32.6787°N 5.2981°W
- Country: Morocco
- Region: Drâa-Tafilalet
- Province: Midelt

Population (2004)
  - Total: 8,292
- Time zone: UTC+0 (GMT)

Aghbalou is a commune in Midelt Province of the Drâa-Tafilalet administrative region of Morocco. At the time of the 2004 census, the commune had a total population of 8,292 people living in 1,584 households.
