= Imilchil =

Imilchil إيميلشيل / ⵉⵎⵉⵍⵛⵉⵍ
- Interactive map of Imilchil
- Coordinates: 32°9′18″N 5°38′5″W
- Country: Morocco
- Region: Drâa-Tafilalet
- Province: Midelt
- Elevation: 6,952 ft (2,119 m)

Population
  - Total: 1,858
- Time zone: UTC+0 (GMT)

Imilchil or Imilshil (Berber languages: Imilcil, ⵉⵎⵉⵍⵛⵉⵍ pronounced [i.mil.ʃil], Arabic: إملشيل) is a rural commune and small town in Midelt Province of central Morocco, with a population of about 1,858.

Nestled in the Atlas Mountains, it is located at an elevation of 2119 m in the valley of Asif Mellulen ("white river"). The area of Imilchil is home to the Ait Hdiddu tribe, belonging to the Ait Yafelman confederation, and the inhabitants speak Central Atlas Tamazight.

Tourist attractions in the area include lakes Isli and Tislit, the caves of Axyam (Akhyam), the Aguni waterfalls, the Ziz Gorges and Valley and the igherman castles (ksars) of the area.

== Sidi Ahmed Oulmaghni festival ==
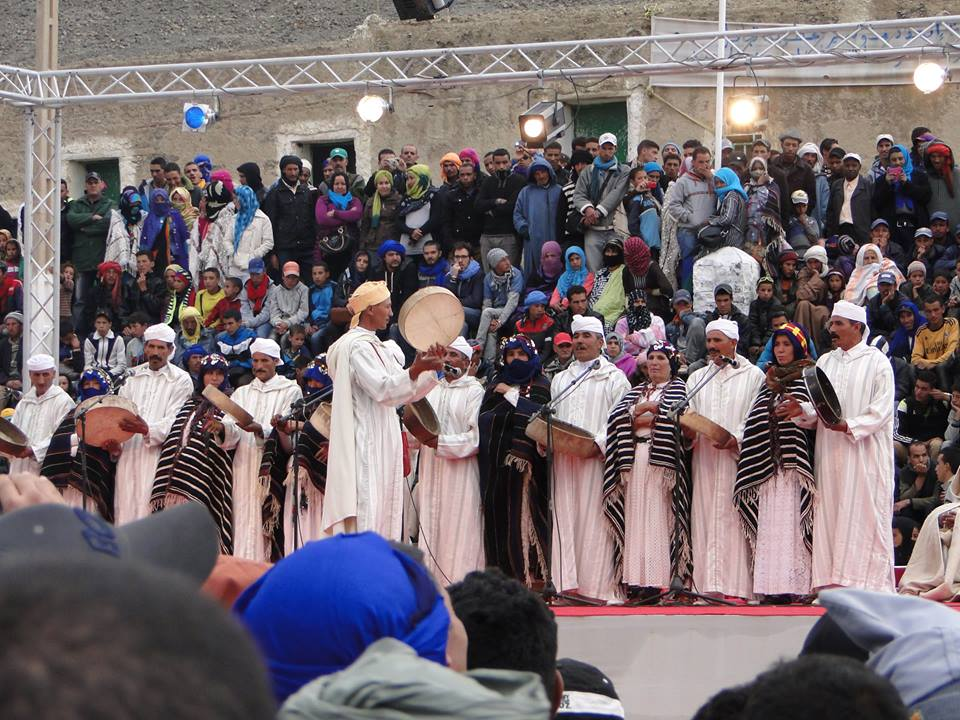
Ahidus at the moussem

The town of Imilchil is symbolic for the local Amazigh tribes, known for its Moussem (festival), officially known as Sidi Ahmed Oulmaghni, the patron saint of the Ait Hdiddu, a holy man known for mediating between the Ait Yafelman clans. The legend goes that two young people from different clans fell in love, but were forbidden to see each other by their families. The grief led them to cry themselves to death, creating the neighbouring lakes of Isli (his) and Tislit (hers) near Imilchil. The local tribes decided to use the opportunity of the annual visit to the shrine of the patron saint (the date of which also corresponds with the lovers' death) so that members of the tribes could marry each other.

In reality, the region has a scattering of far-flung and remote douars (villages), so when a young couples want to register their engagement, they can't do so in their douar. Up to 40 couples take their vows on the same day. The festival is rich with music, dancing, feasts, and colorful clothing. The celebrations attract many tourists to the area, and though tourism contributes to the local economy, there are fears that the rituals can be affected by the foreigners.

== Climate ==
Due to its altitude, Imilchil has a severe humid continental climate (Dfb), according to the Köppen system due to its below-freezing average temperature for the coldest month. Summers are hot and quite dry, with warm days and cool nights while winters are cold and snowy with below-freezing conditions, especially at night.

Climate data for Imilchil (1999-2019 averages)
Month	Jan	Feb	Mar	Apr	May	Jun	Jul	Aug	Sep	Oct	Nov	Dec	Year
Mean daily maximum °C (°F)	5.6 (42.1)	6.6 (43.9)	10.4 (50.7)	14.1 (57.4)	17.9 (64.2)	23.3 (73.9)	27.5 (81.5)	26.2 (79.2)	21.4 (70.5)	16.4 (61.5)	10.0 (50.0)	7.5 (45.5)	15.6 (60.0)
Daily mean °C (°F)	−0.4 (31.3)	0.6 (33.1)	4.0 (39.2)	7.4 (45.3)	11.1 (52.0)	16.1 (61.0)	19.9 (67.8)	18.8 (65.8)	14.4 (57.9)	10.0 (50.0)	3.9 (39.0)	1.3 (34.3)	8.9 (48.1)
Mean daily minimum °C (°F)	−5.4 (22.3)	−4.6 (23.7)	−1.9 (28.6)	1.1 (34.0)	4.5 (40.1)	8.7 (47.7)	12.0 (53.6)	11.6 (52.9)	8.2 (46.8)	4.3 (39.7)	−1.1 (30.0)	−3.5 (25.7)	2.8 (37.1)
Average precipitation mm (inches)	53 (2.1)	54 (2.1)	64 (2.5)	72 (2.8)	73 (2.9)	46 (1.8)	30 (1.2)	42 (1.7)	58 (2.3)	52 (2.0)	53 (2.1)	46 (1.8)	643 (25.3)
Source: climate-data.org
