= Itzer =

Itzer ⵉⵜⵣⵔ إيتزر
- Town
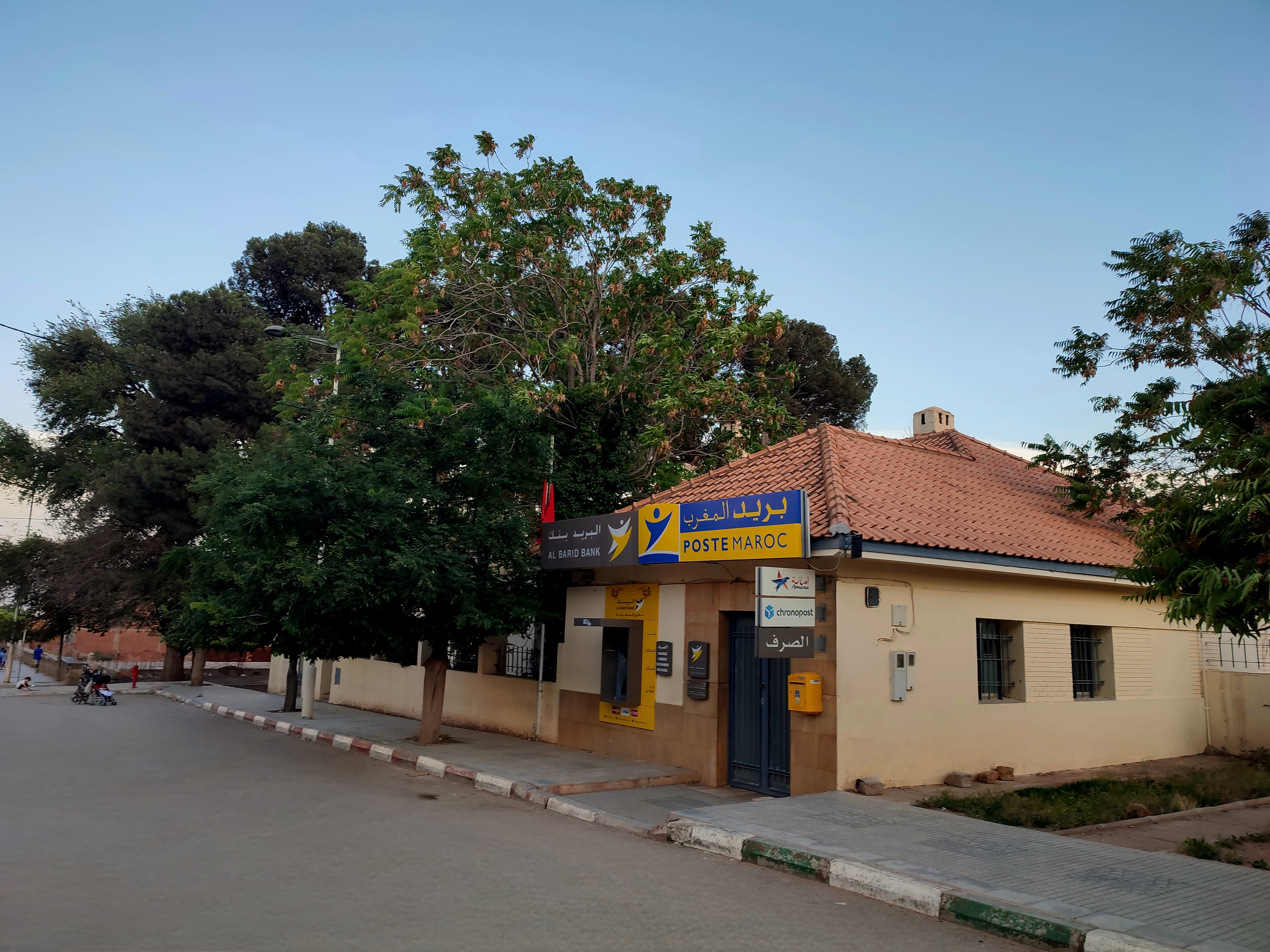
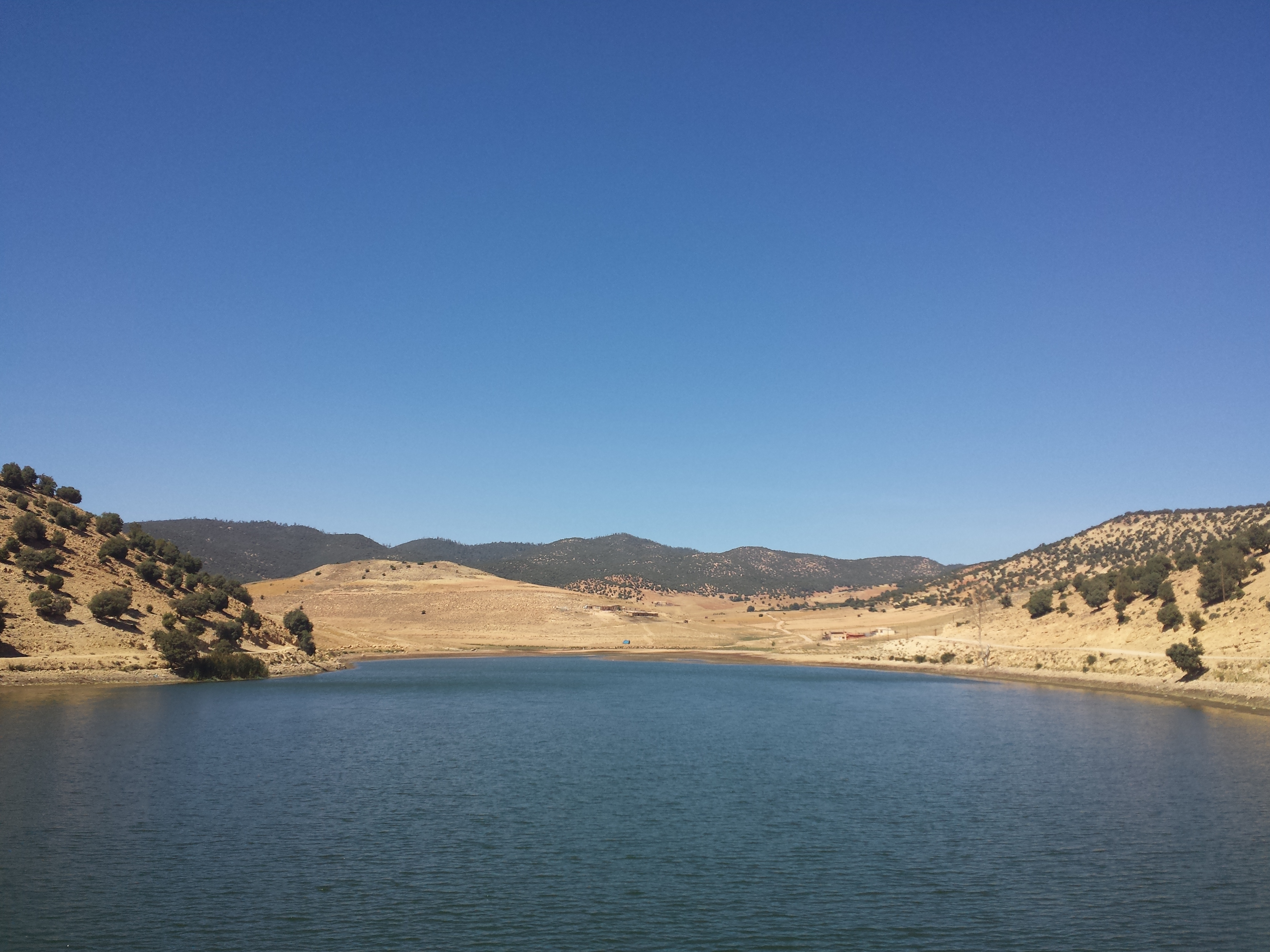
- Interactive map of Itzer
- Coordinates: 32°53′N 5°03′W
- Country: Morocco
- Region: Drâa-Tafilalet
- Province: Midelt Province

Population (2004)
  - Total: 5,947
- Time zone: UTC+0 (GMT)

Itzer (Arabic: إيتزر; Standard Moroccan Tamazight: ⵉⵜⵣⵔ) is a town and commune in Midelt Province, Drâa-Tafilalet, Morocco. At the 2004 census, it had a population of 5,947.
