= Gerry and Ziz =

Canadian music variety television series

- Directed by: Bob Weinstein
- Country of origin: Canada
- Original language: English
- No. of seasons: 1

Production
- Producer: Marv Terhock
- Running time: 30 minutes

Original release
- Network: CBC Television
- Release: 8 July – 2 September 1979

Gerry And Ziz is a Canadian music variety television program that aired on CBC Television in 1979.

== Premise ==
This series was hosted by musicians Gerry Paquin and Gerard "Ziz" Jean, previously seen on Canadian Express. Jay Brazeau and David Gillies performed humour segments. Joan Armatrading, Leon Bibb, Charity Brown, Pauline Julien, Denise McCann, Colleen Peterson, Graham Shaw and Valdy were among the visiting artists.

== Production ==
Episodes were produced in Winnipeg by Marv Terhock with a live audience. Musical direction was by Ron Paley.

== Scheduling ==
The half-hour series aired on Sundays at 10:00 p.m. (Eastern) from 8 July to 2 September 1979.
