= Boumia, Morocco =

Boumia بومية ⴱⵓⵎⵢⴰ
- Town
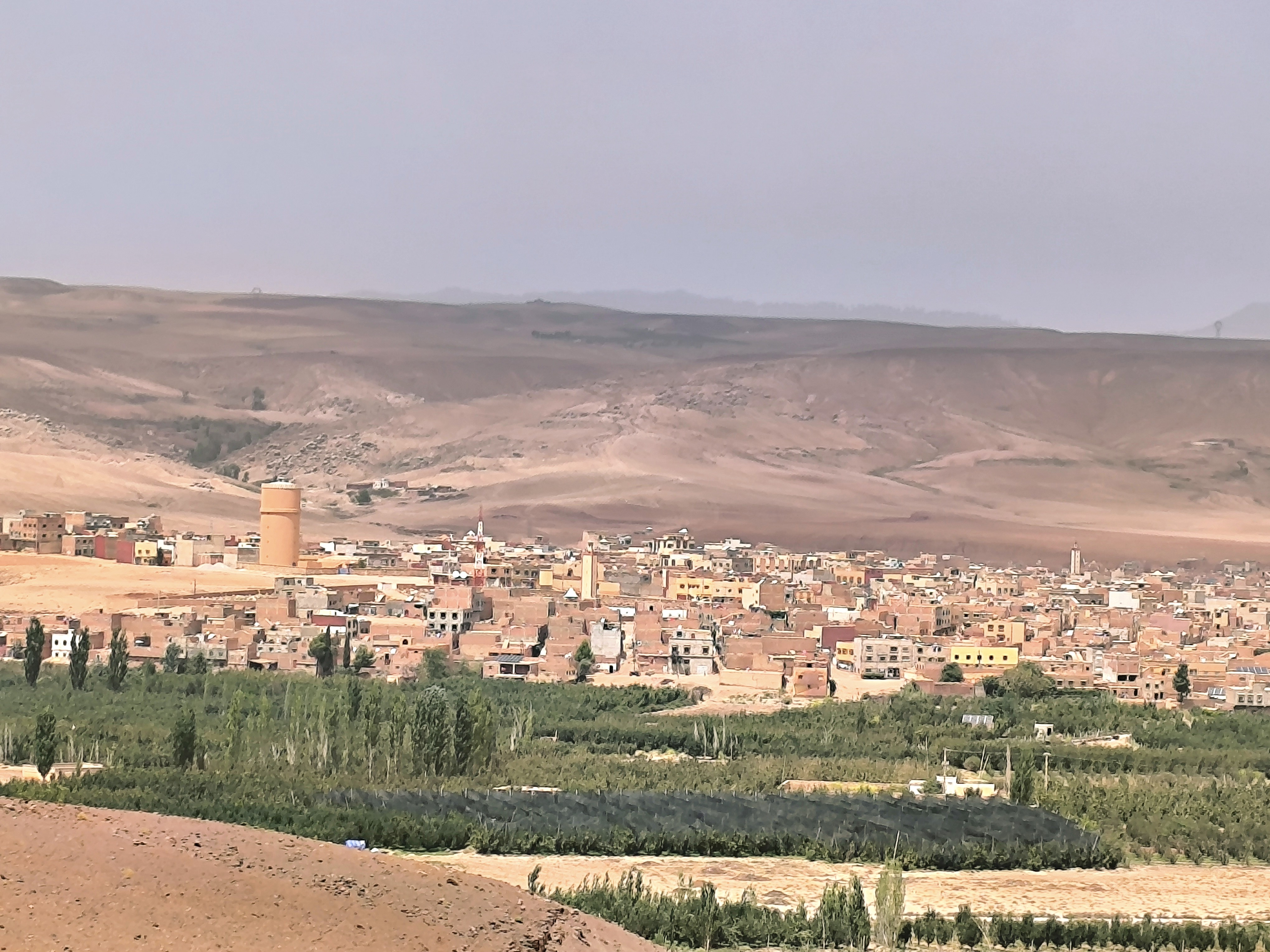
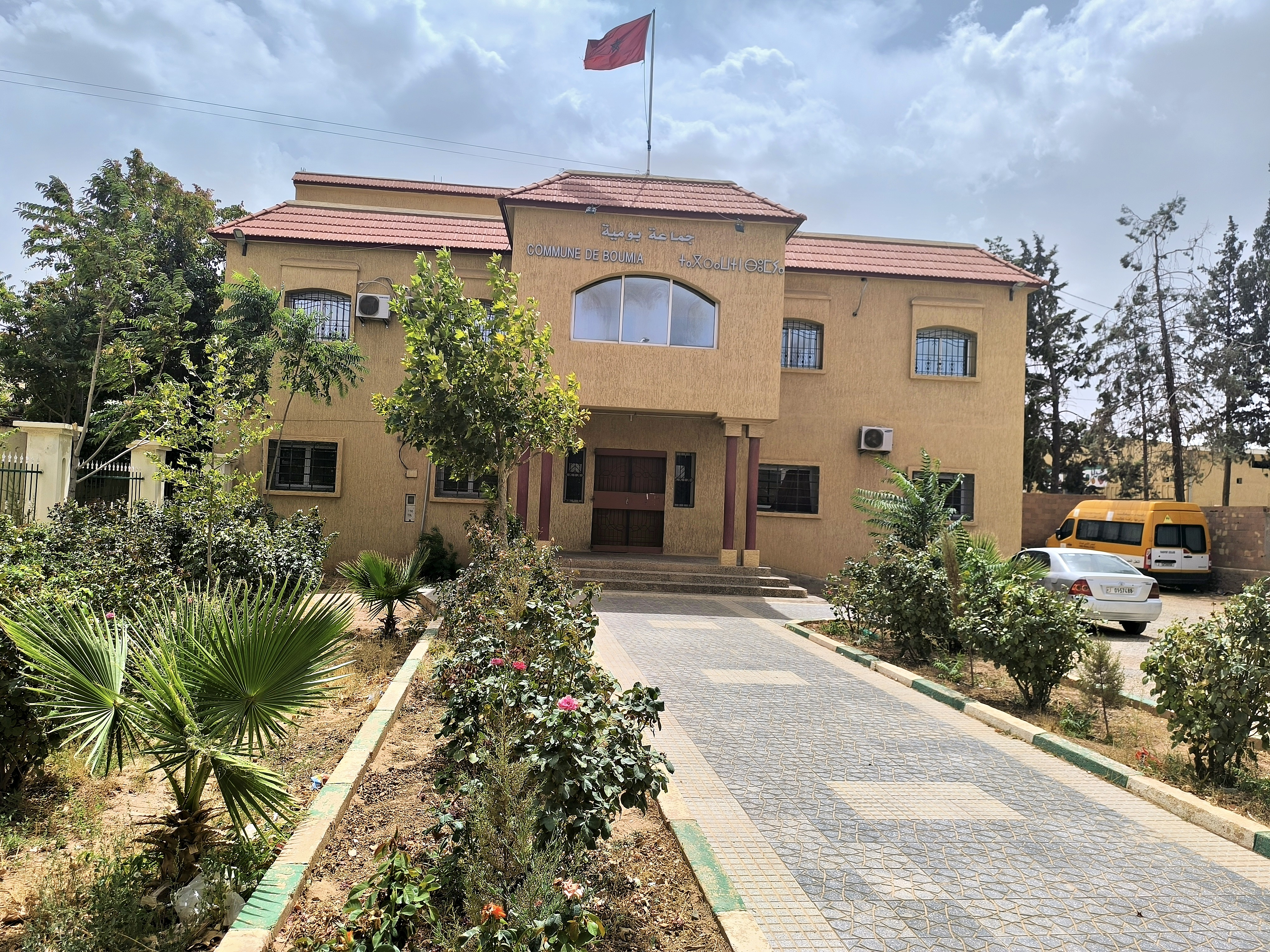
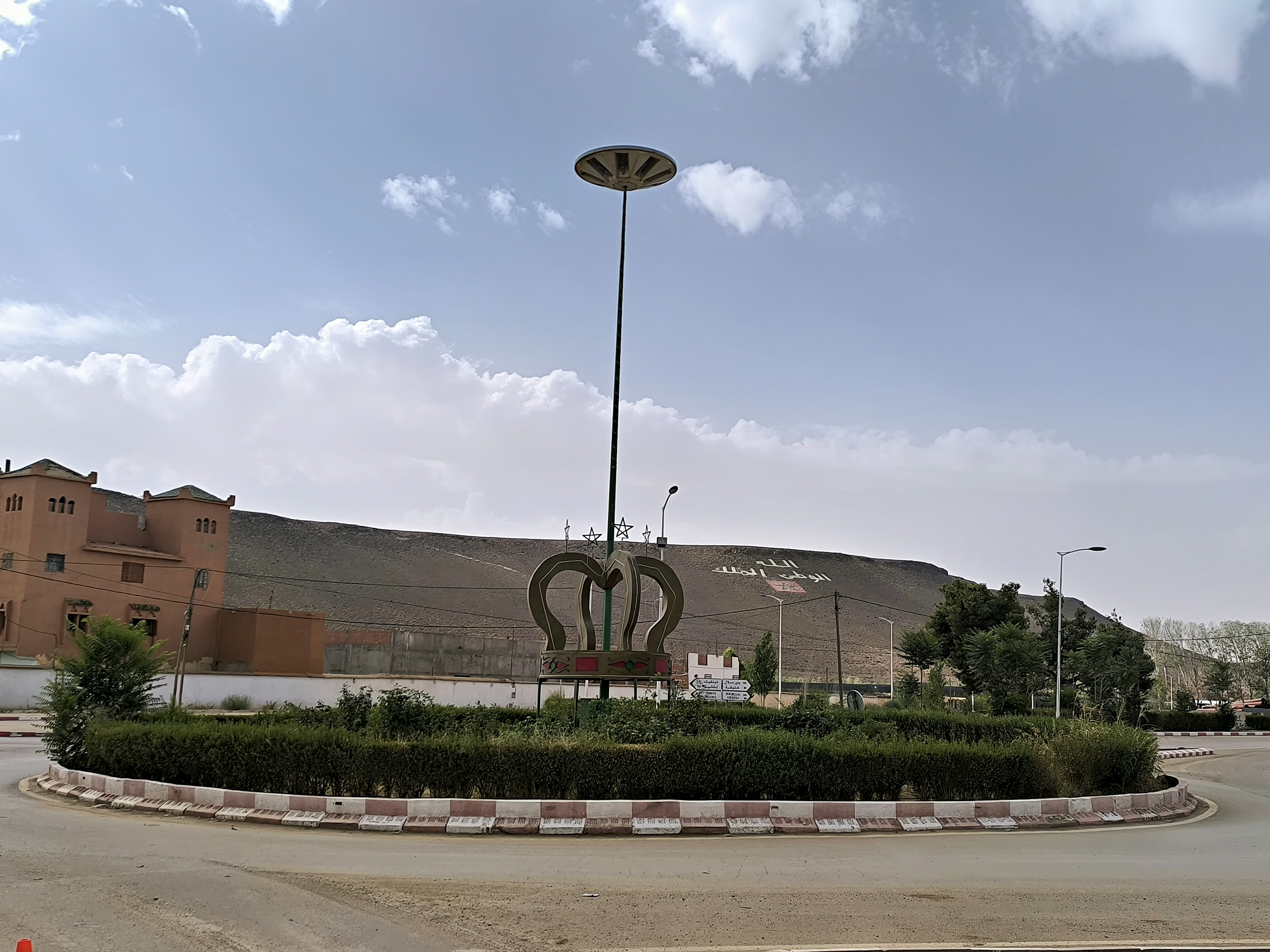
- Interactive map of Boumia
- Coordinates: 32°43′22″N 5°06′19″W
- Country: Morocco
- Region: Drâa-Tafilalet
- Province: Midelt

Government
  - Mayor: Marouan Ourir (RNI)
- Elevation: 1,520 m (4,990 ft)

Population (2024)
  - Total: 19,433
- Time zone: UTC+0 (GMT)

Boumia is a town in Midelt Province, Drâa-Tafilalet, Morocco. According to the 2024 census it has a population of 19,433.
