= Ziz Gorges =

Geological features in Morocco

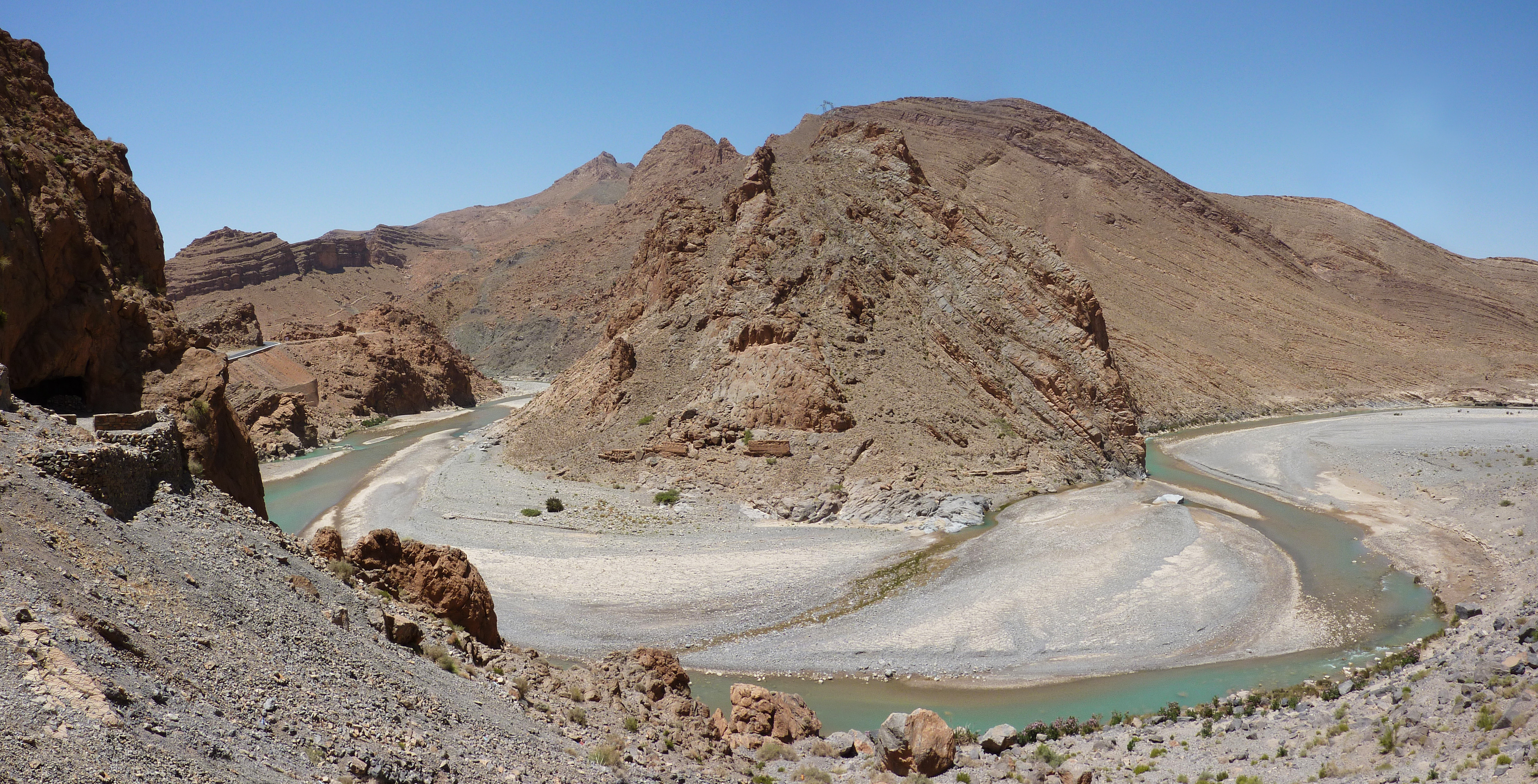
Panorama shot of the Ziz Gorges

The Ziz Gorges are a series of gorges in Morocco on the upper course of the Ziz River. They are defined by two gates at the southern and northern ends. At the southern end is the Hassan Addakil dam and lake. Nearby is the Tunnel de Légionnaire built by French colonial troops in the 1930s in order to create a passageway to the Ziz Gorge.

== Geology ==
The gorge was formed by the Ziz River cutting through the Atlas Mountains. Ancient fossils are commonly excavated and sold in the area. The river feeds a dense canopy of palmeraies (palm groves).

== History ==
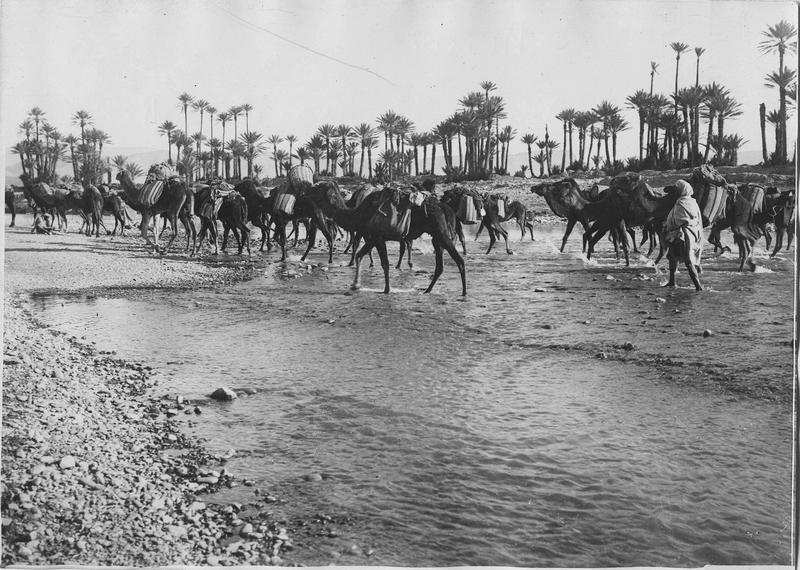
A convoy crossing the Ziz River

For centuries, the gorges have formed part of a traditional caravan trading route between settlements of the northern Sahara. In the 1st century, the Roman general Gaius Suetonius Paulinus crossed through them while leading troops across the Atlas Mountains.
