= Tislit Lake =

Lake Tislit
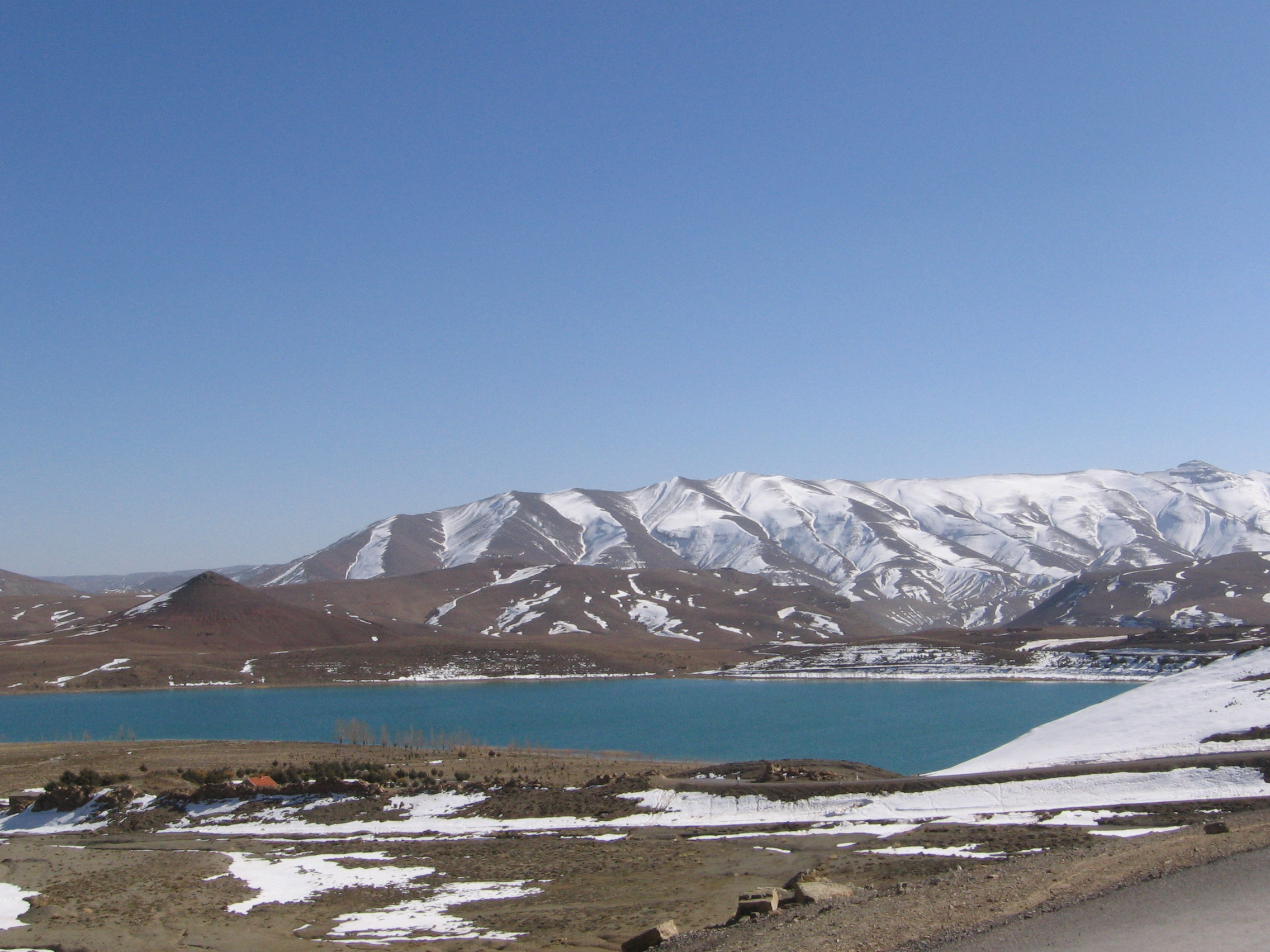
- Lake Tislit
- Interactive map of Lake Tislit
- Location: Haut Atlas Oriental National Park, Morocco
- Coordinates: 32°11′42″N 5°38′15″W
- Lake type: Meromictic lake
- Basin countries: Morocco
- Surface area: 1.3 km^{2} (0.50 sq mi)
- Average depth: 16 m (52 ft)
- Surface elevation: 2,119 m (6,952 ft)

Ramsar Wetland
- Official name: Lacs Isly-Tislite
- Designated: 15 January 2005
- Reference no.: 1480

Lake Tislit is a lake located in Morocco's Haut Atlas Oriental National Park, in the commune of Imilchil. This is an "agdal" (which means "proprietary grazing field" in the Berber language) where the tribes of Ayt Ḥdiddu lead their flocks during the summer. The lake has been designated as a protected Ramsar site since 2005.

Every year in September, a significant festival is held at the lake.

Lakes Isli and Tislit are named after epoymous characters from a Moroccan popular legend. A study suggested that both lakes were impact craters, given the presence of iron fragment and other materials around the lakes belonging to the same parent meteorite.
