= Ait Mhammid =

Ait Mhammid آيت محاميد
- Maqil Arab tribe
- Ethnicity: Arab
- Nisba: al-Mhammidi
- Location: Morocco
- Parent tribe: Ait Atta (not genealogically), Maqil
- Language: Arabic, Central Atlas Tamazight
- Religion: Sunni Islam

The Mhammid, also known as Ait Mhammid or Beni Mhamed, are a Berberized Arab tribe of the Banu Maqil, who joined the Ait Atta confederation.

== Origins ==
The Mhammid are Arab and descend from the Banu Maqil, retaining the memory of their ancestors who came from Seguia al-Hamra to settle in the Draa. Despite their Bedouin Arab origin, they eventually became berberized through contact with the Ait Atta.

== Territory and lifestyle ==
The Beni Mhammid lived scattered throughout the Draa, gathered in small communities living under huts adorned with palm leaves. A small town bears their name, serving as a cultural crossroads between haratins, Berbers, chorfas, the Mhammid and nomads. The Mhammid are now fully sedentary, as part of the Berberization process.

== History ==
The Mhammid came from Seguia al-Hamra and later migrated to the Draa region, which was primarily inhabited by Berber tribes. They were once considered the masters of the Draa, pillaging the population and instilling fear. Eventually, they became berberized and adopted sedentarism. This period of terror is well illustrated during the reign of Moulay Slimane, when the weakness of two tribes, the Bani Hayyoun and the Nessrat, made them powerless to defend the Lektaoua against Mhammid attacks. There is a divergence regarding their relationship with the Ait Atta; some historians describe a kind of submission or a power dynamic favorable to the Attaouis over the Mhammid, for instance, through their integration into an Ait Atta faction named "Ait Ounegbui," literally "the Guests". This integration is said to have resulted from the defeat of the Mhammid by the Ait Atta, under the leadership of Sheikh Aamamou, from the Maqilite tribe of the Âarib, who called on the Ait Atta to punish the Mhammid for their abuses. Following this, they submitted and joined the confederation. In the 1910s, historian Denoun described them as already integrated into the confederation. Others claim a rather exceptional independence compared to other tribes. They reportedly owned around 300 slaves.
