= David Montgomery Hart =

American anthropologist (1927–2001)

David Montgomery Hart (18 May 1927 – 22 May 2001) was an American anthropologist and historian who specialised in Berber tribes. He spent time living amongst Berber tribes like the Ait Waryagher of the Rif and the Ait Atta.

== Life and career ==
David Montgomery Hart was born on 18 May 1927, in Philadelphia, Pennsylvania. He did his doctoral studies under Carleton S. Coon.

Historian Sarah Barringer Gordon described Hart as an "anthropologist of the old school" and Islamic scholar and anthropologist Akbar Ahmed noted that Hart's brand of anthropology reflected an old tradition where anthropologists would go and rely on their senses for notes and live amongst the people they are studying.

Hart was a prolific letter-writer with Ernest Gellner saying in Tribe and State: Essays in Honour of David Montgomery Hart that Hart "has developed and perfected a distinctive literary form, the long ethnographic letter". His correspondence with Ross E. Dunn and other scholars which totalled over 10,000 pages was entrusted to the Moroccan National Archives.

He was married to Ursula Cook Kingsmill who lived with him amongst the Berber tribes. He died on 22 May 2001 in Garrucha, Spain aged 74.

== Published works ==
=== Books ===
- The Aith Waryaghar of the Moroccan Rif: An Ethnography and History. U. of Arizona P. 1976. ISBN 978-0-8357-5290-9.
- Dadda 'Atta And His Forty Grandsons: The Socio-political Organization Of The Ait Atta Of Southern Morocco. Avalon Publishing. 1981. ISBN 978-0-906559-06-2.
- The Ait 'Atta of Southern Morocco Daily Life & Recent History. United Kingdom: Middle East & North African Studies Press. 1984. ISBN 9780906599150.
- Guardians of the Khaibar Pass: The Social Organisation and History of the Afridis of Pakistan. Vanguard Books. 1985. ISBN 9789694024356.
- Banditry in Islam: Case Studies from Morocco, Algeria and the Pakistan North West Frontier. Middle East & North African Studies Press. 1987. ISBN 978-0-906559-22-2.
- Tribalism and Rural Society in the Islamic World. Cass. 1999. ISBN 978-0-7146-4928-3.
- Tribe and Society in Rural Morocco. Psychology Press. 2000. ISBN 978-0-7146-5016-6.
- Muslim Tribesmen and the Colonial Encounter in Fiction and on Film. Het Spinhuis Publishers. 2001. ISBN 978-90-5589-205-1.
- Qabila: Tribal Profiles and Tribe-state Relations in Morocco and on the Afghanistan-Pakistan Frontier. Transaction Publishers. 2001. ISBN 978-90-5589-204-4.

=== Articles ===
- "An Ethnographic survey of the Riffian tribe of Aith Wuryaghil". Tamuda. 2 (1): 51–86. 1954.
- "Notes on the Rifian Community of Tangier". Middle East Journal. 11 (2): 153–162. 1957. ISSN 0026-3141.
- "The Social Structure of the Rgībāt Bedouins of the Western Sahara". Middle East Journal. 16 (4): 515–527. 1962. ISSN 0026-3141.
- "A customary law document from the Ait 'Atta of the Jbil Saghru". Revue de l'Occident musulman et de la Méditerranée (in French). 1 (1): 91–112. 1966. doi:10.3406/remmm.1966.913. ISSN 0035-1474.
- "Segmentary systems and the role of "five fifths" in tribal Morocco". Revue des mondes musulmans et de la Méditerranée. 3 (1): 65–95. 1967. doi:10.3406/remmm.1967.945.
- "Conflicting models of a Berber tribal structure in the Moroccan Rif : the segmentary and alliance system of the Aith Varyaghar". Revue des mondes musulmans et de la Méditerranée. 7 (1): 93–99. 1970. doi:10.3406/remmm.1970.1060.
- "The Ait Ba 'Amran of Ifni : an ethnographie survey". Revue des mondes musulmans et de la Méditerranée. 15 (1): 61–74. 1973. doi:10.3406/remmm.1973.1227.
- Gellner, Ernest; Micaud, Charles, eds. (1973). "The tribe in modern Morocco: two case studies". Arabs and Berbers: From Tribe to Nation in North Africa. Duckworth. pp. 46–48. ISBN 978-0-7156-0639-1.
- "Notes on the socio-political structure and institutions of two tribes of the Ait Yafalman confederacy : the Ait Murghad and the Ait Hadiddu". Revue des mondes musulmans et de la Méditerranée. 26 (1): 55–74. 1978. doi:10.3406/remmm.1978.1824.
- "The Ait Sukhmann of the Moroccan Central Atlas : an ethnographie survey and a case study in Sociocultural Anomaly". Revue des mondes musulmans et de la Méditerranée. 38 (1): 137–152. 1984. doi:10.3406/remmm.1984.2050.
- "A. Review article: Magic, Witchcraft and Sorcery in Morocco: the sociology of Evans‐Pritchard and the ethnography of Mustapha Akhmisse, M.D.". British Society for Middle Eastern Studies. Bulletin. 14 (2): 183–193. 1988-01-01. doi:10.1080/13530198808705465. ISSN 0305-6139.
- "Faulty models of North African and Middle Eastern tribal structures". Revue des mondes musulmans et de la Méditerranée. 68 (1): 225–238. 1993. doi:10.3406/remmm.1993.2569.
- "Murder in the Market Penal Aspects of Berber Customary Law in the Precolonial Moroccan Rif". Islamic Law and Society. 3 (3): 343–371. 1996. ISSN 0928-9380.
- "Berber tribal alliance networks in pre‐colonial North Africa: the Algerian saff, the Moroccan liff and the chessboard model of Robert Montagne". The Journal of North African Studies. 1 (2): 192–205. 1996-09-01. doi:10.1080/13629389608718275. ISSN 1362-9387.
- "Berber names and substrata in Mauritania and the Western Sahara: linguistic and ethno‐historical guidelines for future research on a paradoxical problem". The Journal of North African Studies. 2 (1): 58–71. June 1997. doi:10.1080/13629389708718288. ISSN 1362-9387.
- "The Berber Dahir of 1930 in colonial Morocco: then and now (1930–1996)". The Journal of North African Studies. 2 (2): 11–33. September 1997. doi:10.1080/13629389708718294. ISSN 1362-9387.
- "The Rgaybat: camel nomads of the Western Sahara". The Journal of North African Studies. 3 (4): 28–54. 1998-12-01. doi:10.1080/13629389808718342. ISSN 1362-9387.
- "The penal code in the customary law of the Swasa of the Moroccan Western Atlas and Anti‐Atlas". The Journal of North African Studies. 3 (4): 55–67. 1998-12-01. doi:10.1080/13629389808718343. ISSN 1362-9387.
- "Right and left in the Atlas Mountains: dual symbolic classifications among Moroccan Berbers". The Journal of North African Studies. 4 (3): 30–44. September 1999. doi:10.1080/13629389908718372. ISSN 1362-9387.
- "Persistence and change in names on the North African landscape: Berber Tribes in Ibn Khaldun's genealogies and as they appear today". The Journal of North African Studies. 5 (1): 121–146. March 2000. doi:10.1080/13629380008718390. ISSN 1362-9387.
