= Meteor Airlines =

Moroccan rock band

- Origin: Tinghir, Morocco
- Genre: Amazigh Rock
- Years active: 2016–present
- Website: www.meteorairlines.ma

Meteor Airlines is a Moroccan rock band formed in 2016 in Kalaat M'Gouna, whose music blends traditional Amazigh sounds with modern rock. The band's members are originally from Tinghir, and their unique style has garnered attention both locally and internationally, with their music often exploring themes of cultural preservation, environmental issues, and resilience.

Meteor Airlines incorporates elements of Amazigh heritage in both their music and visual identity, including the Azennar cape, which is said to symbolize leadership and unity within the group. In 2024, the band received the National Amazigh Culture Award from the Royal Institute of Amazigh Culture, a recognition of their contributions to promoting Amazigh culture.

== History ==
The band was formed in 2016 by three musicians at Meteor Records studio, located in Ayt Boubker, near Kalaat M'Gouna. It now has several members, including lead vocalist Ahmed Ennassiri and the band's poet and manager Rachid Ennassiri. They chose the name "Meteor Airlines" inspired by the meteors and airplanes that illuminated the sky of Sidi Boubker.

In 2017, Meteor Airlines released their debut single, "The Antidote", followed by two more singles, "I Invented Fire" and "Rubber Dreams", in 2018. Their first full album, South by Southeast, was also released in November 2018 and received widespread acclaim within Morocco. In 2019, they were selected to participate in the HIBA Rec program's Rock/Metal session, where they collaborated with producer Alex Cappa. Together, they recorded their new single "Migrate" at Hiba Studio.

On 13 February 2020, the 87th anniversary of the Battle of Bougafer between the French forces and Ait Atta led by Assou Oubasslam, they released the song "Warru" in memory of the victims of the battle.

In February 2021, they released the single "Tawada" (meaning "travel"), which recounts events in the 1950s and 70s in southeast Morocco, when Félix Mora was recruiting workers from the region, to work in the mines in France.

In April 2023, they released the single "Iblis" (named after the Arabic word for "devil"), whose lyrics were written by Moroccan poet Mohamed Bouazza ben Youssef.

In January 2024, on the occasion of the Amazigh New Year 2974, they released an album titled "Agdal", named after a historical term for "garden" or "private grazing area", and also a traditional resource management system. The album's theme focuses on climate change and its effects, biodiversity, and ecosystem resilience, and was part of a collaboration with the Community Heritage Exchange Initiative (CHEI), as well as the U.S. Department of State Ambassadors Fund for Cultural Preservation and StoryCenter. The band went on a tour immediately afterwards (from 10 to 20 January 2024), supported by the French Institute in Morocco and Agence de développement de l’Oriental (ADO). In April of the same year, they had their first concert in France. In November, they departed in an international tour in the United Kingdom, Ireland, France and Morocco.

== Style and themes ==
The band's lyrics often explore themes related to their origins, such as harsh climates, poverty, immigration, brotherhood, and love, which they express in both Darija and Amazigh. Their musical style combines alternative rock with rhythms distinctive to the southeastern region of Morocco. Drawing on the diverse influences of its members, Meteor Airlines blends various genres, including classical music, metal, punk, and pop rock. They incorporate local styles such as Ahidous or Izli, and Gnawa.

Their unique music style has been called "Amazigh rock".

== Work ==
=== Singles ===
- 2017: The Antidote
- 2018:
  - I Invented Fire
  - Rubber Dreams
- 2019:
  - Amdikar (ⴰⵎⴷⵢⴽⴰⵔ, dialogue)
  - Migrate
  - Tayri (ⵜⴰⵢⵔⵉ, love)
- 2020: Warru (ⵡⴰⵔⵔⵓ)
- 2021: Tawada (ⵜⴰⵡⴰⴷⴰ, trip/travel)
- 2022:
  - Tamziyt (ⵜⴰⵎⵥⵉⵢⵜ, childhood)
  - Awdyan (ⴰⵡⴷⵢⴰⵏ, nobody)
  - Aha (ⴰⵀⴰ)
- 2023:
  - Iblis (ⵉⴱⵍⵉⵙ, devil)
  - Ighman (ⵉⵖⵯⵎⴰⵏ)

=== Albums ===
- 2018: South by Southeast
- 2024: Agdal (ⴰⴳⵯⴷⴰⵍ)

== Public appearances ==
=== Festivals and concerts ===
- 2019: L'Boulevard in Casablanca, Morocco.
- 2023:
  - Rock/Metal "Tricinty" event in Rabat, Morocco.
  - 21st edition of L'Boulevard in Casablanca, Morocco.
- 2024:
  - March: South by Southwest festival in Austin, Texas, United States.
  - April: concert in Paris, France.
  - July:
    - Timitar Festival in Agadir.
    - WeCasablanca Festival.
  - October: Meyedine theater in Marrakesh.
- 2025:
  - April: Morockshow festival at Villa Marco in Marrakesh, performing alongside the American band Umphrey's McGee.
- 2026:
  - January: concerts at the Cinéma Renaissance in Rabat and the Meydene in Marrakesh, celebrating the Amazigh New Year (Yennayer 2976) and the band's tenth anniversary.
  - May: concert at the Bataclan in Paris.
  - July–August: Pol'and'Rock Festival in Czaplinek-Broczyno, Poland, becoming the first Moroccan band to perform at the festival.
  - September: Moroccan Incident at Villa Marco playing alongside The String Cheese Incident

=== Tours ===
- 10 to 20 January 2024: national tour in Morocco in the cities of Nador, Tangier, Casablanca, Kenitra, El Jadida, Marrakesh, and Agadir.
- October–November 2024: "Agdal" international tour in the United Kingdom and Ireland, with concerts in Edinburgh, London, Liverpool, Manchester and Dublin, as well as France and Morocco.

== Awards and distinctions ==
- 2019: selected for Hiba Rec Program by Hiba Foundation.
- 10 July 2024: Best Artistic Practice in the Mediterranean region by CREACT4MED in Barcelona, Spain.
- 17 October 2024: IRCAM's National Prize of Amazigh culture 2023, modern song category
