= Agdal (disambiguation) =

Agdal is a historical concept in Morocco, referring to government-owned or private gardens.

Agdal may also refer to:

== Morocco ==
=== Locations ===
- Agdal (Rabat), an urban community in Rabat, Morocco
- Agdal Gardens, a garden area in Marrakech, Morocco
- Agdal, an urban community in Fez, Morocco
- Agdal, an urban community in Meknes, Morocco

=== Other ===
- 2024 music album by Moroccan rock band Meteor Airlines

== India ==
- Agdal, Rewa, a village in India

== Other ==
- Nina Agdal (born 1992), Danish model

== See also ==
- Agda (disambiguation)
