= Ait Yafelman =

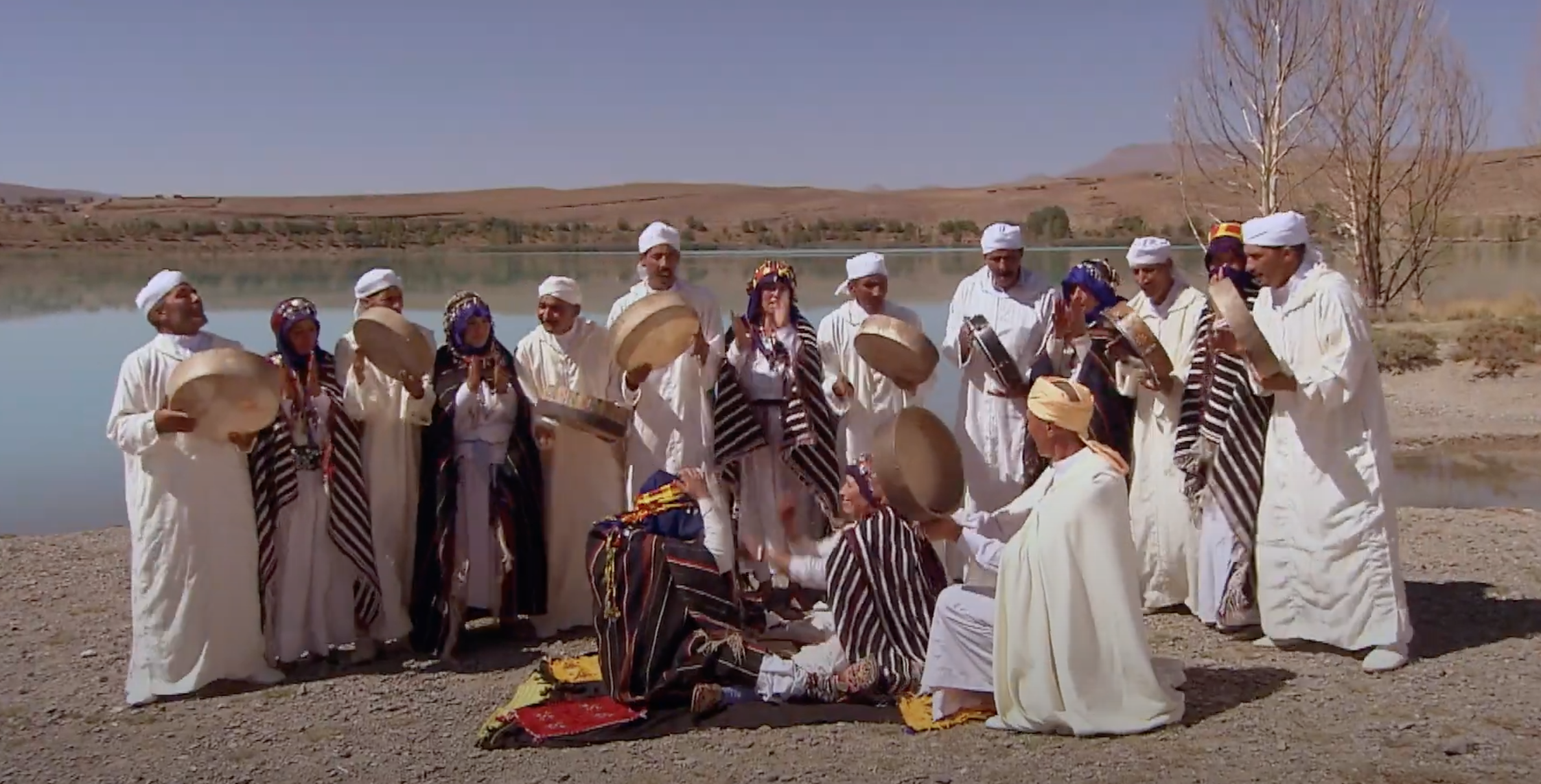
Men and women from the Ait Haddidou performing Ahidus

The Ait Yafelman (Central Atlas Tamazight: ⴰⵢⵜ ⵢⴰⴼⵍⵎⴰⵏ, romanized: Ayt Yaflman, lit. 'those who have found peace') are a large Berber tribal confederation spread over the southern end of the High Atlas of Morocco. They originally consisted of 4 tribes: Ait Morghad, Ait Haddidou, Ait Izdeg and Ait Yehia. These tribes created the alliance in the 17th century to counter the expansion of their Ait Atta neighbours. The Ait Yafelman speak Central Atlas Tamazight.

== Etymology ==
Ait Yafelman literally means "those who have found peace" or "the people who seek the peace". It comes from ayt meaning "descendants" and yaf lman meaning "he finds peace, trust, reliance". One popular etymology for the name is aduwwad anafalman meaning "we will find peace" while another one is that the wife of the alleged ancestor Midul told her sons, afat l-man, afat l-man meaning "Find the peace, find the peace!".

== History ==
Aït Yafelman Confederation Iyafelman
- 1654–1933
- Status: Tribal Confederation
- Capital: Imilchil
- Religion: Islam
- History
  - Establishment: 1654
  - Pacification of Morocco: 1933
Succeeded by
French protectorate in Morocco
- Today part of: Morocco

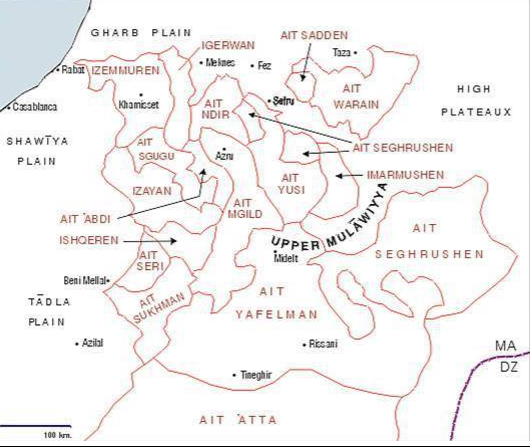
The Berber tribes of the Middle Atlas. Ait Yafelman towards the centre

The confederacy's point of origin is the Upper Dades Valley, specifically the twin regions of the Amdghus and the Imedghass north of Msimrir on the south slope of the Central Atlas.

There are different versions to how the Ait Yafelman merged. One version says that the Ait Yafelman formed in the 17th century in response to the expansion of the Aït Atta. This happened when Moulay Ismael sent a letter to the shurfa of Ait Sidi Bou Yaqoub to tell them to encourage the tribes of the area to join in the face of Ait Atta expansion. Another version says it happened in 1646 after their victory against the Ait Atta at the Battle of Tazrout.

According to a third version, an w-'Atta arrived among the Ait Merghud (the Ait Merghud used to make butter for the Ait Atta and were once part of the Ait Atta) and said "Give me butter, I want to rub it on my sandals". The attendant member of Ait Murghad told him he had none and the w-'Atta picked up his sandals and attacked him on the face. Furious, the member of Ait Murghad went to tell everyone what happened so they decided to form a liff (coalition) of tribes against the Ait Atta. They decided they would make anafalman (peace) through revenge on the Ait Atta and to never again give butter to them. This led to the formation of the Ait Yafelman who would go on to become rivals and perpetually be in a state of open warfare and relenting hostility with the Ait Atta.

There is also another tradition that assigns an ancestor to the Ait Yafelman called Midul, son of Jalut who is often described as ancestor of the Berbers and he had other sons like Zoulit, Malou, Atta and Baïbbi. These sons with the exception of the latter are said to be the founders of large tribal confederations (for example Atta or Dadda Atta is the founder of the Ait Atta). Some of these names can be found in branches of the Ait Hdiddou. According to this tradition, Midul had five sons: Hadiddu, Izdig, Yahya, Agra and Yumur who became ancestors of the Ait Hdiddou, Ait Izdig, Ait Yahya, Igarwan and Ait Yumur. This tradition says that the Ait Marghad are not true sons of Midul or true Yafelman since they joined later.

From the sixteenth century they exceeded the passes of Jbel El Ayachi and Jbel Maaskar to occupy the vast land they live today, and M. Peyron limited as follows: "the whole High Atlas between Tounfite, Midelt and Tizi N'Telghoumt to the North, and Msemrir, Goulmima, Errachidia and Boudnib to the South; and the valley of the Oued Ait Aissa as the furthermost line of spreading to the East, and the upper Oued El Abid, the Assif Melloul and Dades to the West."

David Hart estimates the Ait Yafelman to number about 200,000 in 1960 based on the 1960 Moroccan census.

This vast territory is therefore in direct contact with this tribes:

- Ait Atta to the Southwest,
- Ait Soukhman to the West,
- Ait Myeld to the North,
- Ait Youssi and Ait El Haj to the North East, and
- Ait Saghrouchen in the East.

The country where the Yafelmans live is a mountainous area where Jbel El Ayachi rises to 3737 meters.

== Tribes ==
The Ait Yafelman are made up of the following tribes:

- Ait Marghad - The Ait Marghad were also known as the Ait Ghurm Udi meaning "the children of butter giving" because they traditionally gave butter to the Ait Atta. They are said to have historically been part of the Ait Atta. However, they had a falling out with the Ait Atta and proceeded to form the Ait Yafelman with three other tribes. They went on to become a major part of the Ait Yafelman and major enemies of the Ait Atta. In the 15th century, they had 500-600 families and were made up of three major segments: the Ait Youb, Ait Mesri and the Irbiben. A nomadic segment of about 300 families called the Ait Aissa Izem would later become important among them. The Ait Aissa Izen were one of the last groups to abandon resistance against French colonialism in the Moroccan south east. The fiercest resistance fighters were recruited from the Ait Aissa Izem (for example Zayd ou-Skounti) because of their legendary skills involving ambushes and raids. Today they are made up of 5 clans those being the Ait Youb, Ait Mhammad, Irbiben, Ait Aissa Izem and Ait 'Amar u-Gwahi.
- Ait Hdiddou - Hdiddou can mean "small" or "strong" according to oral tradition. The Ait Hdiddou were able to expand their territory and extend towards the upper Ziz and towards the valley of Asif Melloul and the plateau of the Lakes. This happened in two stages: first at the expense of the Igerwan who were deported to the region of Meknes by Moulay Ismail and second by the progressive eviction of the Ait Atta. The village of Agoudal was built after the famous battle there where the fifty of Agoudal distinguished themselves and whose descendants still retain a certain prestige. The last acquisition gave the Ait Hdiddou the strategic crossing point of Imilchil (imi Išil, "the door of wheat"). The Ait Hdiddou of the high mountain or Ait Hdiddou n-Midoul, a noble branch of the tribe, acquired it. There is also another branch called the Ait Hdiddou n-Zoulit who were displaced by Moulay Ismail or by Moulay Slimane and replaced by the Ait Izdeg.
- Ait Yahia
- Ait Izdeg (or Izdey) - The Ait Izdeg called themselves the Ait Oudad from aḍaḍ (finger) because they chose their foreign guests by the index finger. They are an important pastoral tribe from the Saharan slope of the High Atlas and now form the population base of Midelt. Under the pressure of the Ait Atta, they were forced to leave Todgha after the 12th century and to move to the Ziz valley where they settled in the 17th century. They were long considered to be the standard-bearers of the Ait Yafelman confederation. The important of Outat and the predominance of the Ait Izdeg there led to Moulay Slimane bestowing the makhzen caid of all the Ait Yafelman to a notable Zedgi Brahim ou-Issimour. Until the Protectorate, the Ait Izdeg were the masters of the Outat Valley and were loyal to the Alaouites.
- Ait Aissa Bu Hmar
- Ait Mgild

Other tribes joined the confederation like the Ait Ayyash and some sedentary Arabic-speaking tribes. These tribes being the Sabbah Arabs and Safalat.

== Bibliography ==
- Mezzine, Larbi (1987). "Le Tafilalt, Contribution à l'histoire du Maroc aux XVIIè et XVIIIè siècles". Publications de la FLSH, Mohammed V University (in French). Rabat.
- Peyron, Michaël (1984). "Contribution à l'histoire du Haut-Atlas Oriental : les Ayt Yafelman". Revue de l'Occident musulman et de la Méditerranée (in French). 38: 117–135. doi:10.3406/remmm.1984.2049.
