= Ait Atta =

Berber tribe

Ait Atta Ayt Ɛṭṭa ⴰⵢⵜ ⵄⵟⵟⴰ
- Berber Sanhaja tribal confederation
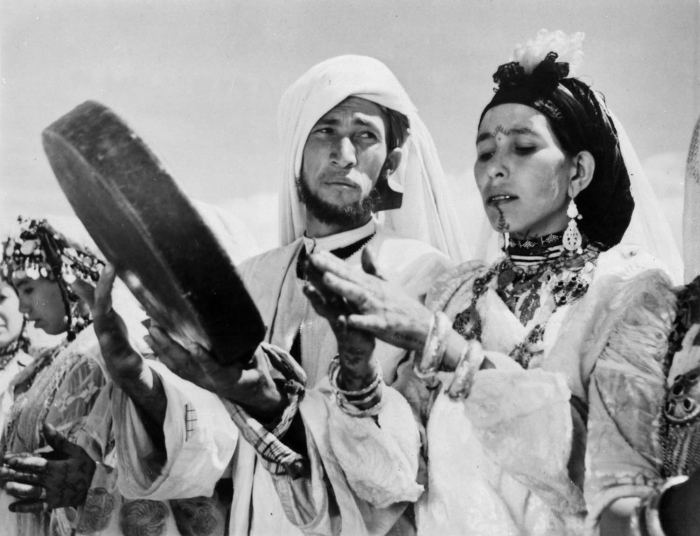
- A man and a woman from the Ait Atta tribe performing Ahidus
- Ethnicity: Sanhaja Berbers
- Location: Adrar Sahghro
- Descended from: Dadda Atta
- Branches: Aït Aïssa Mzim; Aït Alwan; Aït Isful; Aït Unibgi; Aït Wahlim; Aït Wallal/Ounir
- Language: Central Atlas Tamazight
- Religion: Islam

The Ait Atta (Central Atlas Tamazight: ⴰⵢⵜ ⵄⵟⵟⴰ, romanized: Ayt Ɛṭṭa) are a large Berber Sanhaja tribal confederation (Note: Anthropologist David Hart argues that they should more accurately be described as a "supertribe" because all the tribes and fractions of the Ait Atta claim an agnatic descent from a common ancestor, Dadda Atta.) of south eastern Morocco. They are divided into "five fifths" (khams khmas), all said to descend from the forty sons of their common ancestor and founder Dadda Atta. These fifths are the Ait Wallal, Ait Wahlim, Ait Isful-Ait Alwan, Ait Aizza Mzin and Ait Unibgi. They speak a dialect of Tamazight.

The Ait Atta first emerged in the Jbel Saghro which they consider their heartland and were originally nomadic but became semi-sedentary. Their quick expansion lead to conflict with other tribes causing some to form the Ait Yafelman confederation in response to their aggression. After the Ait Atta first encountered the French in 1899, they clashed continuously with the French until their surrender in the Battle of Bougafer in 1933.

== Origin ==
=== Dadda Atta and his 40 sons ===
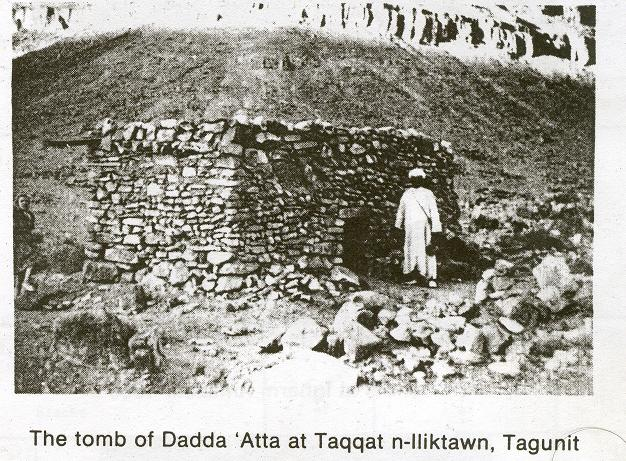
The tomb of Dadda Atta in Tagounite

A tradition of the Ait Atta says that they descend from the eponymous Berber ancestor Dadda Atta who was from the Saghro region and had forty sons. He employed a shepherd from the neighbouring Ait Siddrat tribe. One day, while Atta oversaw the simultaneous marriage of all forty of his sons, the Ait Siddrat shepherd betrayed Atta leading to the death of all forty of his sons at the hands of the shepherd's fellow tribesmen of the Ait Siddrat. Atta's sons managed to have already impregnated their wives before the attack and they miraculously survived the attack and conceived. Together they produced 39 sons and 1 daughter. Atta lived on until his grandsons grew up and was henceforth known as Dadda Atta meaning Grandfather Atta. With their built-up anger, they declared war on the Ait Siddrat pursuing them right up to the Tizi n-l-'Azz Pass in the Central High Atlas where Atta's mare raised her right foreleg. The Ait Atta took this as a sign that they must return to their homes in the Saghro. The Ait Siddrat did the same.

=== Descent from Goliath ===
A tradition of non-Atta origin claims that the Ait Atta descends from Goliath (Jalut) who left 4 sons that emigrated to North Africa from Palestine becoming the ancestors of the modern Moroccan Berbers. The oldest son Baibi was killed by Arabs while still a child hence the generalised Berber dislike of Arabs. There are 3 different traditions of the identity of the three other sons:

- Amazigh, ancestor of the Tamazight speakers of the Middle and Central High Atlas, Asusi, ancestor of the Shilha or the Susis and Arifi, ancestor of the Riffians,
- Midul, ancestor of the Zenata, Zulit, ancestor of the Masmuda and 'Atta, ancestor of the Sanhaja,
- Midul ancestor of the Ait Yafelman, Malu, ancestor of the tribes of the Middle Atlas and 'Atta, ancestor of the Ait Atta.

According to the third tradition, 'Atta had 6 sons: Hlim, 'Azza, Khalifa, Khabbash, Sful, and Mtir, ancestors of the Ait Wahlim, Ait Yazza, Ait Unibgi, Ait Khalifa, Ait Isful and Ait Ndir respectively. These are the clans of the Ait Atta.

== History ==
=== Establishment ===
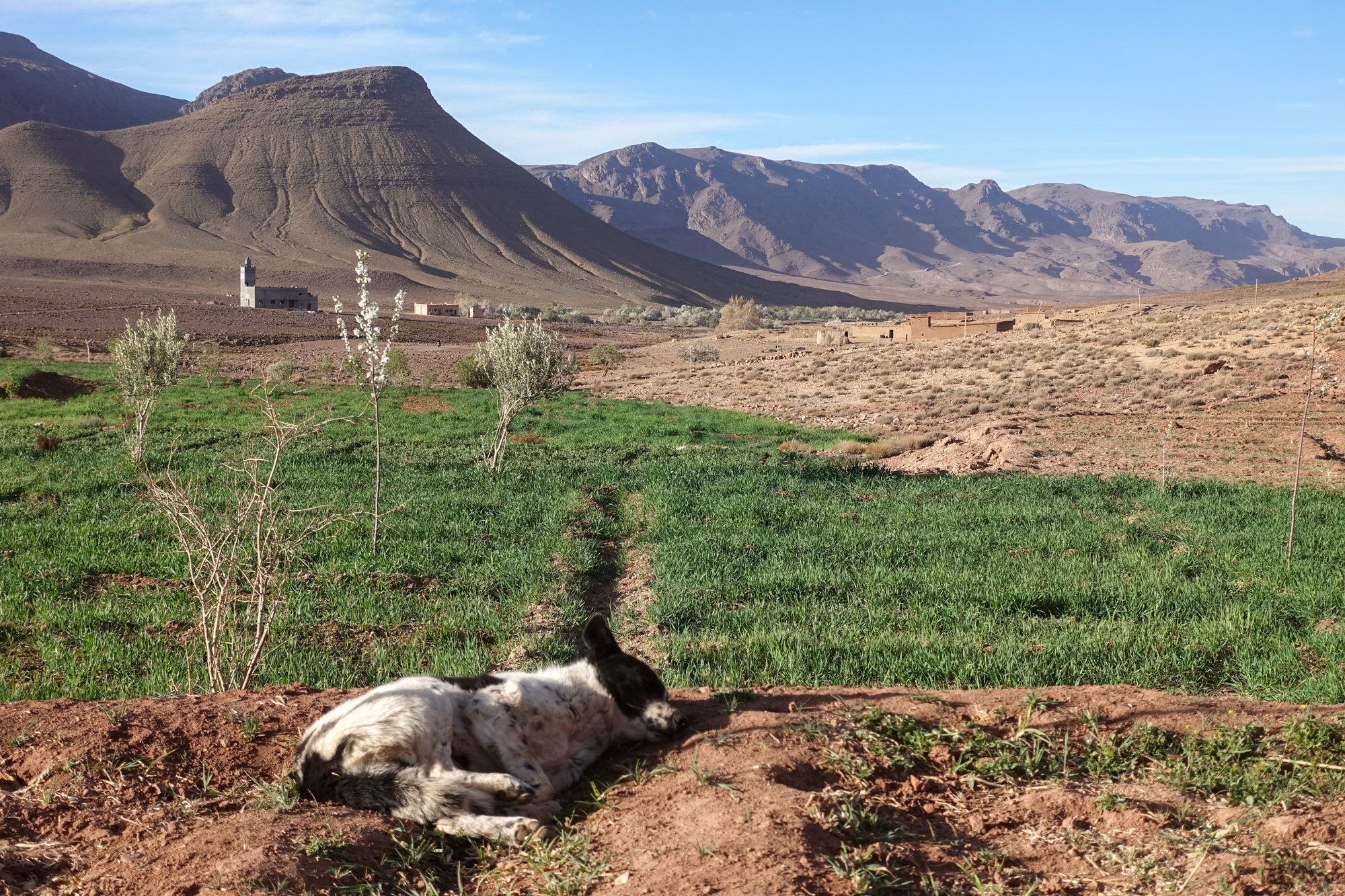
Dog lying down with the Jbel Saghro in the background

The Ait Atta originated as a political entity in the Jbel Saghro region in the 16th century. The earliest mention of the Ait Atta by a European author was by Marmol Carvajal in 1571 where he referred to them as the "Ytata". They are of Sanhaja origin.

According to the anthropologist David Hart, the notion that the Ait Atta originated from the Sahara is unlikely even though some clans like the Ignaouen and Massufa are probably of Saharan origin. Ait Atta tradition asserts that their origin and heartland is from the Jbel Saghro. When the Ait Atta were first in the Saghro, all they knew was tents and a restricted form of sheep nomadism. They saw pastoralism and war as cardinal virtues looking down on agriculture which only became a part of their lives when they expanded and adopted the use of permanent housing from the sedentary Haratin who lived in the areas they conquered.

=== Expansion and conflict with other tribes ===
Map of the expansion of the Ait Atta

Initially the Ait Atta moved north towards the Central Atlas across the Tizi Mqqurn Pass. When the Ait Atta established a foothold in the Central Atlas, they entrenched a contingent of the Ait Bu Iknifen clan at the Tizi n-Ilisi near Zawiya Ahansal and further contingents from the same clan and two other clans: Ait Yazza and Ait Unibgi at Msirmir and Usiskis. The next direction they went was to the west but they did not get far. Their expansion to the north was stopped by the formation of the Ait Yafelman by several Berber tribes like the Ait Haddidou who opposed the expansion of the Ait Atta. Raids, skirmishes and battles between the Ait Atta and Ait Yafelman went on for several centuries from the 17th to 20th centuries. For example, Charles de Foucauld while travelling through the region in 1884 heard reports of a bloody battle between 8,000 Ait Atta and 12,700 Ait Murghad (one of the tribes of the Ait Yafelman) where 1,600 Ait Atta and 400 Ait Murghad died.

In the south and east, subgroups of the Ait Atta established raaya (protection agreements) with the sedentary communities, who were mostly made up of Haratin and racially mixed cultivators, in the areas they conquered. They also had large raiding parties as late as the first decade of the 20th century who entered the Sahara and targeted the camel-herding tribes that lived there like the Berabish and Reguibat. During the 19th century, the region between the lower Ziz and Touat largely became part of the Ait Atta sphere of influence. This was mostly due to the Ait Khabbash sub tribe which belonged to the Ait Unibgi khoms. Unlike other subtribes of the Ait Atta, the Ait Khabbash was nomadic year round and they acquired a warlike reputation.

The expansion of the Ait Atta was often opposed not just by the Ait Yafelman but the Alaouite makhzen. Some authorities argued that the Ait Yafelman was formed by the makhzen to check Ait Atta power which caused the Ait Atta to be hostile to the Alaouites. Until their pacification by the French, the Ait Atta were an integral part of Bilad es-Siba. The first major clash between the Ait Atta and the forces of Moulay Ismail was in 1678 after several brothers and cousins of the sultan supported by the Ait Atta revolted against him. By the late 18th century, Ait Atta contingents were already in Tafilalt. Many more came throughout the 19th century when the continuous Ait Atta battles with the Ait Yafelman reached their peak. By the 19th century the Ait Atta's raids went as far as Touat (in modern-day Algeria).

=== Conflict with the French ===
The Ait Atta expansion was mostly successful until 1899 to 1901 when the Ait Khabbash first encountered the French who occupied the oasis of Touat at the end of 1899. Because of French probing operations south of the Atlas, Moulay Hassan, sultan of Morocco, shifted the traditional policy of the makhzen from supporting the Ait Yafelman against the Ait Atta to reconciliation with the Ait Atta and especially the Ait Khabbash. During 1892, several delegations of Ait Atta nobles largely from the Ait Khabbash and shurfa visited the Royal Palace and Court in Fez. The Act of Algeciras in 1906 and rising French pressure in Morocco caused the alarm in the southeast and the Ait Khabbash sent a delegation to Fez in June 1911 with a letter directed at the British consul Sir James Macleod which sought the protection of the British government against the French. The delegation was turned down and the British eventually came to support the French.

One of the imgharen (plural of amghar meaning tribal chief) of the Ait Atta n-Umalu, Muha u-Sa'id l-'Attawi, started to lead one of the two intertribal harkas that formed in August 1910 and threatened the French rearguard at Dar Shafa'i. This harka was made up of the Beni Moussa (a tribe belonging to Tadla) and "Berber" tribesmen and they totalled 2,000 to 3,000 men on foot and 1,000 horsemen. l-Attawi unsuccessfully attempted to incorporate two other Tadla tribes, the Beni Zemmour and Sma'ala which caused the French to be concerned. The French attempted to buy off l-'Attawi but it failed. l-'Attawi, however, came into conflict with the Sid of Buj'ad over who should act as the mediator between the Tadla tribes with the French benefitted from this infighting.

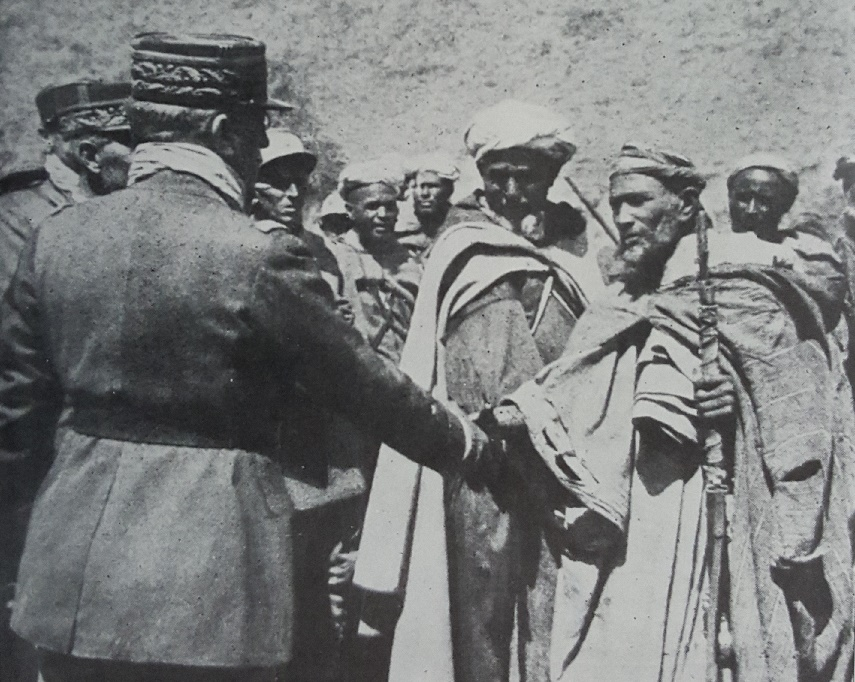
Assou Oubasslam and General Huré meeting, marking the end of the Battle of Bougafer

The Ait Atta's fierce resistance against the French entry into Morocco until 1933 was famous especially for the Ait Atta's valour during the Battle of Bougafer under the forces of Assou Oubasslam. The Battle of Bougafer was the final battle that the Ait Atta fought and one of the hardest the French fought during their pacification of Morocco. The men who were prepared to stay resisting rallied at Taghya n-Ilimshan and they moved south into the Jbel Saghro. Assou Oubasslam's reputation for toughness, directness and truthfulness was already known to the French and the three French generals in charge of finally defeating the Ait Atta offered to give him what he wanted but he rejected their offers. The French used Ait Atta tribesmen who already submitted to fight against Oubasslam's forces which meant that there were low casualty figures for French officers. Eventually, people started to surrender and defect and after the third defection, Assou Oubasslam with his Ilimshan decided to negotiate. On March 25, they laid down their arms in front of General Antoine Huré, Georges Catroux and Henri Giraud and surrendered. In order to appease the Ait Atta, the French authorities allowed the villages and gardens the Ait Atta conquered from neighbouring groups to be legitimately granted to them by the protectorate.

The French colonial authorities instituted a policy of "Fixation" (sedentarization) against nomadic tribes of the Ait Atta like the Ait Khabbash forcing nomads to settle down in villages so men could be recruited into the French Army and work in lead mines owned by French companies. The lands of pastoral nomads were converted into military zones when the French colonial authorities redesigned administrative territories of south-eastern Morocco. Forcibly settling nomads not only made the collection of taxes easier but it restricted the movement of the Muqawama (armed resistance). The French called this policy "pacification of Berber tribes". After Morocco gained independence in 1956, the Moroccan government also implemented policies of sedentarization.

=== Population ===
French author Georges Spillmann estimated the Ait Atta at a population of 38,000 in 1936. David Hart instead estimated them at double that putting them at 76,000 in 1939. He estimated the population to be about 125,000 to 135,000 in 1960. Ethnologist Claude Lefébure estimated their population in 2008 to be 400,000.

== Socio-political organisation ==
=== Khams Khmas ===
The Ait Atta was first divided into five fifths or khams khmas and each fifth or khums was subsequently divided into taqbilts (subtribes) which were divided into ighs amaggran (clans) then ighs ahzzan (lineages) and finally sublineages. These groups would claim descent from a common ancestor and would often be named after that ancestor who would fit somewhere in the family tree of Dadda Atta. An example is the Ait Khabbash whose name means "People of Khabbash" and who descend from the common ancestor Khabbashi or Khabbash who himself was a descendant of Dadda Atta. The khoms and taqbilts of the Ait Atta are:

Khoms I:

- Aït Wahlim:
  - Aït Hassu
    - Aït Bu Daud
    - Aït Ali u Hassu
    - Aït Attu
    - Uššn
    - Uzligen
    - Aït Izzu
  - Zemru:
    - Ignaouen
    - Ilemšan/Ilamshan
    - Aït Aïssa u Brahim
    - Aït Bu Iknifen

Khoms II:

- Aït Wallal / Aït Ounir:
  - Aït Uzzine
  - Aït Reba
  - Aït Mullah (Masufa)
  - Aït Bu Beker
  - Aït Unar

Khoms III:

- Aït Isful:
  - Aït Ichou
  - Aït Hammi
  - Aït Brahim u Hammi
  - Aït Bab Ighef
- Aït Alwan:
  - Aït Ghenima
  - Aït Unzar
  - Aït Bu Messaud
  - Aït Sidi

Khoms IV:

- Aït Unibgi:
  - Aït Khabbash
  - Aït Umnast
  - Beni Mhamed (Arab tribe under the Ait Atta)

Khoms V:

- Aït Aïssa Mzim:
  - Aït Yazza
  - Aït Khalifa
  - Aït el Fersi
  - Aït Kherdi

=== Annual Rotation and Complementarity ===
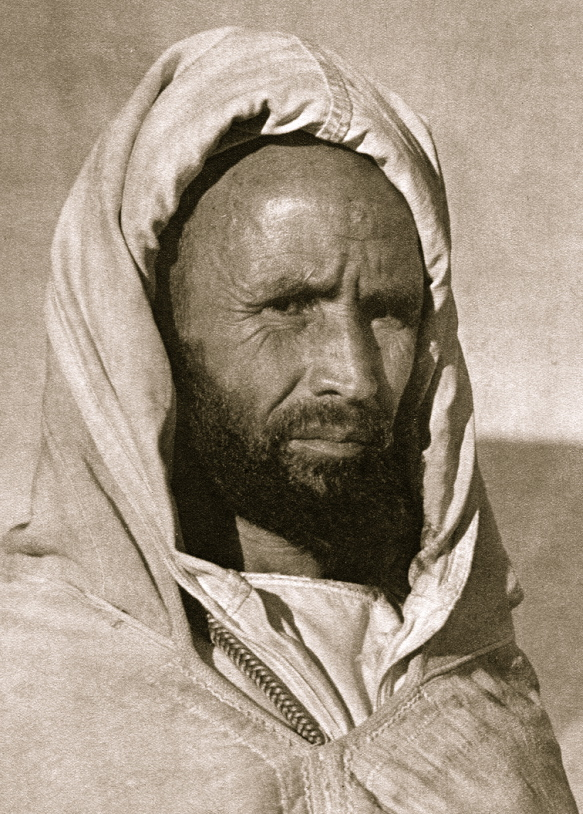
Assou Oubasslam was amghar n-ufilla and qaid of the Ait Atta until his death. His father was previously the amghar n-tamazirt of the Ilamshan.

The sub-tribes and the further divisions each elected their own leaders called amghar n-tamazirt (lit. 'the chief from above') but there was no leader at the head of a fifth. The supreme chief of the Ait Atta, called the amghar n-ufilla, was elected each year usually in spring. This system has been referred to as "annual rotation and complementarity" and it was the political system used by other Berber tribes in the Central High Atlas.

Each year candidates would be chosen from a specific fifth or lineage and only the members of the other four fifths would vote for a candidate from the chosen fifth. This system was also used for the lower levels. The election would take place in a place called Adman which is near their capital Igharm Amazdar. This election took place in the presence of a Sharif belonging to the Ouled Moulay Abdallah bin l-Hsain (Dadda Atta was said to be a disciple of Moulay Abdallah bin l-Hsain who founded the zawiya of Tameslouht) referred to as the agurram (meaning religious man or poor Sufi). The agurram would hand the elected chief a bowl of milk and when he began to drink, he would push the chief's face into it so that it spills all over his beard and clothes. After, the agurram would offer the chief some dates and all those present would be offered some milk and a date.

Even though the system meant in theory that the amghar n-ufilla would be elected yearly, a particularly powerful and effective leader could remain as leader for many years while a less lucky one could be removed at any time.

== Culture ==
=== Ahidus ===
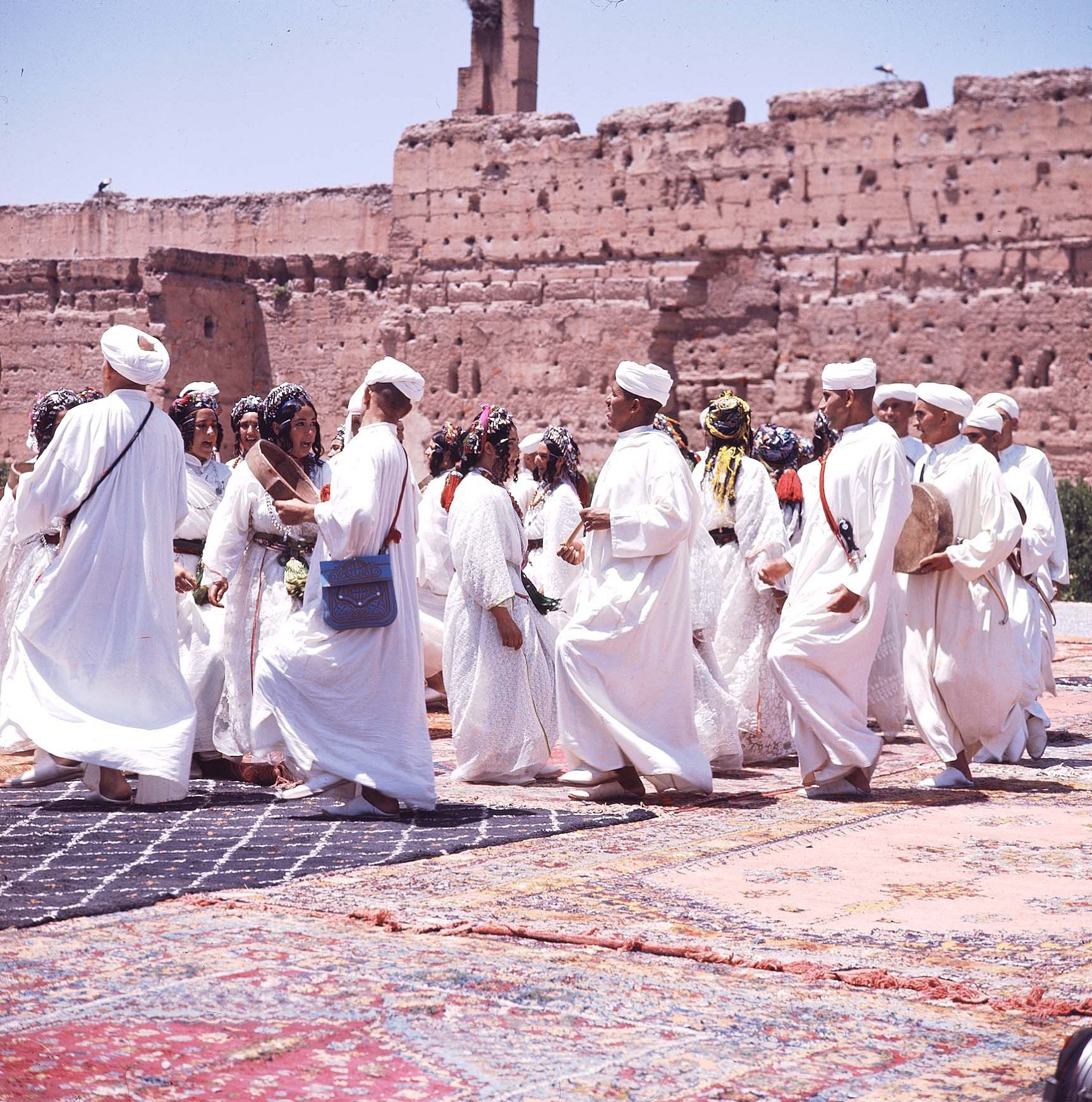
Ahidus dance of the Ait Atta

Ahidus is a traditional Berber collective performance incorporating dance and oral poetry, found among many of the tribes in central and southern Morocco. It is danced and chanted by both women and men. The standard procedure among the Ait Atta is for members of each sex to dance in parallel lines facing each other. Ahidus is commonly done during weddings and naming ceremonies, but sometimes less formal occasions like celebrating full moons. The more people that are performing the Ahidus, the more successful it is seen and Ahidus can at times have a hundred men and women performing at the same time.

Oftentimes unmarried women and divorcees take part in the Ahidus and since the community are aware of who they are, they use this opportunity to find partners. Men and women listen to their singing voices and watch how they dance. Performing Ahidus increases their chance at finding a potential partner. Married women still participate in Ahidus but only on special occasions like weddings.

=== Marriage ===
Before the marriage is accepted, the groom goes to bride's father with a tutra (gift) consisting of two or three cones of sugar, 2 kg of henna, some kohl among other things. If this tutra is accepted, then the marriage (tamghra) will take place. Before Moroccan independence, the marriage contract would be done verbally with the local faqih and eight local important community members who acted as witnesses. After independence, the contract is drawn up in Arabic and signed by the groom and two of his notaries public.

The wedding celebration itself is typically three days long involving a three-day feast called ma'ruf. Some wealthy individuals extend it to six days. The poor only have a one-day feast called timingas. It is not uncommon for multiple marriages to occur at the same time together.

The first day of the wedding is marked by Ahidus dancing and guests begin to arrive at 7pm with the dancing and feasting going on until 4pm. On the first or second day of the wedding the bride mounts a mule, horse or camel to go to her bridal tent and she is accompanied by a group of three or four men called the isnain. A man or boy mounts the animal behind her to steady her. In the case of the Ait Khabbash, the boy must be called Muhammad. During the journey, young men will try to steal from the bride or her mount like her slippers and clothing or the red scarf covering the mount's rump. They would also try to humiliate the isnain into doing things like singing songs in their honour or kissing their hands. The isnain would have to prevent stealing at all costs and they would have to shoot cap pistols or flintlocks loaded with blanks to scare off the young men. If the isnain fail to prevent the bride's clothing from being stolen, they would have to pay. When the bride arrives, the groom sacrifices a sheep in their honour and if they managed to successfully prevent the thieves, they get to keep the meat. Otherwise, they have to give it to the thieves.

When the bride finally arrives, her and her entourage circle the bridal tent three times counter-clockwise. After, she is given a bowl of milk and she takes one sip and sprinkles the rest on the wedding guests. Sociologist Edvard Westermarck notes that this practice is intended to make her future "white" or lucky and art historian Cynthia Becker also links it to fertility.

In most areas, the bride and groom who has generally not seen the bride consummate the marriage and the bride is now unveiled so everyone can see her. The dancing always goes on another night after this to allow the bride and groom to participate. For the Ait Khabbash, the marriage is consummated on the first day of the ceremony. The second day is more festive as the wife's virginity gets proven, the marriage is consummated and everyone relaxes and have fun.

=== Clothing ===
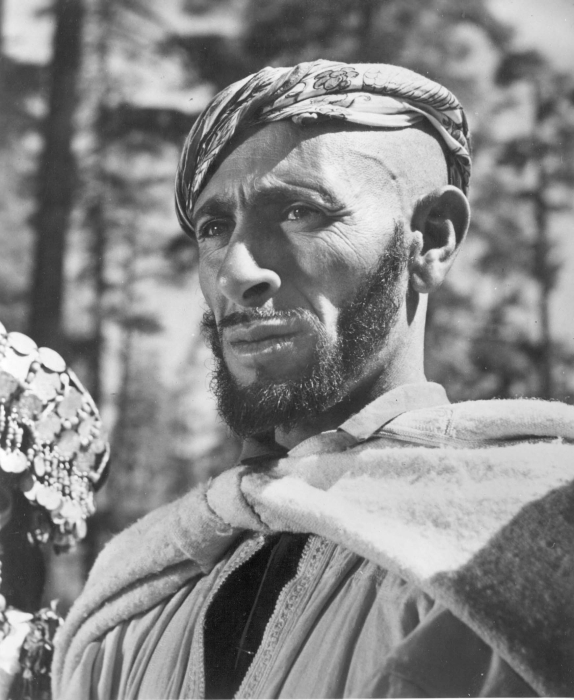
Portrait of an Ait Atta man with beard and turban

Ait Atta men commonly wear white wool cloaks called asilham alongside the striped djellaba, baggy white cotton trousers underneath and leather sandals. They also wear turbans called tikarzit which is made up of white cotton muslin but prior to French pacification they wore a turban called tabakshiut. In the eyes of the Ait Atta, the two distinguishing features of a man is his beard and turban. The colour white is commonly worn in Morocco and represents moral qualities and good fortunes.

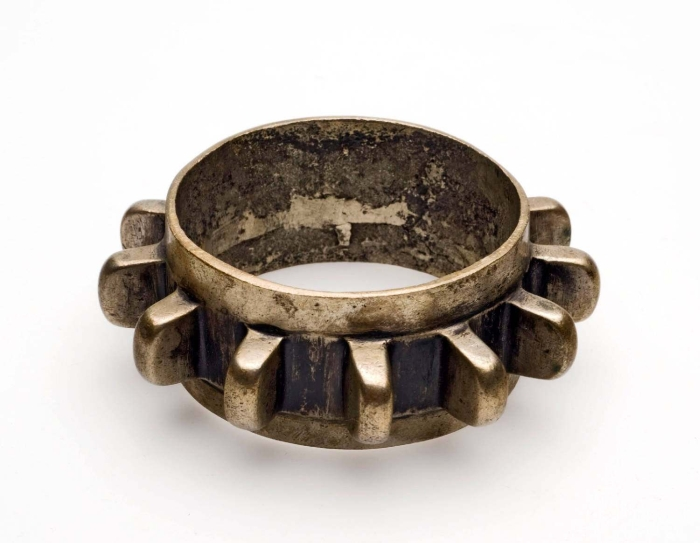
Abzeg bracelet worn by Ait Atta women were originally used by women for self defence during attacks but are now decorative

Ait Atta women wore a triangular headdress called tabugst that had green cords and silver jewellery attached to it. Similarly, the silver bracelets formerly commonly worn by Ait Atta women consist of a series of triangular projections. The triangle was common in Amazigh art forms. One of the styles worn by the Ait Khabbash was called izbian n iqerroin ("bracelets of animal horns") which was made up of a series of triangular pointed projections and worn on both wrists.

Alongside the headdress, Ait Atta women wore a head and body covering alongside it. They wore a necklace of big amber beads and a woollen blanket called ahandir. Each subgroup of the Ait Atta had their own style of covering which was made from indigo-dyed cloth and ahandir to distinguish themselves from one another. Underneath all this they wore baggy women's trousers but this was introduced during the protectorate.

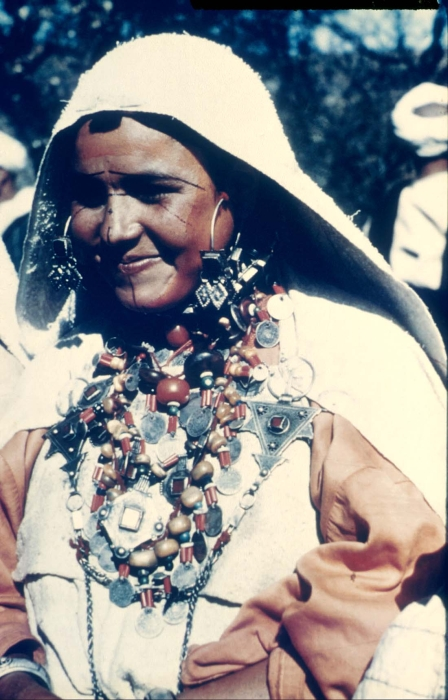
Ait Atta woman with facial tattoos and jewellery

The use of indigo distinguished the Ait Atta from many other Berber groups who wore heavy wool shawls instead. For Berber women living farther north in the Middle and High Atlas, wool shawls were more practical to protect them from the cold. Indigo was thought to have cosmetic and medicinal benefits and the French ethnographer Jean Besancenot referred to Ait Atta women as "blue women" because the colour of the indigo cotton cloth would come off their bodies "giving the skin a bluish tinge which appeals to the women of the south". For Arab and Amazigh women living south of the Atlas mountains and in the Saharan regions, indigo-dyed cotton coverings was preferred and used to protect from the harsh sun and sandstorms.

Some Ait Atta were silver jewellery featuring bird motifs and figures. For example, there is the insersin of the Ait Atta of Tazzarine which is an assemblage of silver money attached to three hooks and has a small cast bird riveted to the central piece of money by a short stem. Another example is a similar bird motif found on hair pendants worn by Berber women in the Dades Valley.

=== Language ===
The Ait Atta speak a dialect of Tamazight that has been referred to as Ait Atta Tamazight. Even though Ait Atta Tamazight is closer to Central Atlas Tamazight, Ait Atta refer to themselves as Tashelhit speakers. An example of Ait Atta Tamazight is found in this excerpt of a folktale transliterated by linguists Simone Mauri and Harry Stroomer:

Transliteration of text

1. Ṣlliw εl nnbi
2. Ḷḷahm ṣlli εlik, a rasul ḷḷah!
3. Inna yaḵ tlla yuwt tmṭṭuṭ ism nns "Lεašiqa". Inn- aḵ ggan zzman, inna yaḵ tili ġur uḡllid iḥkmn xms xmas y ddunit.
4. Aḡllid iḥkmn xms xmas y ddunit?!
5. Yyih, ayy, aḡllid nns ayd iḥkmn akkʷ yan lεadad, lεadad akkʷ y ddunit, ur idd akkʷ mayd ittuqyyasn...Wahli ġurs, wahli bzzaf nniḵ

English translation

1. Pray for the Prophet!
2. May the prayer reach you, O Messenger of Allah!
3. There was a woman whose name was "Lεašiqa." She was once married to the king who ruled the whole world.
4. The king who ruled the whole world?!
5. Yes, yes, it was her king who indeed ruled a large part of the world which could not be measured... He had a lot, his possessions were really enormous.

==== Naming System ====
The Ait Atta use the same naming system as the other Central Atlas Berber tribes (who are collectively known as Imazighen). In this naming system, a man is named as both the son of his father and as a member of the lineage of his patrilateral grandfather or great-grandfather. For example, the name Muha u-Sa'id n-Ait Mhand u-Brahim means "Muha son of Sa'id of the people of Mhand u-Brahim". Here, Mhand u-Brahim could either refer to the patrilateral grandfather or the great-grandfather.

== Law ==
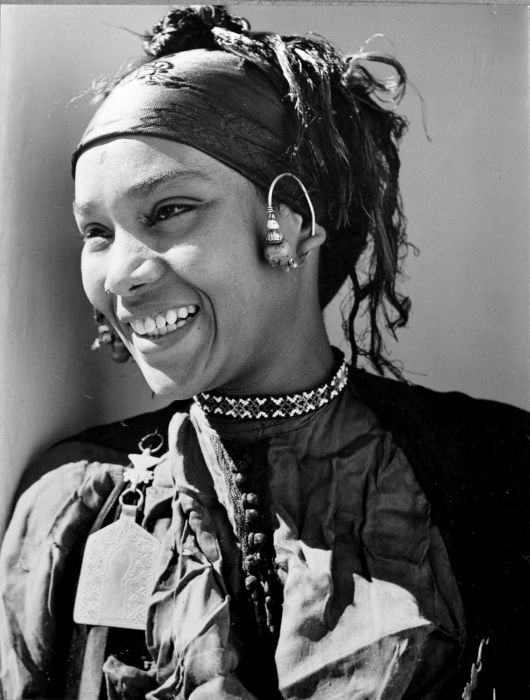
Haratin girl from among the Ait Atta. The Haratin were discriminated against by the Ait Atta who prohibited them from buying land and intermarrying with them

In ordinary circumstances, power traditionally rested mainly with local councils of family heads, the ajmu, who decided cases according to customary law, azerf or taɛqqit. In the oases they conquered, the Ait Atta originally dominated a stratified society, where the Haratin who worked the land were often forbidden from owning it, and needed a protection agreement with an Ait Atta patron; this stratification has considerably receded since Moroccan independence with the establishment of legal equality. David Hart explaining the attitude of the Ait Atta against the Haratin says:

In this sense the Ait Atta are without question the biggest racists in the Moroccan South. They, white tribally-organized, transhumant Berbers who traditionally always bore arms, despise the Haratin for being (1) negroid, (2) non-tribal, (3) sedentary and agricultural, and (4) inexperienced in bearing arms.

— "The Tribe in Modern Morocco: Two Case Studies" in Arabs and Berbers: From Tribe to Nation in North Africa

This attitude was reflected in their pre-Islamic customary law. For example, free blacks were barred from owning land and were subject to other discriminatory laws like the prohibition of selling land and houses to a Hartani which would be punished with a severe fine to both parties. This was related to how land served as the basis by which a social status was defined. They were also not allowed to wear white turbans - a symbol of Ait Atta manhood - as they were deemed to be "like women". Furthermore, they were excluded from political participation in Ait Atta village councils and were denied arms. Sometimes, when an Ait Atta member wanted to test a new weapon, they would use a Hartani as target practice. According to Hart, the Ait Atta claimed to protect the Haratin.

This attitude against the Haratin persisted after independence even until the 1990s as Cynthia J. Becker observed, with members of the Ait Khabbash refusing to intermarry with blacks to preserve the supposed purity of their lineages. They referred to their black neighbours as Ismkhan (singular Ismakh or Ismag) meaning "slave" in Tamazight but also used interchangeably with "black" or "Haratin". The Ismkhan are culturally very similar to their Ait Khabbash neighbours speaking Tamazight, practicing similar marriage ceremonies and having similar art forms. Even despite the discrimination against them, their status is partly elevated by their participation in public healing ceremonies granting them the status of gifted healers possessing special baraka. Similarly, in a 1962 meeting or interview organised by Hart between Ait Atta and Haratin leaders, when the Haratin shaykh claimed that that the Haratin had their own leader elected through annual rotation and complementarity like the Ait Atta, the Ait Atta mqaddim denied this. Things worsened when the Haratin shaykh claimed that they were their own masters and the Ait Atta just sat around cleaning their guns and finally erupted into violence when the Haratin shaykh claimed they were permitted to bear guns in pre-pacification times.

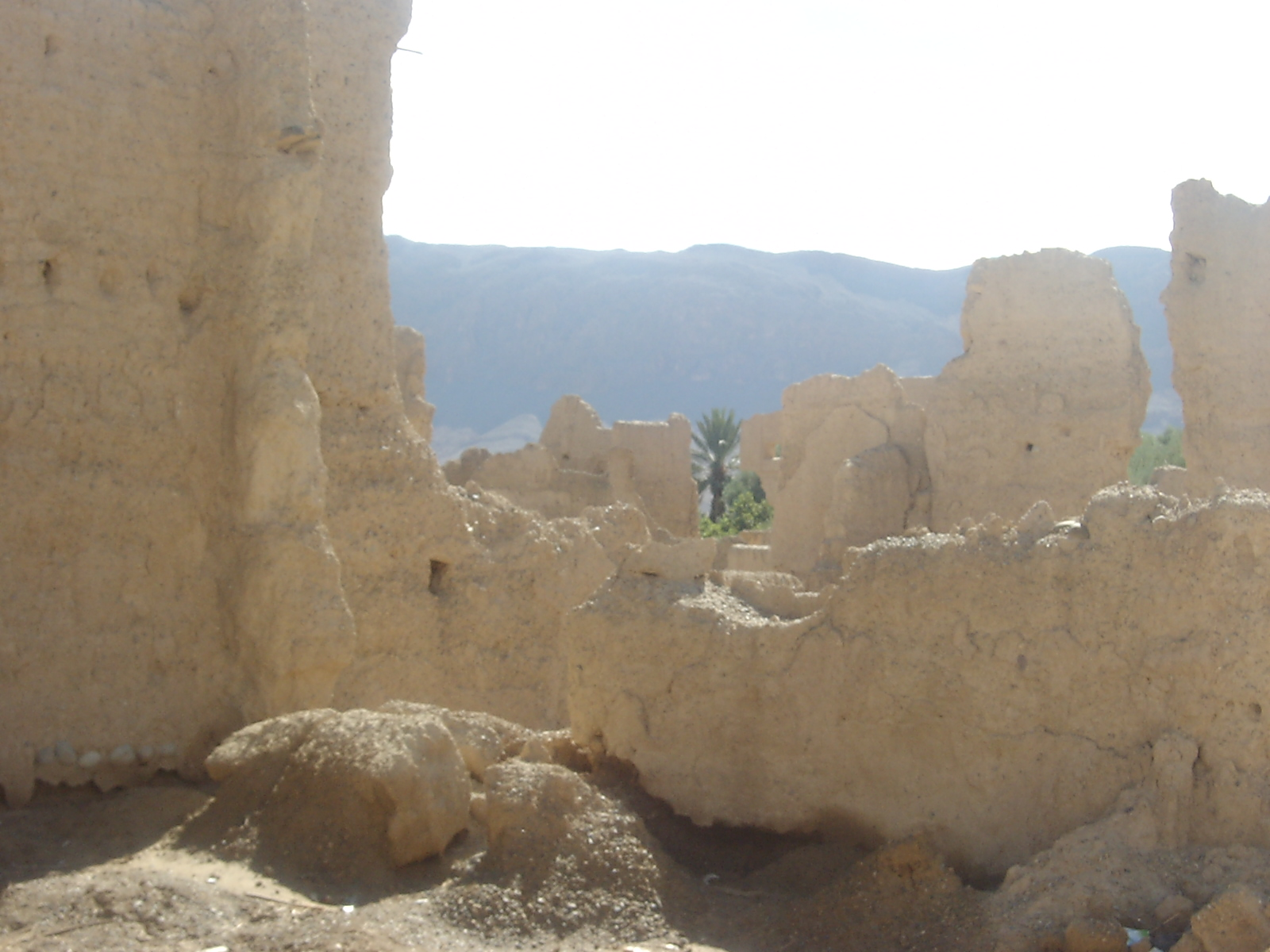
Igharm Amazdar, founded in the late 19th century, served as the capital of the Ait Atta

The Ait Atta Supreme Court of Appeal known as istinaf was located at the capital of the Ait Atta, Igharm Amazdar. The istinaf was made up of six men known as the ti'aqqidin or ait l-haqq (people of the truth) who were rechosen for every case. Two of the six were always chosen from Ait Yazza, two from Ait Zimru and two from Ait Hassu. They would settle any case that could not be solved locally and if they could not agree, they would bring six more arbiters with the same proportion of clans and another six if they still could not. If still an agreement was not made, then the amghar n-tmazirt (clans-chief) of the Ait Aisa n-Igharm Amazdar would come in to tip the scale in favour of one side over the other.

Admam near Igharm Amazdar is where the top Ait Atta chiefs were elected and Tiniurshan is where a local branch of the sharif Moulay Abdullah bin l-Hsain (the patron saint of the Ait Atta who granted them permission to codify their customary law) lived in. This is where they kept their old tribal battle flag and where they kept the two centuries old camel-skin documents Shrut n-khams khmas n-Ait Atta ("Agreements of the Five Fifths").

== Sources ==
- Hart, David (1984). The Ait 'Atta of Southern Morocco Daily Life & Recent History. United Kingdom: Middle East & North African Studies Press. ISBN 978-0-906599-15-0.
- Becker, Cynthia J. (2006). Amazigh Arts in Morocco: Women Shaping Berber Identity (PDF) (1st ed.). Austin: University of Texas Press. ISBN 978-0-292-71295-9.
- Dunn, Ross E. (1973). "Berber Imperialism: the Ait Atta Expansion in Southeast Morocco". In Gellner, Ernest; Micaud, Charles (eds.). Arabs and Berbers From Tribe to Nation in North Africa. Duckworth. pp. 85–109. ISBN 978-0-7156-0639-1.
- Hart, David M. (2000). Tribe and Society in Rural Morocco. London: Routledge. ISBN 978-0-7146-5016-6.
- Munson Jr, Henry (1996). "Rethinking Gellner's Segmentary Analysis of Morocco's Ait ʿAtta". In Hall, John A.; Jarvie, Ian (eds.). The Social Philosophy of Ernest Gellner. Brill. pp. 291–307. doi:10.2307/2803413. ISBN 978-90-04-45747-8. ISSN 0025-1496.
- Ensel, Remco (2022-10-24). Saints and Servants in Southern Morocco. Brill. ISBN 978-90-04-49171-7.
