= Sarah Barringer Gordon =

American historian (born 1955)

Sarah Barringer Gordon (born 1955) is the Arlin M. Adams Professor of Constitutional Law and a professor of history at the University of Pennsylvania. She specializes in the history of American religion and law.

== Life and career ==
Gordon holds an A.B. from Vassar College, J.D. from Yale Law School, M.A.R. (Ethics) from Yale Divinity School and a Ph.D. in history from Princeton University.

== Works ==
- Freedom’s Holy Light: Disestablishment in America, 1776–1876 (forthcoming)
- The Spirit of the Law: Religious Voices and the Constitution in Modern America (Harvard University Press, 2010) ISBN 978-0674046542.
- The Mormon Question: Polygamy and Constitutional Conflict in Nineteenth-Century America (University of North Carolina Press, 2001) ISBN 978-0807849873.
