= Central Atlas Tamazight =

Berber language of central Morocco

- Tamaziɣt
- ⵜⴰⵎⴰⵣⵉⵖⵜ
- Tamazight in Neo-Tifinagh
- Pronunciation: [tæmæˈzɪxt, θæmæˈzɪxθ]
- Native to: Morocco
- Region: Fès-Meknès, Béni Mellal-Khénifra and Drâa-Tafilalet
- Native speakers: 2.7 million (2024)
- Language family: Afroasiatic: Berber; Northern; Atlas; Central Atlas Tamazight
- Standard forms: Standard Moroccan Amazigh
- Writing system: Tifinagh, Arabic

Official status
- Regulated by: IRCAM

Language codes
- ISO 639-3: tzm
- Glottolog: cent2194
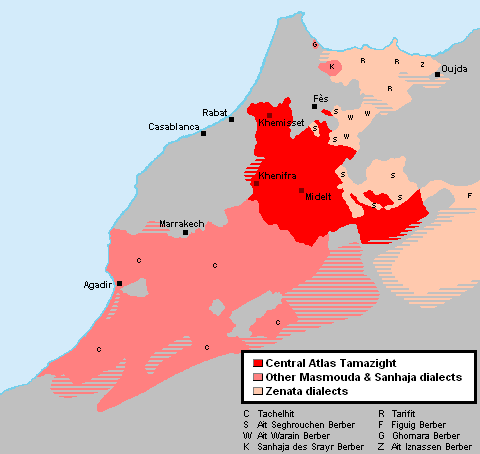
- Location of Central Atlas Tamazight speakers

Central Atlas Tamazight (native name: ⵜⴰⵎⴰⵣⵉⵖⵜ, Tamaziɣt [tæmæˈzɪxt, θæmæˈzɪxθ]; Arabic: أمازيغية أطلس الأوسط) is a Berber language (Note: Central Atlas Tamazight may be referred to as either a Berber language or a Berber dialect. As Berber languages have some degree of mutual intelligibility, there is little consensus on what is considered a "language" and what a "dialect". Additionally, Berber activists like to consider all Berber dialects to be a language to emphasize unity, though this is not entirely linguistically sound (e.g. geographically non-proximate "dialects" may be mutually unintelligible), see Brenzinger (2007:124)) of the Afroasiatic language family spoken by around 2.7 million speakers, or 7.4% of the population of Morocco.

Central Atlas Tamazight is one of the most-spoken Berber languages, along with Tachelhit, Kabyle, Riffian, Shawiya and Tuareg. In Morocco, it comes second as the most-spoken after Tachelhit. All five languages may be referred to as "Tamazight", but Central Atlas speakers are the only ones who use the term exclusively. As is typical of Afroasiatic languages, Tamazight has a series of "emphatic consonants" (realized as pharyngealized), uvulars, pharyngeals and lacks the phoneme /p/. Tamazight has a phonemic three-vowel system but also has numerous words without vowels.

Central Atlas Tamazight (unlike neighbouring Tashelhit) had no known significant writing tradition until the 20th century. It is now officially written in the Tifinagh script for instruction in Moroccan schools, while descriptive linguistic literature commonly uses the Latin alphabet, and the Arabic alphabet has also been used.

The standard word order is verb–subject–object but sometimes subject–verb–object. Words inflect for gender, number and state, using prefixes, suffixes and circumfixes. verbs are heavily inflected, being marked for tense, aspect, mood, voice, person of the subject, and polarity, sometimes undergoing ablaut. Pervasive borrowing from Arabic extends to all major word classes, including verbs; borrowed verbs, however, are conjugated according to native patterns, including ablaut.

== Classification ==
Central Atlas Tamazight is one of the four most-spoken Berber languages, together with Kabyle, Tachelhit, and Riffian, and it comes second as the most-spoken Berber language after Tachelhit in Morocco. Differentiating these dialects is complicated by the fact that speakers of other languages may also refer to their language as 'Tamazight'. The differences between all three groups are largely phonological and lexical, rather than syntactic. Tamazight itself has a relatively large degree of internal diversity, including whether spirantization occurs.

Central Atlas Tamazight speakers refer to themselves as Amazigh (pl. Imazighen), an endonymic ethnonym whose etymology is uncertain, but may translate as "free people". The term Tamazight, the feminine form of Amazigh, refers to the language. Both words are also used self-referentially by other Berber groups, although Central Atlas Tamazight speakers use them regularly and exclusively. (Note: Using ⟨gh⟩ for [ɣ] when embedding Berber words in English text follows the tradition set by French-language publications, even those written by Berbers Goodman (2005:xii). The name "Tamazirt" results from French transcription of Tamazight /ɣ/ with the letter ⟨r⟩, which in French represents the similar-sounding phoneme /ʁ/. Cf. Souag (2004))

In older studies, Central Atlas Tamazight is sometimes referred to as "Braber" / "Beraber", a dialectical Arabic term, or its Tamazight equivalent "Taberbrit". This is related to the Standard Arabic and English term "Berber", used to refer to all Berber dialects/languages, though eschewed by many Berbers because its etymology is pejorative.

Tamazight belongs to the Berber branch of the Afroasiatic language family; Afroasiatic subsumes a number of languages in North Africa and Southwest Asia including the Semitic languages, the Egyptian language, and the Chadic and Cushitic languages. Along with most other Berber languages, Tamazight has retained a number of widespread Afroasiatic features, including a two-gender system, verb–subject–object (VSO) typology, emphatic consonants (realized in Tamazight as pharyngealized), a templatic morphology, and a causative morpheme /s/ (the latter also found in other macrofamilies, such as the Niger–Congo languages). Within Berber, Central Atlas Tamazight belongs, along with neighbouring Tashelhiyt, to the Atlas branch of the Northern Berber subgroup.

Tamazight is in the middle of a dialect continuum between Riff to its northeast and Shilha to its southwest. The basic lexicon of Tamazight differs markedly from Shilha, and its verbal system is more similar to Riff or Kabyle. Moreover, Tamazight has a greater amount of internal diversity than Shilha.

Tamazight's dialects are divided into three distinct subgroups and geographic regions: those spoken in the Middle Atlas mountains; those spoken in the High Atlas mountains; and those spoken in Jbel Saghro and its foothills. Although the characteristic spirantization of /b/ > [β]; /t/ > [θ] or [h]; /d/ > [ð]; /k/ > [ç] or [ʃ]; and /ɡ/ > [ʝ], [ʃ] or [j] is apparent in Berber languages in central and northern Morocco and Algeria, as in many Middle Atlas dialects, it is more rare in High Atlas Tamazight speakers, and is absent in Tamazight speakers from the foothills of Jbel Saghro. Southern dialects (e.g. Ait Atta) may also be differentiated syntactically: while other dialects predicate with the auxiliary /d/ (e.g. /d argaz/ "it's a man"), Southern dialects use the typically (High Atlas, Souss-Basin rural country, Jbel Atlas Saghro) auxiliary verb /g/ (e.g. /iga argaz/ "it's a man"). The differences between each of the three groups are primarily phonological.

Groups speaking Tamazight include: Ait Ayache, Ait Morghi, Ait Alaham, Ait Youb, Marmoucha, Ait Youssi, Beni Mguild, Zayane, Ait Zemmour, Ait Rbaa, Ait Seri, Guerouane, Ait Segougou, Ait Yafelman, Ait Sikhmane, Ayt Ndhir (Beni Mtir). (Note: (/ajt~/ literally means "children of ~", see Abdel-Massih (1971b:118))

There is some ambiguity as to the eastern boundary of Central Atlas Tamazight. The dialect of the Ait Seghrouchen and Ait Ouarain tribes are commonly classed as Central Atlas Tamazight, and Ait Seghrouchen is reported to be mutually intelligible with the neighbouring Tamazight dialect of Ait Ayache. Genetically, however, they belong to the Zenati subgroup of Northern Berber, rather than to the Atlas subgroup to which the rest of Central Atlas Tamazight belongs, and are therefore excluded by some sources from Central Atlas Tamazight. The Ethnologue lists another group of Zenati dialects, South Oran Berber (ksours sud-oranais), as a dialect of Central Atlas Tamazight, but these are even less similar, and are treated by Berber specialists as a separate dialect group.

== History ==
The Berbers have lived in North Africa between western Egypt and the Atlantic Ocean since before recorded history began in the region about 33 centuries ago. By the 5th century BC, the city of Carthage, founded by Phoenicians, had extended its hegemony across much of North Africa; in the wake of the Punic Wars, Rome replaced it as regional hegemon. The Central Atlas region itself remained independent throughout the classical period, but occasional loanwords into Central Atlas Tamazight, such as ayugu, "plough ox", from Latin iugum, "team of oxen" and aẓalim "onion" < Punic bṣal-im, bear witness to their ancestors' contact with these conquerors.

Arabs conquered the area of modern-day Morocco and Algeria around the 7th century, prompting waves of Arab migration and Berber adoption of Islam. Particularly following the arrival of the Banu Hilal in modern-day Tunisia in the 11th century, more and more of North Africa became Arabic-speaking over the centuries. However, along with other high mountainous regions of North Africa, the Middle Atlas continued to speak Berber.

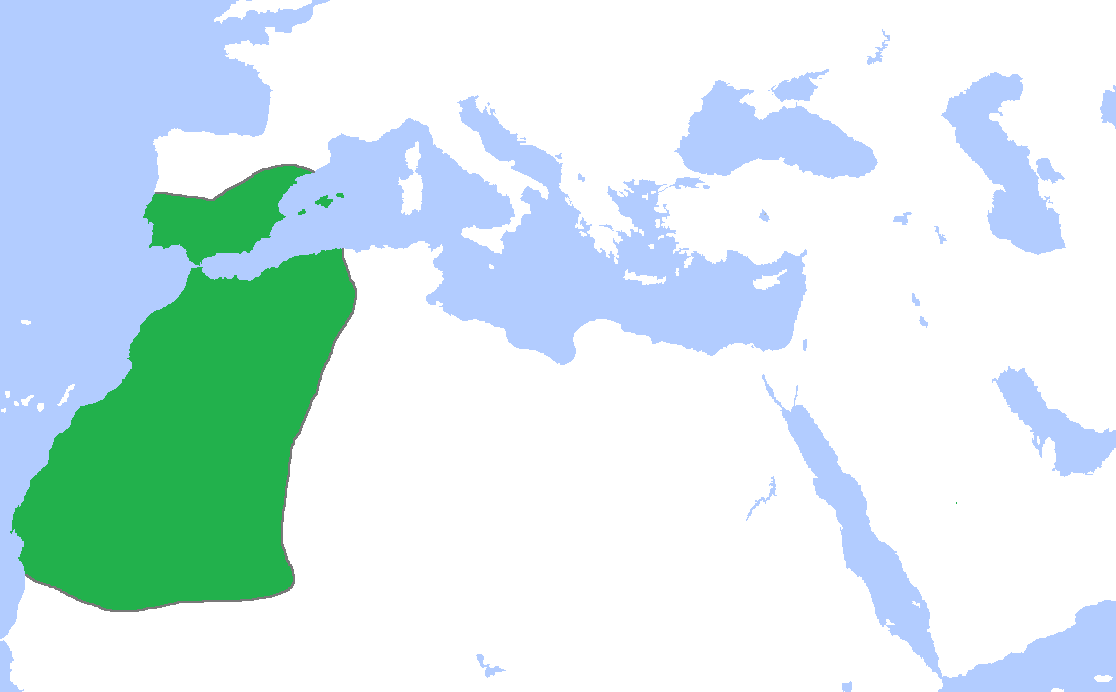
The Almoravid dynasty (green) at its greatest extent, c. 1120.

Between the 12th and 15th centuries, the Central Atlas, along with the rest of Morocco, successively fell within the domain of the Moorish Almoravid, Almohad, and Marinid dynasties. Since the 17th century the region has acknowledged the rule of the Alaouite Dynasty, the current Moroccan royal family. However, effective control of the region was limited; until the 20th century much of the Central Atlas was in a condition of siba, recognising the spiritual legitimacy of royal authority but rejecting its political claims. The expansion of the Ait Atta starting from the 16th century brought Tamazight back into the already Arabised Tafilalt region and put other regional tribes on the defensive, leading to the formation of the Ait Yafelman alliance.

The 1912 Treaty of Fez made most of Morocco a French-Spanish protectorate (under French and Spanish military occupation), leaving the Alaouite monarchy but establishing a French military presence in the Atlas region and installing a French commissioner-general. However, the Berber tribes of the Middle Atlas, as in other areas, put up stiff military resistance to French rule, lasting until 1933 in the case of the Ait Atta.

After Morocco's independence in 1956, a strong emphasis was laid on the country's Arab identity, and a national Arabic language educational system was instituted, in which Berber languages, including Middle Atlas Tamazight, had no place. However, in 1994 the government responded to Berber demands for recognition by decreeing that Berber should be taught and establishing television broadcasts in three Berber languages, including Central Atlas Tamazight. For the promotion of Tamazight and other Berber languages and cultures, the government created the Royal Institute of Amazigh Culture (IRCAM) in 2001.

== Geographic distribution ==
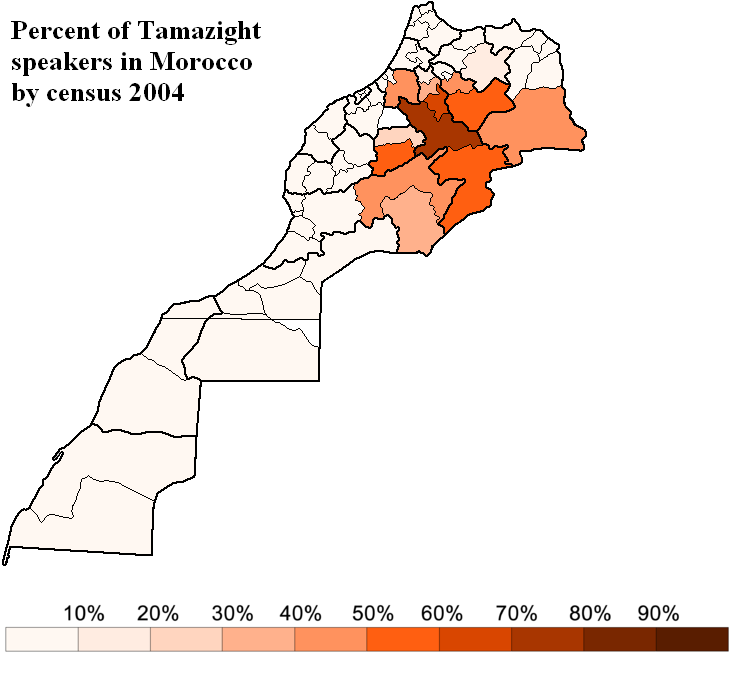
Percent of Tamazight speakers in Morocco by the 2004 census. Based on data found, Central Atlas Tamazight is among the four most-spoken Berber languages (the other three being Kabyle, Shilha, and Riff), and rivals Shilha as the most-spoken Berber language in Morocco.

Central Atlas Tamazight is mostly spoken in the entire Middle Atlas and its outcroppings, reaching east to Taza and west to the region near Rabat. It is also spoken in the central and eastern High Atlas mountains in Morocco. It is thus spoken across areas with widely varying ecological conditions — from the mountainous and forested regions of the Middle Atlas mountains to the oases of the northwestern Sahara (Tafilalt). Berber in Morocco is spread into three areas: Riff in the north, Central Atlas in the center, and Shilha in the south/southwest. Central Atlas is mutually intelligible with the dialects Riff and Shilha; but Shilha- and Riff-speakers cannot understand each other, although transitional varieties exist between these dialects, creating a smooth transition.

Figures for the number of speakers of Berber languages are generally a matter of estimates rather than linguistic censuses. At least a third of Moroccans seem to speak Berber languages,. (Note: André Basset estimated in 1952 that a "small majority" of Morocco's population spoke Berber, see Basset, André (1952), "La langue berbère", Handbook of African Languages, Part I, London: Oxford University Press) (Note: According to the Ethnologue (by deduction from its Moroccan Arabic figures), the Berber-speaking population should be estimated at 35% or around 10.5 million speakers. However, the figures provided for individual languages only add up to 7.5 million, divided into the three dialects as follows: Riff at 1.5 million speakers in 1991; Shilha at 3 million speakers in 1998; and Central Atlas Tamazight at 3 million in 1998, which would give Central Atlas 40%, Shilha 40%, and Riff 20% of the total. See "Languages of Morocco". SIL International. "Tarifit". SIL International. "Tachelhit". SIL International. "Tamazight, Central Atlas". SIL International.) Tamazight is estimated to be spoken by about 40~49% of Morocco's Berber-speakers, while Shilha commands 32~40% and Riff 20~25%.

== Status ==
Tamazight, along with other Berber languages of Morocco, has a low sociolinguistic status, used mainly in the home, and rarely in official or formal contexts. Media broadcasts and music are available in it, and there is a policy of teaching it in schools, although it is not always applied.

Of the Central Atlas Tamazight speakers, 40–45% are monolingual, while the others use Arabic as a second language. Monolingual speakers consist mostly of older generations and children. Women are more likely to be monolingual than men, since they typically stay in the village while the men go to work in the cities. Since Tamazight is the language of the home, girls grow up speaking Berber languages and pass them on to their children — this gender stratification helps to preserve the language. Bilingual Berber speakers have learned Moroccan Arabic via schooling, migration, media, or through the government. Most rural Berber children are monolingual. They struggle to succeed in schools where the teachers do not speak Berber, and require them to learn both Arabic and French.

Rural Morocco, including the Central Atlas area, suffers from poverty. Tamazight along with its relative Shilha are undergoing "contraction" as rural families, motivated by economic necessity, move to cities and stop speaking Tamazight, leading many intellectuals to fear Berber language shift or regression. However, Tamazight speakers are reported to immigrate less than many other Berber groups. Moreover, Tamazight has a large enough body of native speakers not to be considered under risk of endangerment, although Tamazight speakers reportedly have a lower birth rate than the country of Morocco as a whole.

=== Official status ===
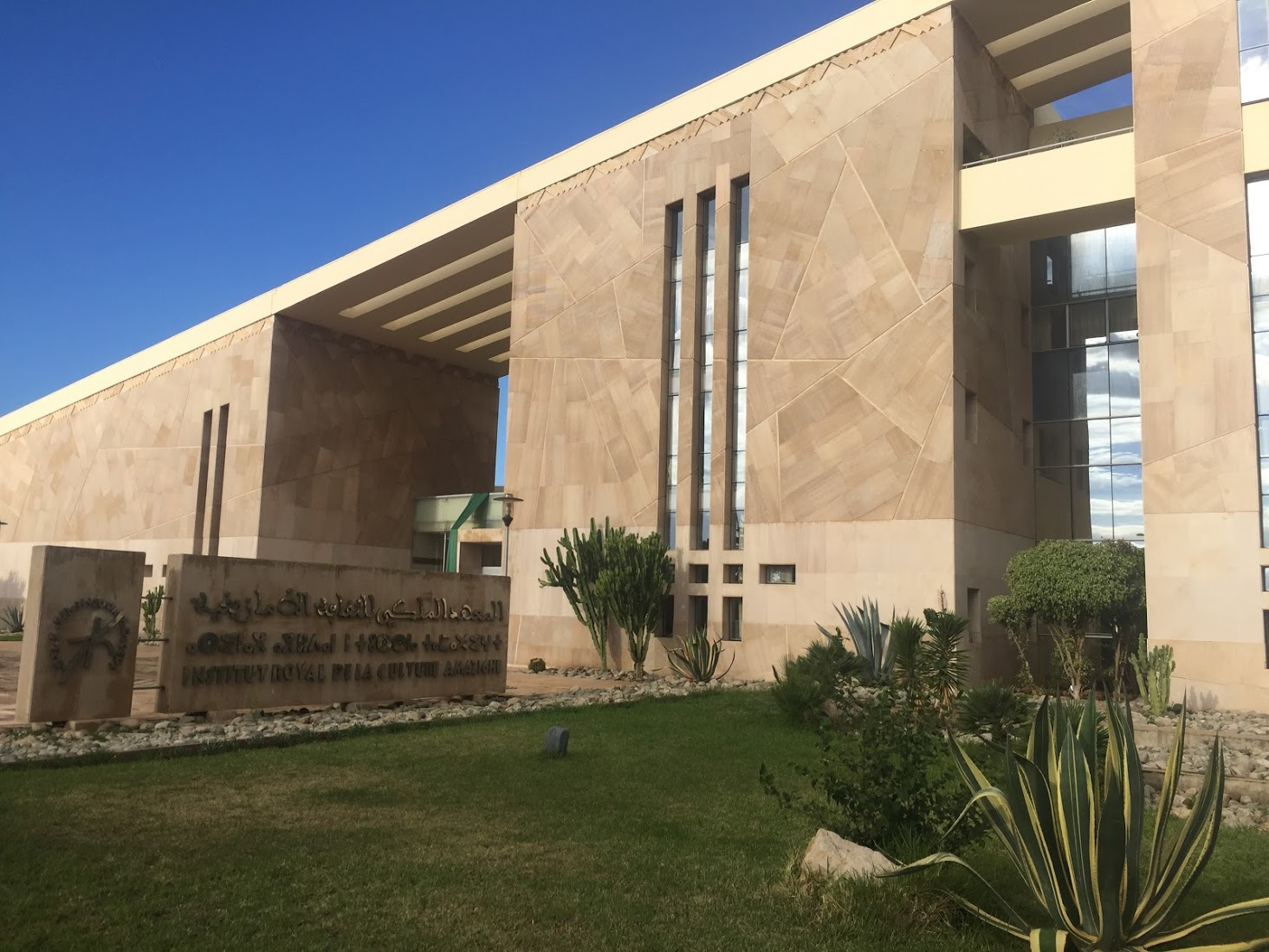
The IRCAM (Institut Royal de la Culture Amazighe) in Rabat

As of the Moroccan constitutional referendum, 2011, the Berber languages are official in Morocco alongside Arabic. In 1994, King Hassan II declared that a national Berber dialect would acquire a formal status; television broadcasts are summarized in Tamazight, as well as Shilha and Rif, three times a day; and educational materials for schools are being developed. On October 17, 2001 King Mohammed VI sealed the decree (Dahir 1–01–299) creating and organizing the Royal Institute of Amazigh Culture (IRCAM). IRCAM's board is composed of Amazigh experts, artists, and activists, all of whom are appointed by the king. The institute, located in Rabat, has played an important role in the establishment of the Tifinagh script in Morocco. There are multiple political parties and cultural associations in Morocco that advocate for the advancement of Berber, calling for it to be recognized as an official language, used more extensively in the mass media, and taught more in schools.

A legal issue affecting Tamazight speakers is restrictions on naming - Moroccan law stipulates that first names must have a "Moroccan character", and uncommon names, including some Berber ones used in the Central Atlas, are often rejected by the civil registry.

== Orthography ==
Tamaziɣt in Tifinagh

Until the 20th century Tamazight, like many other Berber languages but in contrast with neighbouring Tashelhiyt, was basically unwritten (although sporadic cases, using Arabic script, are attested.) It was preserved through oral use in rural areas, isolated from urban hubs. Scholars from the Middle Atlas, as elsewhere in North Africa, usually wrote in the more prestigious Arabic language, rather than their vernacular.

At present three writing systems exist for Berber languages, including Tamazight: Neo-Tifinagh, the Latin alphabet and the Arabic script. To some extent, the choice of writing system is a political one, with various subgroups expressing preference based on ideology and politics. The orthography used for government services including schooling is Neo-Tifinagh, rendered official by a Dahir of King Mohammed VI based on the recommendation of IRCAM. However, various Latin transcriptions have been used in a number of linguistic works describing Central Atlas Tamazight, notably the dictionary of Taïfi (1991).

== Phonology ==
=== Consonants ===
Central Atlas Tamazight has a contrastive set of "flat" consonants, manifested in two ways:

- For front segments, pharyngealization: /tˤ dˤ sˤ zˤ lˤ nˤ rˤ/)
- For back segments, labialization: /xʷ ɣʷ qʷ χʷ ʁʷ/)

Note that pharyngealization may spread to a syllable or even a whole word. Historically Proto-Berber only had two pharyngealized phonemes (/dˤ, zˤ/), but modern Berber languages have borrowed others from Arabic and developed new ones through sound shifts. In addition, Tamazight has uvular and pharyngeal consonants, as well as a lack of /p/ in its plosive inventory, unusual globally but characteristic of the region. (Note: [p] is missing from about 10% of languages that have a [b]. (See voiced velar plosive for another such gap.) This is an areal feature of the "circum-Saharan zone" (Africa north of the equator plus the Arabian Peninsula). It is not known how old this areal feature is, and whether it might be a recent phenomenon due to Arabic as a prestige language (Arabic lost its /p/ in prehistoric times), or whether Arabic was itself affected by a more ancient areal pattern. It is found in other areas as well; for example, in Europe, Proto-Celtic is reconstructed as having [b] but no [p]. Nonetheless, the [p] sound is very common cross-linguistically.)

All segments may be geminated except for the pharyngeals /ʕ ħ/. In Ayt Ndhir, which is a dialect of Tamazight with spirantization, the consonants that can be spirantized appear in their stop forms when geminated, and additionally the geminate correspondents of /ʁ, dˤ, ʃ, ʒ, w, j/ are usually /qː, tˤː, t͡ʃː, d͡ʒː, ɣʷː, ɣː/ respectively. However some native Berber words have /ʁː/ (not /qː/) where other dialects have singleton /ʁ/, and similarly for /ʃː, ʒː/. In addition, in Arabic loans singleton non-spirantized [b, t, tˤ, d, k, ɡ, q] occur (though [b t d] and to an extent [tˤ] often alternate with their spirantized versions in loans), giving this alternation marginal phonemic status.

Tamazight consonants (Ayt Ayache)
		Labial	Alveolar		Palatal	Velar		Uvular		Pharyngeal^{3}	Glottal^{3}
		Labial	plain	phar.	Palatal	plain	labial	plain	labial	Pharyngeal^{3}	Glottal^{3}
Nasal		m	n	nˤ							
Plosive	voiceless		tʰ	tˤ		k^{1}		q	qʷ		
Plosive	voiced	b	d	dˤ		ɡ^{1}					
Fricative	voiceless	f	s	sˤ	ʃ	(x)	xʷ	χ	(χʷ)	ħ	h
Fricative	voiced	(β)	z	zˤ	ʒ	(ɣ)	ɣʷ	ʁ	(ʁʷ)	ʕ	
Approximant			l	lˤ	j		w				
Trill			r	rˤ							

- /k ɡ/ are fricatives /x ɣ/ in the Ayt Ayache dialect.
- /χʷ ʁʷ/ are rare; native speakers can freely substitute /χ ʁ/.
- For a small number of speakers, /b/ is sometimes lenited to [β].
- /t/ is aspirated.

Phoneme	Example	Gloss	Phoneme	Example	Gloss	Phoneme	Example	Gloss
/m/	/ma/	'what?'	/n/	/ini/	'say!'	/b/	/bab/	'owner'
/t/	/isalt/	'he asked him'	/d/	/da/	'here'	/tˤ/	/tˤalˤb/	'to demand'
/dˤ/	/dˤmn/	'to guarantee'	/k/	/ks/	'to tend sheep'	/ɡ/	/iɡa/	'he did'
/xʷ/	/xʷulː/	'all'	/ɣʷ/	/aɣʷːa/	'a burden'	/q/	/iqrˤːa/	'he confessed'
/qʷ/	/iqʷmːrˤ/	'he gambled'	/f/	/fa/	'to yawn'	/s/	/sus/	'to shake off'
/z/	/zːr/	'to pluck'	/sˤ/	/sˤbrˤ/	'to be patient'	/zˤ/	/zˤdˤ/	'to weave'
/ʃ/	/ʃal/	'to buy grain'	/ʒ/	/ʒhd/	'to be strong'	/χ/	/χulf/	'to be different'
/ʁ/	/ʁal/	'to think'	/χʷ/	/aχʷmːas/	'sharecropper'	/ʁʷ/	/ʁʷzif/	'tall'
/ħ/	/ħml/	'to flood'	/ʕ/	/ʕbd/	'to adore, worship'	/h/	/ha/	'here is, are'
/j/	/jːih/	'yes'	/w/	/waχːa/	'all right'	/l/	/la/	'no'
/lˤ/	/lˤazˤ/	'hunger'	/r/	/rdm/	'to demolish'	/rˤ/	/rˤdˤu/	'to bless'

=== Vowels ===
Tamazight has a typical phonemic three-vowel system:

	Front	Central	Back
Close	i		u
Open		a	

These phonemes have numerous allophones, conditioned by the following environments:

(# denotes word boundary, C̊ denotes C_{[−flat −/χ/ −/ʁ/]}, Ç denotes C_{[+flat]}, G denotes {Ç, /χ/, /ʁ/})

Tamazight vowel allophony
Phoneme	Realization	Environment	Example	Gloss
/i/	[i]	#_C̊	/ili/	'to exist'
/i/	[ɨ]	#_C̊ː or C̊ː_	/idːa/	'he went'
/i/	[ɪ] [e]	_G or G_	/dˤːiqs/	'to burst out'
/i/	[ɪj]	C̊_#	/isːfrˤħi/	'he made me happy'
/u/	[u]	#_C̊ or C̊(ː)_C̊	/umsʁ/	'I painted'
/u/	[ʊ] [o]	_G or G_	/idˤurˤ/	'he turned'
/u/	[ʊw]	C̊(ː)_#	/bdu/	'to begin'
/a/	[æ]	#_C̊(ː) or C̊(ː)_C̊	/azn/	'to send'
/a/	[ɐ]	C̊(ː)_#	/da/	'here'
/a/	[ɑ]	_Ç or Ç_	/ħadˤr/	'to be present'

Phonetic schwa

There is a predictable non-phonemic vowel inserted into consonant clusters, realized as [ɪ̈] before front consonants (e.g. /b t d .../) and [ə] before back consonants (e.g. /k χ .../). It is voiced before voiced consonants and voiceless before voiceless consonants, or alternatively it can be realized as a voiced or unvoiced consonant release. It also may be realized as the syllabicity of a nasal, lateral, or /r/.

The occurrence of schwa epenthesis is governed morphophonemically. These are some of the rules governing the occurrence of [ə]:

(# denotes word boundary, R denotes /l r m n/, H denotes /h ħ ʕ w j/, ℞ denotes R or H, and B denotes not R or H.)

Tamazight schwa epenthesis
Environment	Realization	Example	Pronunciation	Gloss
#C(ː)#	əC(ː)	/ɡ/	[əɡ]	'to be, to do'
#RC#	əRC or RəC	/ns/	[əns] ~ [nəs]	'to spend the night'
#CC#	CəC	/tˤsˤ/	[tˤəsˤ]	'to laugh'
#CːC#	əCːəC	/fːr/	[əfːər]	'to hide'
#BBC#	BBəC	/χdm/	[χdəm]	'to work'
#BBC#	BBəC	/zʕf/	[zʕəf]	'to get mad'
#℞C℞#	ə℞Cə℞ or #℞əCə℞#	/hdm/	[əhdəm] ~ [hədəm]	'to demolish'
#℞℞C#	℞ə℞əC	/dˤmn/	[dˤəmən]	'to guarantee'

Examples:

- /tbrˤːmnt/ > [tbərːəmənt] ('you (fp) turned')
- /datːħadˤar/ > [datːəħadˤar] ('she is present')
- /ʕadˤːrˤ/ > [ʕadˤːərˤ] ('to meet')

However note that word-initial initial /j, w/ are realized as /i, u/ before consonants. In word-medial or -final position [əj], [əʝ], and [əw] are realized as [ij], [ij], and [uw] respectively, and may become [i] and [u] in rapid speech.

Tamazight in fact has numerous words without phonemic vowels, and those consisting entirely of voiceless consonants will not phonetically contain voiced vowels. (Note: Audio recordings of selected words without vowels in Shilha can be downloaded from "Selected samples of 24 vowel-less, voiceless words in Tashlhiyt Berber". Archived from the original on 2009-03-20..)

[ə] is written as ⟨ⴻ⟩ in neo-Tifinagh and as ⟨e⟩ in the Berber Latin alphabet. French publications tended to include [ə] in their transcriptions of Berber forms despite their predictability, perhaps due to the French vowel system. This can cause problems because alternations such as /iʁ(ə)rs/ 'he slaughtered' – /uriʁris/ 'he did not slaughter' would then have to be morphologically conditioned.

=== Stress ===
Word stress is non-contrastive and predictable, and falls on the last vowel in a word (including schwa).

Examples:

- /sal/ > [ˈsal] ('to ask')
- /dajtːħadˤarˤ/ > [dajtːəħaˈdˤarˤ] ('he is present')
- /fsːr/ > [fəsːˈər] ('to explain')
- /tfsːrnt/ > [təfəsːəˈrənt] ('you (fp) explained')

== Grammar ==
Central Atlas Tamazight grammar has many features typical of Afro-Asiatic languages, including extensive apophony in both the derivational and inflectional morphology, gender, possessive suffixes, VSO typology, the causative morpheme /s/, and the use of the status constructus.

=== Morphology ===
Tamazight nouns are inflected for gender, number, and state. Singular masculine nouns usually have the prefix /a-/, and singular feminines the circumfix /t...t. Plurals may either involve a regular change ("sound plurals"), internal vowel change ("broken plurals"), or a combination of the two. Masculine plurals usually take the prefix /i-/, feminines /ti-/, and sound plurals also take the suffix /-n/ in the masculine and /-in/} in the feminine, but many other plural patterns are found.

Examples:

/axam/ → /ixamn/ 'big tent(s)' (m)
/amaziɣ/ → /imaziɣn/ 'Berber(s)' (m)
/adaʃu/ → /iduʃa/ 'sandal(s)' (m)
/asrdun/ → /isrdan/ 'mule(s)' (m)
/taxamt/ → /tixamin/ 'tent(s)' (f)
/tafunast/ → /tifunasin/ 'cow(s)' (f)
/taɡrtilt/ → /tiɡrtal/ 'mat(s)' (f)
/tamazirt/ → /timizar/ 'property(ies)' (f)

Nouns may be put into the construct state (contrasting with free state) to indicate possession or when the subject of a verb follows the verb. This is also used for nouns after numerals and some prepositions, as well as the conjunction /d-/ ('and'). The construct state is formed as follows: in masculines, initial /a/ becomes /u, wː, wa/, initial /i/ becomes /i, j, ji/, and initial /u/ becomes /wu/. In feminines, initial /ta/ usually becomes /t/, initial /ti/ usually becomes /t/, and initial /tu/ remains unchanged.

Examples (in Ayt Ayache):

/babuxam/ ( ← /axam/) 'head of the house'
/ijːs ntslit/ ( ← /tislit/) 'the horse of the bride'

Central Atlas Tamazight's personal pronouns distinguish three persons and two genders. Pronouns appear in three forms: an independent form used in the subject position, a possessive suffix (and a derived independent possessive pronoun), and an object form affixed (Note: prefixed or suffixed depending on multiple factors) to the controlling verb.

Demonstrative pronouns distinguish between proximate and remote. When they occur independently, they inflect for number. They may also be suffixed to nouns: /tabardaja/ 'this pack-saddle'.

Tamazight subject affixes
Person			(Ayt Ayache)	(Ayt Ndhir)
s	1		/...-ɣ/	/...-x/
s	2		/t-...-d/	/θ-...-ð/
s	3	m	/i-.../	/j-.../
s	3	f	/t-.../	/θ-.../
pl	1		/n-.../	
pl	2	m	/t-...-m/	/θ-...-m/
pl	2	f	/t-...-nt/	/θ-...-nθ/
pl	3	m	/...-n/	
pl	3	f	/...-nt/	/...-nθ/

Central Atlas Tamazight verbs are heavily inflected and are marked for tense, aspect, mode, voice, person, and polarity. Tamazight verbs have at their core a stem, modified by prefixes, suffixes, moveable affixes, circumfixes, and ablaut. The prefixes indicate voice, tense, aspect, and polarity, while the suffixes indicate mood (normal, horatory, or imperative). Subject markers are circumfixed to the verb, and object marking and satellite framing are accomplished via either prefixing or suffixing depending on environment Some verb forms are accompanied by ablaut, and sometimes metathesis.

Pronominal complement markers cliticize to the verb, with the indirect object preceding the direct object:/iznz-as-t/ "he sold it to him".

Attributive adjectives occur after the noun they modify and are inflected for number and gender. Adjectives may also occur alone in which case they become an NP. Practically all adjectives also have a verbal form used for predicative purposes, which behaves just like a normal verb.

/argaz amʕdur/ 'the foolish man' (lit. 'man foolish')
/tamtˤut tamʕdur/ 'the foolish woman'
/irgzen imʕdar/ 'the foolish men'
/tajtʃin timʕdar/ 'the foolish women'
/i-mmuʕdr urgaz/ 'the man is foolish' (lit. '3ps–foolish man')
/argaz i-mmuʕdr-n/ 'the foolish man' [using a non-finite verb]

Prepositions include /xf/ ('on'), /qbl/ ('before'), /ɣr/ ('to'), and the proclitics /n/ ('of') and /d/ ('with, and'). (Note: /n/ and /d/ assimilate to some initial consonants: e.g. /ʃa lːħlib/ 'some milk'), /aɣjul tːfunast/ 'the donkey and the cow'.) They may take pronominal suffixes. Some prepositions require the following noun to be in the construct state, but others do not.

=== Syntax ===
Word order is usually VSO (with the subject in construct state) but is sometimes SVO (with the subject in free state), e.g. (/ifːɣ umaziɣ/ vs. /amaziɣ ifːɣ/ 'the Berber went out'). Tamazight also exhibits pro-drop behavior.

Tamazight may use a null copula, but the word /ɡ/ 'to be, to do' may function as a copula in Ayt Ayache, especially in structures preceded by /aj/ 'who, which, what'.

wh- questions are always clefts, and multiple wh-questions (Note: such as the English "who saw what?", see Stoyanova (2004:174–175)) do not occur. Consequently, Tamazight's clefting, relativisation, and wh-interrogation contribute to anti-agreement effects, (Note: when the verb does not agree with, or agrees in a relative manner with wh-words, see Richards (2004:18).) similar to Shilha, and causes deletion of the verbal person marker in certain situations.

== Vocabulary ==
As a result of relatively intense language contact, Central Atlas Tamazight has a large stratum of Arabic loans. Many borrowed words in Berber also have native synonyms (/lbab/ or /tiflut/ 'door'), with the latter being used more in rural areas. The contact was unequal, as Moroccan Arabic has not borrowed as much from Berber languages, but Berber has contributed to the very reduced vowel systems of Moroccan and Algerian Arabic.

Arabic loans span a wide range of lexical clasees. Many nouns begin with /l-/, from the Arabic definite prefix, and some Arabic feminines may acquire the native Berber feminine ending /-t/, e.g. /lʕafit/ for /lʕafia/ 'fire'. Many Arabic loans have been integrated into the Tamazight verb lexicon. They adhere fully to inflectional patterns of native stems, and may even undergo ablaut. Even function words are borrowed: /blli/ or /billa/ 'that', /waxxa/ 'although', /ɣir/ 'just', etc.

The first few (1–3 in Ayt Ayache and Ayt Ndhir) cardinal numerals have native Berber and borrowed Arabic forms. (Note: In Ayt Ayache the Arabic numerals are used only for counting in order and for production of higher numbers when combined with the tens, see Abdel-Massih (1971b:22)) All higher cardinals are borrowed from Arabic, consistent with the linguistic universals that the numbers 1–3 are much more likely to be retained, and that a borrowed number generally implies that numbers greater than it are also borrowed. The retention of one is also motivated by the fact that Berber languages nearly universally use unity as a determiner.

Central Atlas Tamazight uses a bipartite negative construction (e.g. /uriffiɣ ʃa/ 'he did not go out'), which was apparently modelled after proximate |Arabic varieties, in a common development known as Jespersen's Cycle. It is present in multiple Berber varieties and is argued to have originated in neighbouring Arabic varieties and to have been adopted by contact.

== Examples ==
English	Tamazight (Ayt Ayache)
Hello	/sːalamuʕlikːum/ (to a man by a man) /ʕlikːumsːalam/ (response)
Hello	/lˤːahiʕawn/ (to or by a woman) /lˤːajslːm/ (response)
Good morning	/sˤbaħ lxirˤ/
Good evening	/mslxirˤ/
Good night	/ns jlman/ (to m.s. or f.s.) /mun dlman/ (response)
Good night	/nsat jlman/ (to m.p.) /tmunm dlman/ (response)
Good night	/nsint jlman/ (to f.p.) /tmunt dlman/ (response)
Goodbye	/lˤːajhnːikː/ (to m.s.) /lˤːajhnːikːm/ (to f.s.) /lˤːajhnːikːn/ (to m.p.) /lˤːajhnːikːnt/ (to f.p.) /tamanilːah/ (response)

== See also ==
- Languages of Morocco
- Shilha language

== Notes ==
(from "[nb 1]")

== Bibliography ==
- Abdel-Massih, Ernest T. (1968). Tamazight Verb Structure. Bloomington: Indiana University. ISBN 0-87750-160-2.
- Abdel-Massih, Ernest T. (1971a). A Course in Spoken Tamazight. Ann Arbor: University of Michigan. ISBN 0-932098-04-5.
- Abdel-Massih, Ernest T. (1971b). A Reference Grammar of Tamazight. Ann Arbor: University of Michigan. ISBN 0-932098-05-3.
- Becker, Cynthia (2006). "Amazigh textiles and dress in Morocco: metaphors of motherhood". African Arts. 39 (3). Los Angeles: James S. Coleman African Studies Center: 42–55. doi:10.1162/afar.2006.39.3.42.
- Ben-Layashi, Samir (2007). "Secularism in the Moroccan Amazigh Discourse" (PDF). The Journal of North African Studies. 12 (2). Routledge: 153. doi:10.1080/13629380701201741. ISSN 1362-9387. S2CID 143728476. Archived from the original (PDF) on September 23, 2010.
- Bouhjar, Aicha (2008). Amazigh Language Terminology in Morocco or Management of a 'Multidimensional' Variation (PDF). International Conference on Language Resources and Evaluation (LREC). Rabat: IRCAM.
- Brenzinger, Matthias (2007). Language Diversity Endangered. Berlin: Mouton de Gruyter. ISBN 978-3-11-017049-8.
- Chaker, Salem. "Le TAMAZIGHT (Maroc central) – Tamaziɣt" (in French). Paris: INALCO. Archived from the original on December 28, 2009.
- Chaker, Salem (1996). Tira n Tmaziɣt – propositions pour la notation usuelle a base latine du berbere (PDF). Problèmes en suspens de la notation usuelle à base latine du berbère (in French). Paris: INALCO. Archived from the original (PDF) on November 29, 2008.
- Chaker, Salem (2003). Berber, a "long-forgotten" language of France (PDF). Language and (Im)migration in France, Latin America, and the United States: Sociolinguistic Perspectives. University of Texas at Austin. Archived from the original (PDF) on October 18, 2012.
- El Aissati, Abderrahman (1993). "Berber in Morocco and Algeria: Revival or Decay?" (PDF). AILA Review (Association Internationale de Linguistique Appliquée). 10: 88–109. Archived from the original (PDF) on October 12, 2006.
- El Aissati, Abderrahman (2001). "Ethnic identity, language shift and The Amazigh voice in Morocco and Algeria" (PDF). Race, Gender & Class. 8 (3). Archived from the original (PDF) on December 17, 2020.
- Ennaji, Moha (2005). Multilingualism, Cultural Identity, and Education in Morocco. University of Fés, Morocco. ISBN 0-387-23979-0.
- Goodman, Jane E. (2005). Berber culture on the world stage: from village to video. Bloomington: Indiana University. ISBN 0-253-21784-9.
- Hoffman, Katherine E. (2006). "Berber language ideologies, maintenance, and contraction: Gendered variation in the indigenous margins of Morocco" (PDF). Language & Communication. 26 (2): 144–167. doi:10.1016/j.langcom.2006.02.003. Archived from the original (PDF) on June 9, 2010.
- Kossmann, Maarten G; Stroomer, Harry J. (1997). "Berber Phonology" (PDF). In Kaye, Alan S (ed.). Phonologies of Asia and Africa. Eisenbrauns. pp. 461–475. ISBN 1-57506-019-1.
- Lucas, Christopher (2007a). Contact-induced grammatical change: towards an explicit account (PDF). UK Language Variation and Change Conference. Lancaster University.
- Lucas, Christopher (2007b). "Jespersen's Cycle in Arabic and Berber" (PDF). Transactions of the Philological Society. 105 (3): 398–431. doi:10.1111/j.1467-968X.2007.00189.x. Archived from the original (PDF) on November 29, 2009.
- Moustaoui, Adil. "Dossier no. 14 – The Amazigh language within Morocco's language policy". Barcelona: Ciemen. Archived from the original on August 27, 2003.
- Penchoen, Thomas G. (1973). Tamazight of the Ayt Ndhir. Los Angeles: Undena Publications. ISBN 0-89003-000-6.
- Prasse, Karl G. (2000). Études berbères et chamito-sémitiques: mélanges offerts à Karl-G. Prasse (in French). Peeters Publishers. ISBN 90-429-0826-2.
- Richards, Norvin (2004). "The Syntax of the Conjunct and Independent Orders in Wampanoag". International Journal of American Linguistics. 70 (4). Massachusetts Institute of Technology: 327–368. doi:10.1086/429206. S2CID 144467035.
- Ross, Samantha (2004). "The Mother Tongue in Morocco: The politics of an indigenous education" (PDF). University of East Anglia. Archived from the original (PDF) on March 19, 2012.
- Sadiqi, Fatima (1986). Studies in Berber Syntax. Würzbug: Königshausen und Neumann. ISBN 3-88479-295-4.
- Souag, Lameen (2004). "Writing Berber Languages: a quick summary". L. Souag. Archived from the original on July 30, 2005.
- Souag, Lameen (2007). The Typology of Number Borrowing in Berber (PDF). CamLing 2007. London: School of Oriental and African Studies. pp. 237–244. Archived from the original (PDF) on February 22, 2012.
- Stoyanova, Marina (2004). "The typology of multiple wh-questions and language variation" (PDF). Proceedings of ConSOLE XII. ConSOLE XII. University of Leiden. pp. 171–184.
- Stoyanova, Marina (2008). Unique focus: languages without multiple wh-questions. Amsterdam & Philadelphia: John Benjamins Publishing Company. ISBN 978-90-272-5506-8.
- van Heelsum, Anja (2002). Explaining trends, developments and activities of Moroccan organisations in the Netherlands (PDF). Sociaal Wetenschappelijke Studiedagen. Amsterdam. Archived from the original (PDF) on February 25, 2007.
