= Ait M'Hamed =

The commune of Ait M'hamed is a predominantly rural commune in the region of Béni Mellal-Khénifra, in Morocco. It takes its name from the name of the "Ait Mhand" tribes that populate it. There are Ait Hamou or Ali, Ait Wamlouk, Ihansalen, Ait Issha, Ait Atta and Sahraouis. The population is dispersed over an area of approximately 300 km2. The only agglomeration is represented by the capital where the weekly souk is held.

It was created in 1960 under No. 03-1-2., located south of the city of Azilal, and limited:

- to the north, by the rural communes of "Ait Mazigh", " Agoudi N'Lkhir" and "Tamda Noumarcid".
- to the south, by the rural communes of "Tabant" and "Ait Abbas".
- to the east, by the rural commune of "Zaouiat Ahansal".
- to the west, by the rural communes of "Ait Taguella" and Wawla".

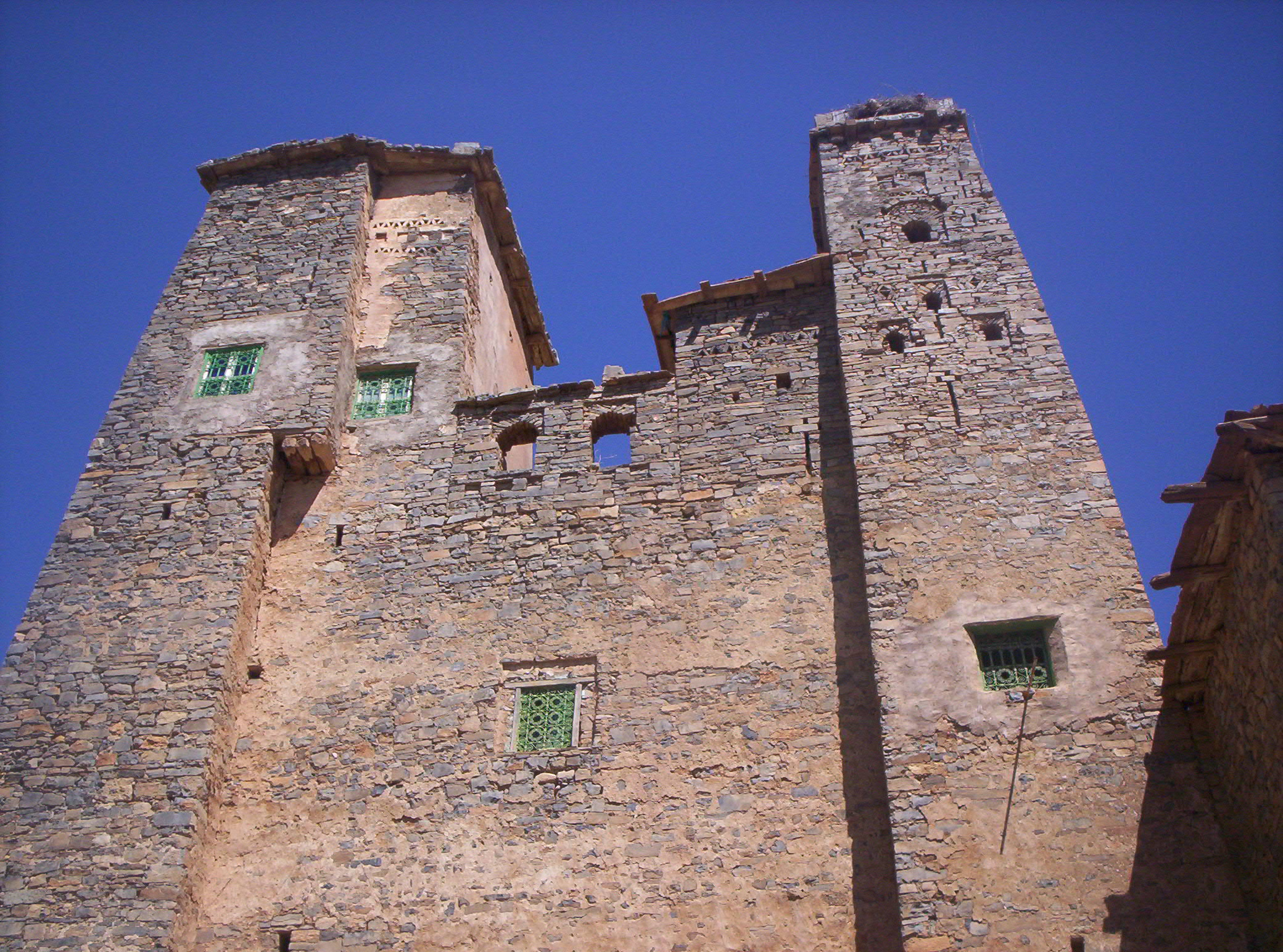
Ait M'hamed fortress of Bernat

.

The capital of the commune is called "Souk Sebt N'Ait M'hamed" which is only 20 km from Azilal. There are 23 electoral districts with 45 localities (douars). The commune is also the capital of the "caidat" of Ait M'hamed since 1936 and recently headquarter of the Circle. It is one of the largest rural communes in the province of Azilal both demographically and territorially.

== Demographics ==
Years	1994	2004	2014	2024	growth rate
population	18888	21742	23696	23531	-0.696%

Years	1994	2004	2014	2024	growth rate
Households	2685	3190	3493	4183	19.75%

== History ==
Several events have marked the history of the rural commune of Ait M'hamed: The pre-colonial era was marked by the "Siba" witch is anarchy in "Darija"(Moroccan language). The "siba" is a discontinuous tribal war opposing the different tribes between them. The Ait M'hand were in confrontation with the "Ntifa" tribe in the west, the "Ait Abbas" and "Ait Bouguemmaz" in the south, the "Ait Outferkal" (Ait Abdellah and Ait Ougoudid) in the north and the "Ihansalen" and "Ait Issha" in the east. The reason for these confrontations was related to natural resources, in particular pastures and water points. In several situations, these resources are still currently common between these tribes, which gives rise to inter-tribal conflicts from time to time.

Some historical events that marked the town:

- 1914 marked the beginning of French colonization, the construction of the colonial office.
- 1917: French stabilization in the region.
- 1944: was marked by the famine that affected the region and forced several families to emigrate to the south. The return was marked by the influx of new families from the Ouarzazate region to settle in the commune.
- 1946 was a year of very good harvest called Âam El Khalf (year of recovery).
- 1957: a large snowstorm that lasted 2 months caused human and livestock damage.
- 1957: the construction of the first classroom in the field of education at the Ait M'hamed town.
- 1967: is marked by an epidemic disease of equines that caused significant damage.
- 1968: Scabies disease was spreading among the population who had never known it (this disease was locally called "Banchachar" at the time).
- 1971-1973: Demarcation of the forest area, which marked the beginning of a chronic conflictual relationship between the population and the water and forest department that continues to this day.
- 1981-1985: Drought caused the emigration of hundreds of families.
- 1992: Beginning of a second cycle of drought years.
- 2017: Start of a third cycle of drought years.
- 2019: The covid-19 pandemic caused the death of many people, especially the elderly.

== Natural environment ==
The commune is characterized by a rugged mountainous relief whose altitude varies between 1400 and 1800 meters. Its climate is semi-continental, very cold in winter, hot in summer with coolness at altitude. The average annual precipitation is 500 mm. The average minimum temperature is 6 °C while the average maximum is 28 °C. Snow can reach 20 to 40 cm in winter. Frost is also frequent especially in early spring. The commune of Ait M'hamed is also known for the frequency of storms in summer with sometimes material and human damage, and cold winds sometimes violent in December and January. The plains and valleys occupy only a small area of 1400 hectares, the plateaus 800 hectares and the mountains occupy 20946 hectares. The types of soil encountered are of the "Harche" type, very little productive, it occupies the vast majority, the lands of the "El-Hamri", "Rmel" and "Tirs" types are rare. Only 11% of the land is arable (irrigated land represents only 1%). Forests occupy 32% of the total surface area of the commune; uncultivated land represents 40%.

== Natural resources ==
=== Forest resources ===
The forest area and rangelands occupy about 90% of the surface area of the rural commune. They constitute the main resource of the population. The way forest resources are managed by the forest service has led to a permanent conflict between the population and the forest. Income-generating activities, non-extensive livestock farming, and the encouragement of renewable energies can be a gateway to participatory forest management.

=== Water resources ===
The rural commune of Ait M'hamed suffers from a clear lack of water resources. It is crossed by 8 "wadis", the majority of which are temporary; two are permanent but their flow is low. The springs are mainly used for the supply of drinking water and the majority of them are not developed. Wells are rare and suffer from a lack of groundwater. As a result, the supply of drinking water is one of the major problems for the population of the commune.

== Economic activities ==
=== Livestock farming ===
This is the main activity of the population, It is dominated by goats followed by sheep, Extensive livestock farming, Livestock farming completely dependent on the forest, Clear lack of supervision, Beekeeping is gaining ground in certain areas.

=== Agriculture ===
Second main activity after livestock farming. Dominated by cereal crops, particularly barley. The irrigated area is very small. Very infertile land with significant erosion. Lack of supervision. Absence of farmers' organizations.

== Emigration ==
In the Ait M'hamed commune, emigration is a general phenomenon for almost all households. It is an inevitable economic means to compensate for the insufficiency of local resources. • Seasonal emigration: All areas are experiencing a movement of the young population to other provinces of the Kingdom in search of daily work. The most affected destinations are: Agadir, Casablanca, Marrakesh, Rabat, Beni Mellal, the northern and southern provinces of Morocco. • Permanent emigration: The number of families who have permanently left the commune is said to be over 350. The main destinations are within the province of Azilal (Afourer, Timoulilt, Ouaouizeght and the city of Azilal) but there are also emigrants outside the province. This phenomenon illustrates the difficulty the population has in stabilizing in the "douars" and the inability of local resources to meet the minimum needs for a decent life.

== Crafts ==
Crafts are very low in the commune, limited to the traditional activity of women to make local carpets, woolen fabrics to make "djellabahs" or even a few craftsmen who use the dwarf palm for the manufacture of some products for domestic use.
