= Assou Oubasslam =

Assou Oubasslam عسو أوبسلام
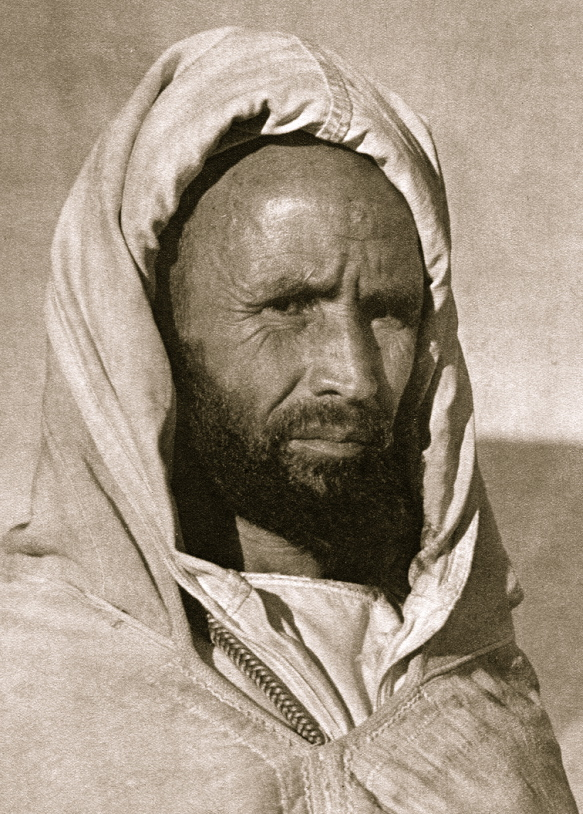
- Born: 1890; Ksar Taghya, Morocco
- Died: 16 August 1960 (aged 69–70) Morocco
- Buried: Imilchan Commune
- Known for: Leader of the Amazigh Resistance in Asamer
- Conflicts: Battle of Bougafer

Assou Oubasslam (Arabic: عسو أوبسلام, romanized: ʿAṣṣū ū-Bā Salām) was an Ait Atta chief who led an armed resistance in southeastern Morocco against French colonization from the occupation of Morocco until the early 1930s.

== Early life and resistance ==
Aissa Ou Ali n Ait Baslam was born in 1890 in Taghya n Ilmchane, south of Tinghir. His father was the leader (amghar n-tmazirt) of the Ilimshan clan of the Ait Atta. He was a charismatic leader, influenced by the leadership role of his father.

In 1919, he was appointed as the tribal leader of the Ilimshan. As the French colonial occupation advanced and posed a threat to the eastern High Atlas, he took command of the Amazigh resistance against the French colonizers and their collaborators. Assou Oubasslam engaged in numerous battles, most notably the Battle of Bougafer in 1933, where he achieved a significant victory against the French.

== Battle of Bougafer ==
In 1932, the Ait Atta tribes gathered at Ksar Taghya and elected Assou Oubasslam as the overall leader of the jihad. With much of Morocco under French occupation, colonial forces attempted to infiltrate southeastern Morocco and subjugate the Saghro region and Ait Atta tribes. The resistance of Assou Oubasslam served as a barrier to their expansion. Assou Oubslam led the I Moroccan resistance against French colonization, engaging in battles that decisively favored the resistance. He inflicted significant losses on the occupying forces and lured the invaders into exhausting battles at locations such as "Taouza", "Al Nif", "Tazarin" and "Naqoub." In 1933, after multiple confrontations, the Battle of Bogafar erupted in the Saghro, Asef Mulul, and Mount Baddou regions in the eastern High Atlas. It ended with the victory of the resistance over the French colonizers.

Thousands of Moroccans lost their lives in this battle, and the French forces employed systematic genocide. The civilian casualties in Bougafer were estimated at four thousand, including children and women. The resistance of Assou Oubasslam only surrendered on March 25, 1933, after enduring a prolonged siege by land and air lasting over 40 days. The resistance of Assou Oubasslam came to an end.

After the Battle of Bougafer, he remained Grand Qaid and amghar n-ufilla of the Ait Atta until his death.

== Death ==
After a prolonged struggle with diabetes, the Moroccan resistance fighter Assou Oubasslam died on August 16, 1960. He was buried in his ancestors' cemetery in the Imilchan Commune.

== See also ==
- Abd el-Krim
- Mouha ou Hammou Zayani
- Ahmed al-Hiba
- Thami El Glaoui
