= Agda =

Agda may refer to:

- Agda (programming language), the programming language and theorem prover
- Agda (Golgafrinchan), the character in The Hitchhiker's Guide to the Galaxy by Douglas Adams
- Liten Agda, the heroine of a Swedish legend
- Agda Montelius, a Swedish feminist
- Agda Persdotter, a Swedish royal mistress of the 16th-century
- Agda Rössel, a Swedish politician
- Agda Östlund, a Swedish politician
- Dayan Agda, a Filipino politician
