= Félix Mora =

French soldier recruiting workers from Morocco to France in the 1950s

- Military career
- Allegiance: France
- Branch: French Army
- Service years: 1926 – ?
- Rank: sergeant
- Unit: French Army in Morocco
- Other work: Recruitment operations in Morocco

Félix Mora was a sergeant in the French Army during World War II. He was known for conducting recruitment operations of Moroccan workers for the Houillères du bassin du Nord et du Pas-de-Calais(fr), also known as HBNPC, a group of coal mining companies in Northern France.

== Biography ==
Félix Mora was born in 1926 in France and was a sergeant in the French Army. He was first responsible for the recruitment and training of Moroccans Tabors for the French Army in Guelmim. He was later hired by HBNPC in 1948 to recruit Moroccan workers from the region of Sous. He died in 1995.

== Recruitment operations in Morocco ==
After he was hired in 1948, Félix Mora operated his first recruitment operation on the behalf of the French General Residence in Morocco between 1948 and 1949. Most recruited Moroccan workers were sent to work in French coal mines in which many French men refused to work.

Mora was behind the recruitment of around 66 thousands Moroccan workers between 1956 and 1970 mainly from the surroundings of Ouarzazate, Tiznit, Guelmim, Tafraout and Agadir. He was supervising the selection of the workers in person, refusing all men under 50 kg or not between 20 and 30 years old.

Recruitment operations continued and peaked between 1955 and the late 1970s.
