= Charles Micaud =

American historian

Charles Antoine Micaud (France, 1910 - Denver, June 23, 1974) was a sociologist, author and American professor. Born in France, he emigrated to the United States in 1936. He was a professor in the universities of Bowdoin College, Virginia and Denver. On 29 March 1941 he married Nancy Waddel.

It was author of works like The French Right and Nazi Germany, 1933-1939 (1943), The Droite devant l'Allemagne (1945), Communism and the French Left. (1963), Tunisia: The Politics of Modernization (1964), between others, in addition to editor of Arabs and Berbers. From tribe to Nation in North Africa (1974), beside Ernest Gellner. He died due to cancer.

== Bibliography ==
- Anonymous (27 June 1974). "Charles Micaud of Or. of Denver, Writer on French Politics, Dies". The New York Times.
- Gallagher, C. F. (1965). "Tunisia: The Politics of Modernization by Charles To. Micaud; Leon Carl Brown; Clement Henry Moore; Government and Politics in Northern Africa by I. William Zartman". International Journal. 20 (2). Sage Publications: 276–278. ISSN 0020-7020.
- Grosser, Alfred (1956). "Neumann (Sigmund) ed. - Modern Political Parties. Approaches to comparative politics. Edited by Sigmund Neumann. Contributors : Frederick C. Barghoorn, Samuel H. Beer, Gwendolen M. Carter, Andrew Gyorgy, Chat To. Micaud, Sigmund Neumann, Felix Oppenheim, Dankwart Rustov, Robert To. Scalapino, And.And. Schattschneider". Revue française of science politique (in French). 6 (4): 920–923. ISSN 1950-6686.
- Heinberg, J. G. (June 1944). "The French Right and Nazi Germany, 1933–1939; To Study of Public Opinion. By Chat To. Micaud. (Durham, N.C.: Duke University Press. 1943. Pp. 255. $3.50.)". American Political Science Review. 38 (3). American Political Science Association: 572–573. doi:10.2307/1948915. ISSN 0003-0554. JSTOR 1948915. S2CID 146776128.
- Miege, Jean-Louis (1974). "Gellner (Ernest) et Micaud (Charles), Arabs and Berbers. From tribe to Nation in North Africa". Revue of l'Occident musulman et of the Méditerranée (in French). 18 (18): 174–175. ISSN 2105-2271.
- Wood, David M. (February 1964). "Communism and the French Left. By Chat To. Micaud. (New York: Frederick To. Praeger, 1963. Pp. xi, 308. $6.00.)". The Journal of Politics. 26 (1). Southern Political Science Association: 266–268. doi:10.2307/2127879. ISSN 0022-3816. JSTOR 2127879.
- Woolbert, Robert Gale (April 1944). "The French Right and Nazi Germany, 1933-1939". Foreign Affairs. Vol. 22, no. 3.
