= Ait Boudaoud =

Place in Morocco

Ait Boudaoud ⴰⵢⵜ ⴱⵓⴷⴰⵡⴷ أيت بوداود
- Location in Morocco
- Coordinates: 30°36′35.4996″N 5°25′33.0384″W
- Country: Morocco
- Region: Drâa-Tafilalet
- Province: Zagora Province

Population (2014)
  - Total: 5,439
- Time zone: UTC+0 (GMT)
- Postcode: 47054
- Area code: +212
- Geocode: 587.03.05

Ait Boudaoud (Arabic: أيت بوداود, Ayt Bu-Dāwud; Tamazight: ⴰⵢⵜ ⴱⵓⴷⴰⵡⴷ) is a small rural commune in Zagora Province. The Ait Boudaoud commune is located within the Agdz district, 80 kilometers from the city of Zagora. It's home to a population of around 5,344 residents.

== Local institutions ==
A weekly outdoor market is held every Thursday.

== Neighboring municipalities ==
- 1. Tazzarine
- 2. Taghbalte
- 3. N'kob
- 4. Ait Ouallal ( Ait Ouzzine)

== See also ==
- List of municipalities, communes, and arrondissements of Morocco
