= Timtig =

Timtig تمتيك
- Location in Morocco
- Coordinates: 30°16′48″N 5°43′48″W
- Country: Morocco
- Region: Drâa-Tafilalet
- Province: Zagora

Population (2014)
  - Total: 2,560
- Time zone: UTC+0 (GMT)

Timtig (Arabic: تمتيك) is a historical village in southeast Morocco which is part of the rural commune of Tamegroute. Its territory is located on the left bank of Oued Draa, 12 km west of the town of Zagora and 7 km east of Tamegroute.

Timtig is a set of five ksours, listed as architectural heritage of Morocco, Otto Kölbl et al. (2007). The principal being Timtig Lahdab which accounts for more than the half of the population. The others are Louastaniya, Ait Boulkhlat, Ait Beloualid and Ait Moulay Lakbir.

== Climate ==
Timtig has a hot desert climate (Koppen classification BWH) typical of the Moroccan desert with long summers, hot and short winters, pleasantly warm. The climate is very dry all year, since the average annual rainfall is about 61 mm. In summer, the heat is extreme and the average temperatures are consistently above 40 °C between late May and mid September. In winter the average maximum temperatures remain above 20 °C but the average minimum temperatures down to about 4 °C overnight. The sky is clear and bright all year and overcast days are very rare.

== Economy ==
Oasis agriculture and remittances from migrant workers to big cities and cattle breeding.
