= Id Bab N Ali =

Id Bab n Ali
- Type: Geological formation

Location
- Location: N'kob
- Coordinates: 31°02′58″N 5°49′00″W
- Region: Draa Tafilalet
- Country: Morocco

Type section
- Location: Saghrou
- Coordinates: 31°9′0″N 5°39′0″W

Id Bab N Ali (in Tamazight ⵉⴷ ⴱⴰⴱ ⵏ ⵄⵍⵉ) is a geological and tourist site located in the Zagora region, specifically in the municipality of N’Kob, Morocco.

== Location ==
The Id Bab Nali site is located near the village of Ousdiden. This site is affiliated administratively with the rural municipality of N’Kob in Zagora, the fifth province of Drâa-Tafilalet region. Id Bab Nali is situated along Regional Road 1521, linking the regions of Tinghir with the ones of Zagora throughout the village of Ikniouen. Moreover, the spot is part of Jbel Saghro's rough and rugged peaks.

== Naming and Myths ==
The name "Id Bab Nali" is attributed to a widely circulated local myth. According to this myth, a family residing in the area had a misbehaving and mischievous son named Ali who would contaminate his food with urine. In punishment, he was transformed into a craggy rock. Additionally, it was believed, his parents, who had failed to properly raise him, were turned into another rough rock adjacent to the first one, their son. The other widely spread rugged rocks in the area, according to the same myth, represent the remaining of "Ali’s Kith and Kin" or "Ali’s Guardians", known in Tamazight as "Id Bab Nali." This is how the site took its name. In accordance with the same enduring myth among the locals, the livestock of the "Ali’s family" and all their belongings were also subject to transformation into numerous rock spires distributed across the area. Other narratives attribute the naming of this site to the intentionally breaking of the fast by Ali's family, or "Id Bab Nali", publicly during Ramadan, and, as a result, the punishment for this deliberate act was transforming the entire family into stones and rocks.

== Cultural and sports events ==
Id Bab Nali has served as a venue for a variety of cultural and sports events. In 2005, this geological and touristic site served as a filming location for the movie "Babel," which was directed by Alejandro González Iñárritu. As part of the Festival of Kasbahs in the village of N’Kob, there is a marathon event that takes the name of this geological site known as “Marathon Id Bab Nali”.

In 2018, Id Bab Nali was chosen as the backdrop for the music video of the French singer Virna Nova's song "Golden Love". Additionally, in February 2020, it witnessed the launch of “Marathon des Sables” (known also as Sahara Marathon), organized under the supervision of Lahcen Ahansal, the former world champion in Sahara marathon. In 2021, a short Moroccan film titled "Arizona Maghribiya" (Moroccan Arizona), by the director Az-Eddine Ait Khiyi, was filmed here. In the same year, the landscapes of Id Bab Nali became the canvas for the creation of the Al Jazeera documentary "In God's Hands", that would later claim an award at the International African Film Festival.
