= Abu Salim al-Ayyashi =

- Born: May 4, 1628
- Died: December 13 or 18, 1679
- Occupation(s): travel writer, poet, lawyer, Sufi scholar

Abu Salim 'Abd Allah ibn Mohammed ibn Abu Bakr al-'Ayyashi (Arabic: أبو سالم العياشي) (May 4, 1628 – December 13 or 18, 1679) was a well-known travel writer, poet, lawyer, and Sufi scholar from Morocco.

== Biography ==
Abu Salim al-'Ayyashi was born on 4 May 1628 in the Berber tribe of Ait Ayyash living in the Middle Moroccan Atlas. His father was the head of a zawiyya. Al-Ayyashi lived and studied in Fez and joined the Sufi order of the Nasiriyya in Tamegroute. He travelled three times to the Hejaz in 1649, 1653 and 1661 and stayed for long periods in Mecca, Medina, Jerusalem and Cairo.

== Works ==
He wrote a two volume rihla about his journeys: Ma’ al-Mawa’id (Table Water). Al-'Ayyashi is, moreover, the author of several further works:

- Manẓuma fi ’l-Buyuʻ, a treatise in verse on sales, with a commentary;
- Tanbīh Dhawī al-Himam ’l-ʻAlīya ʻala al-Zuhd fī ’l-Dunyā al-Fānīya, treatise on Sufism;
- a study on the particle law,
- al-Ḥukm bi-’l-ʻadl wa-al-inṣāf ’l-Dāfiʻ li ’l-khilāf fī-mā waqaʻa bayn baʻḍ Fuqahāʼ Sijlimāsa min al-ikhtilāf
- Iqtifa’ al-Athar ba’d Dhahab Ahl al-Athar, biographical collection;
- Tuḥfat (Itḥāf) al-akhillāʼ bi-ijāzāt al-mashāyikh al-ajillāʼ, biographies of his masters (these last two works probably forming his Fahrasa).
