= Taghbalte =

Place in Morocco

Taghbalte ⵜⴰⵖⴱⴰⵍⵜ تغبالت
- Location in Morocco
- Coordinates: 30°37′12″N 5°21′0″W
- Country: Morocco
- Region: Drâa-Tafilalet
- Province: Zagora Province

Population (20O4)
  - Total: 8,867
- Time zone: UTC+0 (GMT)
- Postcode: 47722
- Area code: +212
- Geocode: 587.03.31

Taghbalte (Arabic: تغبالت, Taḡbālt; Tamazight: ⵜⴰⵖⴱⴰⵍⵜ) is a rural commune in the province of Zagora, in the region of Drâa-Tafilalet, in Morocco. It is located at around 30°37′12″N 5°21′0″W. The total population of Taghbalte according to the 2004 census was about 8,867 people.

== Local institutions ==
The weekly outdoor market (Souk) is held every Monday in the center of the town.

== Neighboring municipalities ==
- 1. Tazzarine
- 2. Ait Boudaoud
- 3. N'kob
- 4. Ait Ouallal ( Ait Ouzzine)

== See also ==
- List of municipalities, communes, and arrondissements of Morocco
