= Mohammed ibn Nasir =

Moroccan theologian and physician (1603–1674)

- Born: January 1, 1603
- Died: January 1, 1674 (aged 71)
- Citizenship: Morocco
- Occupation: Writer

Sidi Mohammed ibn Nasir (Arabic: مْحَمَّد بنَّاصر) or Mohammed ibn Mohammed ibn Ahmed ibn Mohammed ibn al-Hussayn ibn Nasir ibn Amr abu Bakr al-Dar'i al-Aghlani (1603–1674) was a Moroccan Sufi and founder of the Nasiriyya zawiyya of Tamegroute. Sidi Muhammad bin Nasir was a theologian, scholar and physician. He is the father of Ahmed ibn Nasir who also contributed greatly to the Nasiriyya library in Tamegroute.

== Bibliography ==
- Al-Yusi, Index and Muhadarat
- Mohammed ibn at-Tayyib al-Qadiri, Nashr al-Mathani
- Mohammed as-Saghir al-Ifrani al-Marakkushi, As-Safwa
- Muhammad ibn Jaafar al-Kittani, Salwa al-Anfas
- Mohammed ibn Musa ibn Nasir (1179 AH), The Inlaid Pearls on the Righteous Men of Draa
