= Al-Hasan al-Yusi =

Moroccan Sufi writer (1631–1691)

Abu Ali al-Hassan ibn Masud al-Yusi (Arabic: أبو علي الحسن اليوسي) (1631–1691) was a Moroccan Sufi writer. He is considered to be the greatest Moroccan scholar of the seventeenth century and was a close associate of the first Alaouite sultan Rashid.

Of his autobiography, Al-Fahrasa (literally: academic journey), only the introduction and first section have survived and these were, until recently, unpublished. His better known text Al-Muhadrat (Discourses) also contains many autobiographical passages. Both texts are remarkable for the author's frank discussions of childhood misdeeds, the pleasures of his conjugal sex life, and other intimate details of his personal life. Al-Yusi's Daliyya (poem of praise) of his Shaikh Muhammad b. Nasir al-Dari of the Zawiya Nasiriyya of Tamegroute, is famous both in Morocco and West Africa.

== Bibliography ==
- Al-Yusi, Rasa'il Abi 'Ali al Yusi (ed. by Fatima Khalil Qabli), 2 vol., Al Yusi's essays, 1981
- Al-Yusi, Zahr Al-Akam, 3 vol., Proverbs and famous sayings of al-Yusi, 1981
- Al-Yusi, Al-Muhadarat fi al Lugha wa al Adab, (ed. by Muhammad Hajji), Essays and reflections by Al Yusi, 1976
- Al-Yusi, Mashrab al-amm wa-al-khass min kalimat al-ikhlas (Silsilat al-Amal al-kamilah lil-Imam al-Hasan al-Yusi fi al-fikr al-Islami)
- Al-Yusi, Fahrasat Al-Yusi, The 'fahrasa' (academic journey) of Al-Yusi Al Hasan, 2004
- Al-Faqih Abu 'Ali al Yusi Al-Mdaghri, a biography of al-Yusi, Abd al Kabir, 1989
- Kenneth L. Honerkamp, "Al-Yusi, Abu al-Hassan b. Masud" in: J. Lowry and D. Stewart (ed.) Dictionary of Literary Biography, vol. Arabic Literary Culture 1350-1830, Detroit: Thomson Gale, 2007
- Jacques Berque, Al-Yousi: Problèmes de la Culture Marocaine au 17e Siècle, Paris, 2001 (reprint of 1958)
- Clifford Geertz, Islam Observed: religious development in Morocco and Indonesia, University of Chicago Press, 1971, ISBN 0-226-28511-1, p. 29 - 35
- H. Munson, Jr., "Geertz on Religion", Religion 16(1986): 19-32
- Abdelfattah Kilito, "Speaking to Princes: Al-Yusi and Mawlay Ismail." In the Shadow of the Sultan, ed. Rahma Bourqia and Susan Gilson Miller. Cambridge, MA: Harvard UP, 1999. pp. 30–46. (Translation of Abdelfattah Kilito, "Parler au prince: Al-Yousi et Mawlay Ismail.")
- Paul Rabinow, Symbolic Domination: Cultural Form and Historical Change in Morocco, University of Chicago Press, 1975
- Ernest Gellner, Muslim Society (chap. 10), Cambridge University Press, 1981.
