= Abu-l-Hasan al-Tamgruti =

Moroccan historian

Personal life
- Born: Abu-l-Hasan Ali ibn Mohammed al-Tamgruti; 1560 Tamegroute, Morocco
- Died: 1594/5
- Resting place: Marrakesh, Morocco
- Notable work: Rihla (travel account of his journey to Istanbul)
- Occupation: Author, Ambassador, Fqih, Official

Religious life
- Religion: Islam
- Denomination: Sunni
- School: Maliki

Abu-l-Hasan Ali ibn Mohammed al-Tamgruti (Arabic: علي بن محمد التمكروتي; born in Tamegroute ca. 1560, died in 1594/5) was a Moroccan author, ambassador, fqih and one of the most important officials of the Saadian court during the reign of Ahmad al-Mansur. He was in charge of the embassy to the Turkish sultan Murad III together with secretary of state Abd al-Aziz al-Fishtali. He is best known because of the rihla of his journey to Istanbul in 1590–91. He was buried in the sanctuary of Qadi Ayyad in Marrakesh.
