= Tamsahelte =

Tamsahelte تمساهلت
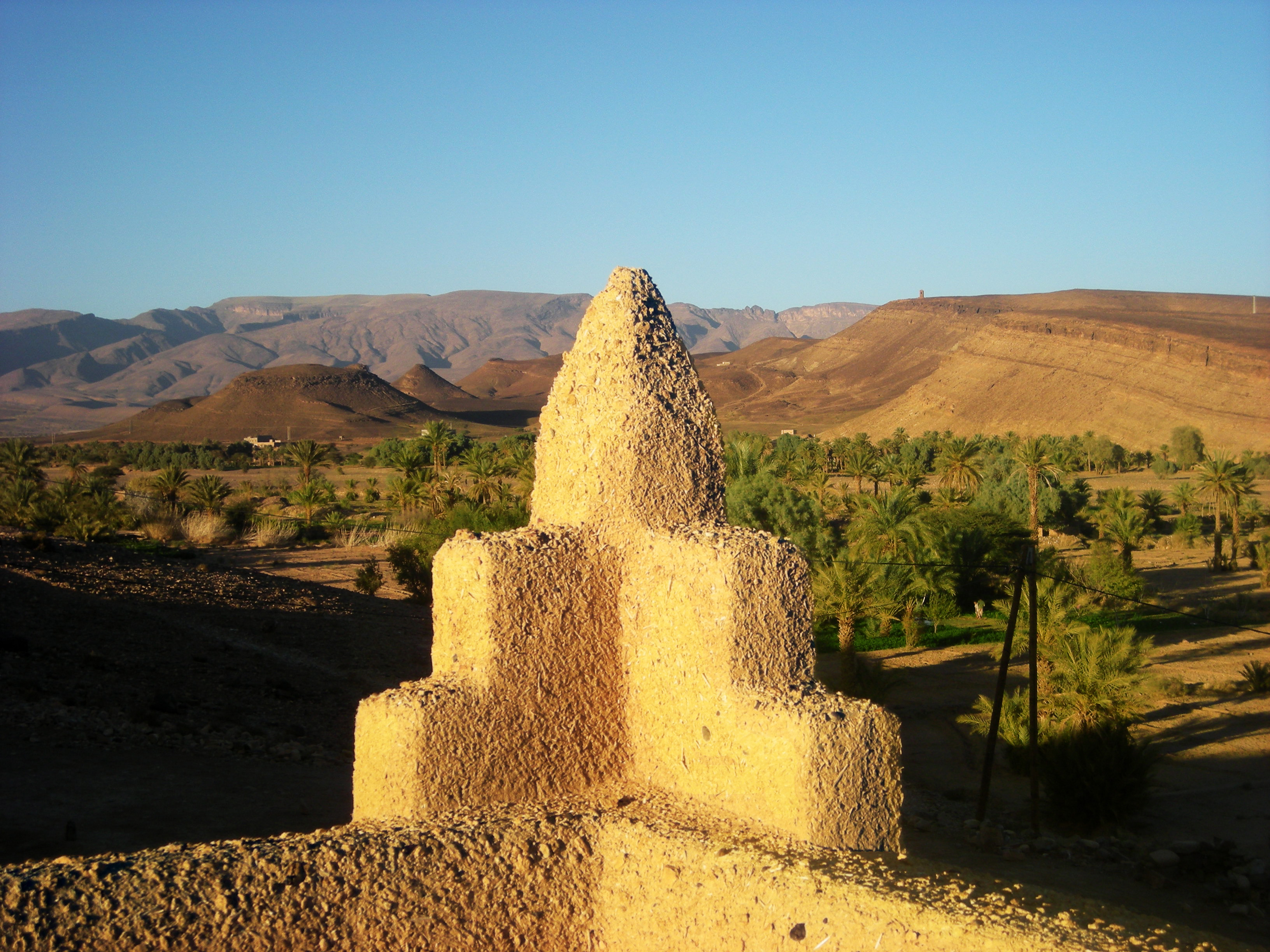

- Location in Morocco
- Coordinates: 30°49′1.5″N 5°39′36″W
- Country: Morocco
- Region: Drâa-Tafilalet
- Province: Zagora Province
- Community: Tazzarine

Government
  - President of the Urban Community of Tazzarine: Mohamed Friks
- Time zone: UTC+0 (GMT)
- Postcode: 47703
- Area code: +212

Tamsahelte (Arabic: تمساهلت) is a small village in the Zagora Province of the Drâa-Tafilalet district in southeastern Morocco, about 10 kilometers northwest of Tazzarine and 20 kilometers east of N'Kob. It is located at around 30°49′1.5″N 5°39′36″W in the heart of the Ait Atta area. The village has about five hundred inhabitants. People live from agriculture. Despite the dry climate, wells produce sufficient water for the residents and for irrigation of the gardens. Tamsahelte and its region are well known for the good quality of the henna plants and dates. The language spoken in this region is Tamazight. The population is mostly elderly people. There is no industry or other means of earning money. Therefore younger people leave the village to look for a job in larger cities. In this way, they can support their parents. The climate is very dry and it is hard to cultivate vegetables and sell them on the markets. To get some water to irrigate the gardens they have to dig deep. It is remarkable that farmers are only allowed to dig up to 40 meters, but in some areas, farmers need to drill to a depth of 250 or 300 meters or even more to find the water they need. Usually, this water is not drinkable.

== Nearby villages ==
- Abdi n'ilmchane
- Ait Ouazik
- N'kob
- Oum raman
- Tanoumrit
- Tazzarine
- Timarighin

== Climate ==
Tamsahelte is considered a desert-like climate, usually sunny and warm. The highest average temperature is in July, at around 32.1 °C. The lowest average temperatures in the year occur in January, at around 10.1 °C.

Climate data for Tamsahelte
Month	Jan	Feb	Mar	Apr	May	Jun	Jul	Aug	Sep	Oct	Nov	Dec	Year
Mean daily maximum °C (°F)	18.1 (64.6)	20.3 (68.5)	23.6 (74.5)	28.1 (82.6)	32.6 (90.7)	38 (100)	42.1 (107.8)	41 (106)	34.2 (93.6)	28.7 (83.7)	22.8 (73.0)	18.4 (65.1)	29.0 (84.2)
Mean daily minimum °C (°F)	2.2 (36.0)	4.3 (39.7)	7.6 (45.7)	10.8 (51.4)	14.4 (57.9)	18.8 (65.8)	22.2 (72.0)	22.3 (72.1)	17.3 (63.1)	13.1 (55.6)	8.4 (47.1)	3.8 (38.8)	12.1 (53.8)
Average precipitation mm (inches)	5 (0.2)	4 (0.2)	6 (0.2)	3 (0.1)	4 (0.2)	1 (0.0)	1 (0.0)	4 (0.2)	9 (0.4)	17 (0.7)	18 (0.7)	9 (0.4)	81 (3.3)
Source: Climate Data

== See also ==
- List of municipalities, communes, and arrondissements of Morocco
