= Ait Ouallal, Zagora =

Ait Ouallal Ait Ouzzine / ⴰⵢⵜ ⵡⴰⵍⵍⴰⵍ آيت ولال
- Ait Ouallal
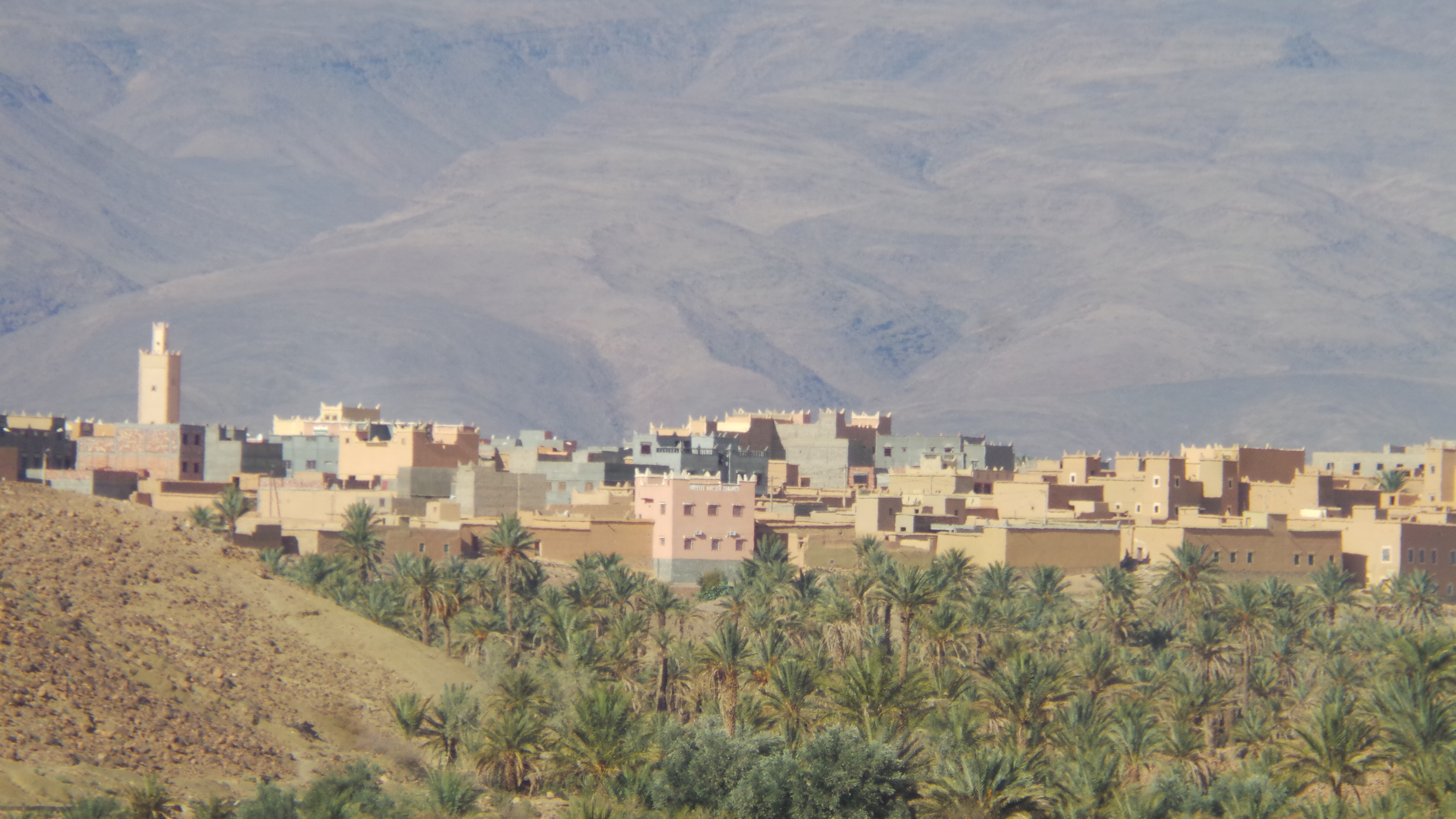
- Oasis of palm trees in N'Kob, near the village of Ait Ouallal

- Location in Morocco
- Coordinates: 30°51′51.858″N 5°53′20.412″W
- Country: Morocco
- Region: Drâa-Tafilalet
- Province: Zagora Province
- Community: Ait Ouallal

Government
  - President of the Urban Community of Ait Ouallal: Ahmed Ait Baha

Population (2004)
  - Total: 9,649
- Time zone: UTC+0 (GMT)
- Postal code: 47723
- Area code: +212
- Geocode: 587.03.07.

Ait Ouallal (Berber languages: ⴰⵢⵜ ⵡⴰⵍⵍⴰⵍ, Arabic: آيت ولال, also known as Ait Ouzzine and Ajmou Amajgal) is a rural municipality in the Zagora Province, in the region of Draa Tafilalet, Morocco. It is located at approximately 30°51′51.858″N 5°53′20.412″W, near the village of N'Kob (3,1 km) and 27 kilometers from Tamsahelte (30°49′1.5″N 5°39′36″W) via R108. Based on the 2004 census, Ait Ouallal has 9649 inhabitants.

== Neighboring municipalities ==
- 1. N'kob
- 2. Tazzarine

== Local institutions ==
The weekly open-air market, known as a "souk," takes place every Saturday in the neighboring town of Nkotb, located at a distance of approximately 1 kilometer.

== Climate ==
Ait Ouallal, Zagora has a desert climate (Köppen climate classification BWh).

Climate data for Ait Ouallal
Month	Jan	Feb	Mar	Apr	May	Jun	Jul	Aug	Sep	Oct	Nov	Dec	Year
Mean daily maximum °C (°F)	17.6 (63.7)	19.4 (66.9)	22.8 (73.0)	27.2 (81.0)	31.6 (88.9)	37 (99)	41.2 (106.2)	40 (104)	33.6 (92.5)	27.8 (82.0)	21.8 (71.2)	17.6 (63.7)	28.1 (82.7)
Mean daily minimum °C (°F)	1.4 (34.5)	3.3 (37.9)	6.6 (43.9)	9.7 (49.5)	13.2 (55.8)	17.5 (63.5)	21 (70)	21.2 (70.2)	16.5 (61.7)	12.1 (53.8)	7.3 (45.1)	2.9 (37.2)	11.1 (51.9)
Average precipitation mm (inches)	6 (0.2)	5 (0.2)	8 (0.3)	4 (0.2)	5 (0.2)	1 (0.0)	1 (0.0)	4 (0.2)	10 (0.4)	19 (0.7)	20 (0.8)	10 (0.4)	93 (3.6)
Source: Climate Data

== See also ==
- List of municipalities, communes, and arrondissements of Morocco
