= Ahmad ibn Khalid an-Nasiri =

Moroccan writer and historian

- أحمد بن خالد الناصري
- Born: 20 April 1835; Salé, Morocco
- Died: 13 October 1897 (aged 62); Salé, Morocco
- Occupations: Historian, Scholar

Academic work
- Era: 19th century
- Main interests: Moroccan history, Islamic west history
- Notable works: Kitab al-Istiqsa li-Akhbar duwal al-Maghrib al-Aqsa
- Arabic name
- Personal (Ism): Aḥmad
- Patronymic (Nasab): ibn Khālid ibn Ḥammād
- Teknonymic (Kunya): Abu ’lʿAbbās
- Epithet (Laqab): Shihāb al-Dīn
- Toponymic (Nisba): al-Nāṣirī al-Salāwī

Abu al-ʿAbbās Aḥmad ibn Khālid al-Nāṣirī al-Slāwī, (Arabic: أبو العباس أحمد بن خالد الناصري السلاوي; 1835–1897) was a Moroccan historian considered to be the greatest of the 19th century. He was a prominent scholar and a member of the family that founded the Nasiriyya Sufi order in the 17th century. He wrote an important multivolume history of Morocco: Kitab al-Istiqsa li-Akhbar duwal al-Maghrib al-Aqsa. The work is a general history of Morocco and the Islamic west from the Islamic conquest to the end of the 19th century. He died in 1897 shortly after putting the finishing touches to his chronicle.

He was born in Salé in 20 April or 22 March 1835. He descended from the Arab tribe of Maqil.
