= Bni Zoli =

Rural commune in Morocco

Coordinates: 30°29′02″N 5°51′43″W

Bni Zoli is a settlement (rural commune) in Zagora Province, Drâa-Tafilalet region, Morocco. It has a population of 18,400.
