= Tazzarine =

Tazzarine تازارين ⵜⴰⵣⴰⵔⵉⵏ
- Town
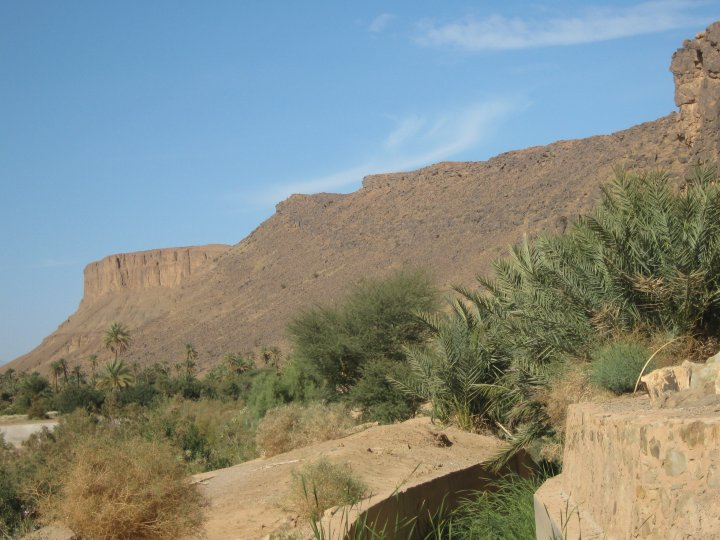
- Interactive map of Tazzarine
- Coordinates: 30°46′20″N 5°32′45″W
- Country: Morocco
- Region: Drâa-Tafilalet
- Province: Zagora Province
- Community: Tazzarine

Government
  - President of the Urban Community of Tazzarine: Mohamed Friks

Population (2004)
  - Total: 13,721
- Time zone: UTC+0 (GMT)
- Postal code: 47703

Tazzarine (Arabic: تازارين, Standard Moroccan Tamazight: ⵜⴰⵣⴰⵔⵉⵏ, also spelled as Tazarine) is a small city and rural commune in Zagora Province, Morocco. It is located at around 30°46′20″N 5°32′45″W in the area of the Jbel Saghro. The commune includes the small villages of Tamsahelte, Timarighin and Oum raman. The neighboring municipalities are N'kob in the northwest, Taghbalt and Ait Boudaoud.

The town has about five marabout tombs. All these graves are for spiritual leadership. Nearby to Tazzarine is the petroglyphs site of Ait Ouazik. These rock carvings date from approximately 5000 BC.

According to the 2004 population estimation, the town has a population of about 13,721 people.

It features prominently in the 2006 film Babel.

== Economy ==
Tazzarine's economy depends on agriculture, tourism and trade. In addition, many families live on the money sent by relatives working in Europe. The weekly open-air market (souk) is held Wednesday in the city center.

== Features ==
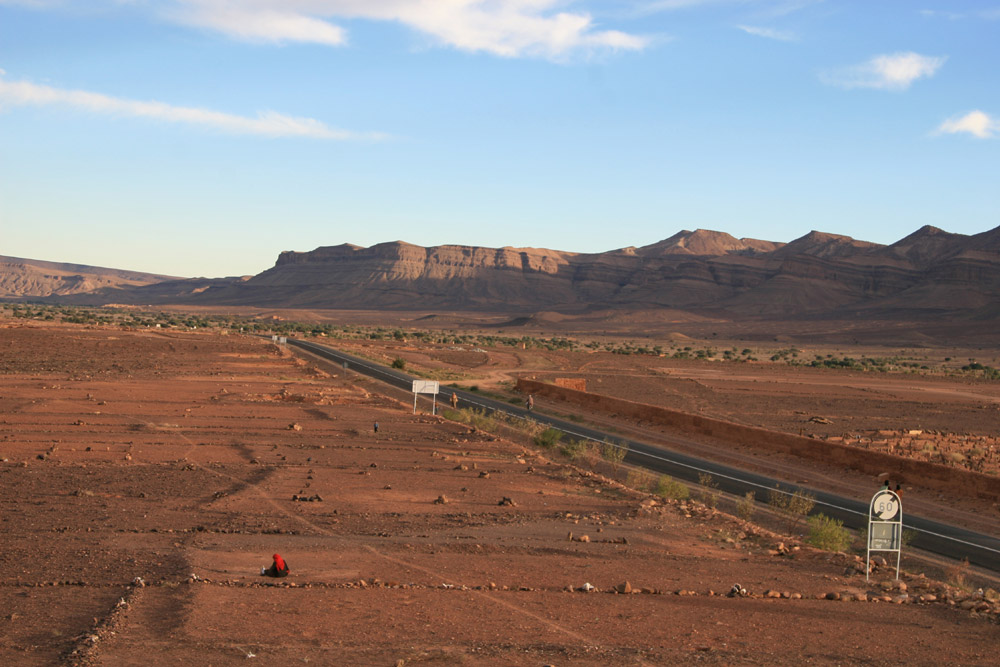
Way out of N'kob, direction Tazzarine in south Morocco

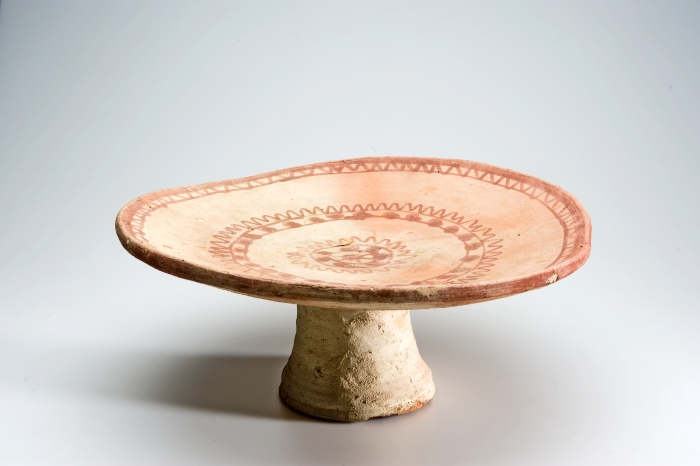
A Couscous plate from Tazzarine.

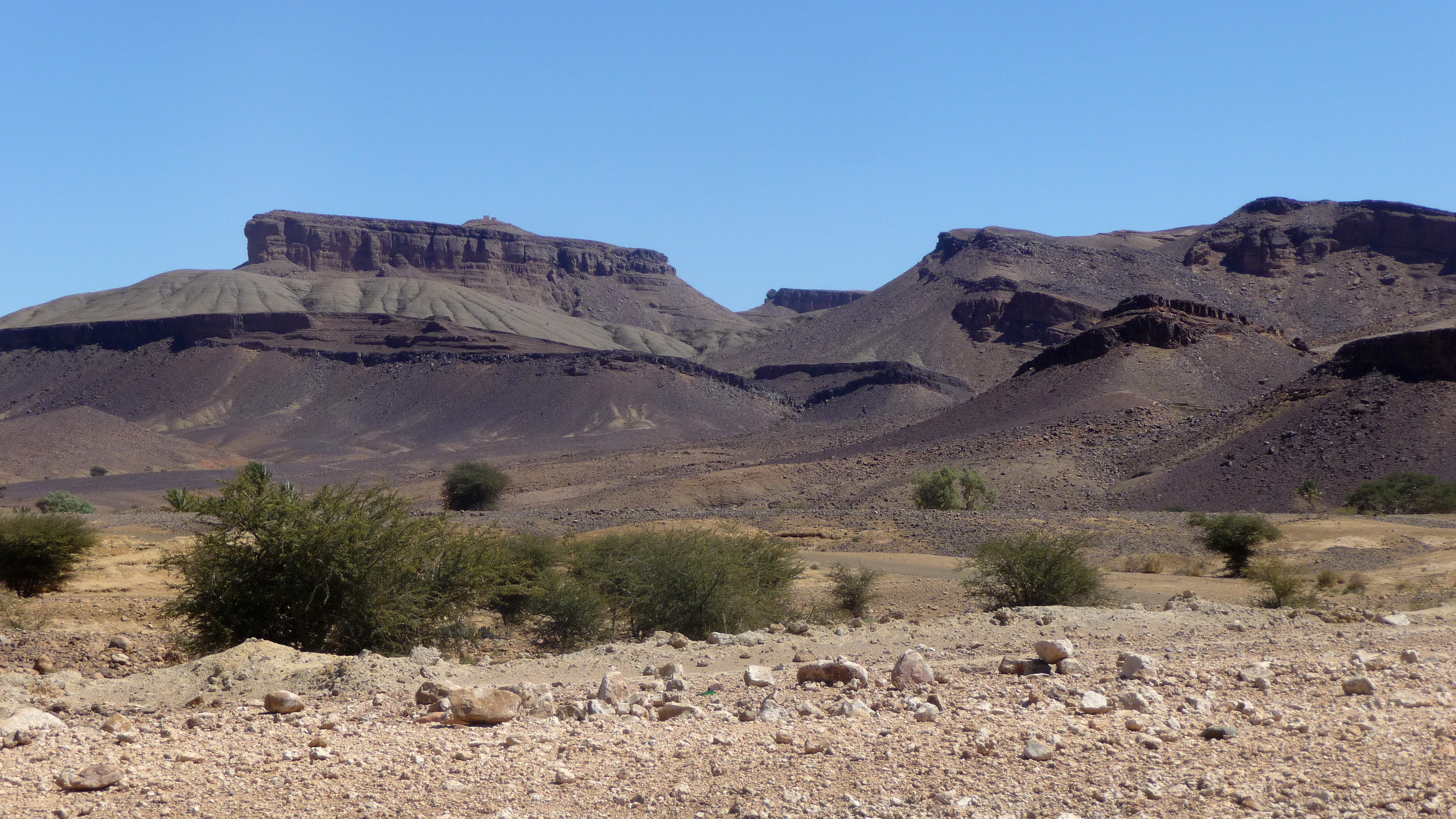
Mountains in the regions of Tazzarine.

== Neighboring municipalities ==
- 1. Ait Boudaoud
- 2. Taghbalte
- 3. N'kob
- 4. Ait Ouallal ( Ait Ouzzine)
