= Ahmed ibn Nasir =

Moroccan writer

Ahmed ibn Nasir al-Dar'i
- Born: 1647; Tamegroute, Morocco
- Died: 1717 (aged 69–70)
- Occupations: Historian, Sufi writer, Head of Nasiriyya brotherhood

Academic work
- Era: 17th-18th century
- Main interests: Sufism, Travel literature
- Notable works: Rihla

Ahmed ibn Nasir al-Dar'i (Arabic: احمد بن ناصر الدرعي) (sometimes spelled Bennacer) (1647–1717) was a Moroccan Sufi writer and head of the zawiya of the Nasiriyya brotherhood at Tamegroute, son of its founder Mohammed ibn Nasir. He made six pilgrimages to Mecca, travelling to Ethiopia, Arabia, Egypt, Iraq and Persia. During his travels he established new branches of the Sufi brotherhood. He wrote a series of memoirs of his journeys called the Rihla (partly translated by A. Berbrugger in 1846). He brought back numerous books from all parts of the Islamic world, which formed the basis of the library at Tamegroute. His translated works can be found saved in the Library of Congress in the United States
