= Al-Istiqsa =

كتاب الاستقصا لأخبار دول المغرب الأقصى Kitab al-Istiqsa li-Akhbar duwal al-Maghrib al-Aqsa
- Author: Ahmad ibn Khalid al-Nasiri
- Language: Arabic
- Publication place: Morocco

Al-Istiqsa (Arabic: الاستقصا) or Kitab al-Istiqsa li-Akhbar duwal al-Maghrib al-Aqsa (كتاب الاستقصا لأخبار دول المغرب الأقصى) is a multivolume history of Morocco by Ahmad ibn Khalid an-Nasiri first published in Cairo in 1894. It was the first comprehensive national history of Morocco, covering the history of al-Maghrib al-Aqsa (Morocco) from the Muslim conquest of the Maghreb to the reign of Abdelaziz of Morocco in 1894.

The book was pioneering in using non-Muslim sources, annotating and contextualizing citations, and using exact quotations.

The Scottish orientalist H. A. R. Gibb described an-Nasiri's work as the "last worthy representative" of tarikh, or the old Arabic historiographical tradition, while the French orientalist Évariste Lévi-Provençal considered it a novel work on three accounts: that it was read by a local and foreign audience—Muslims and non-Muslims alike, that it is a general history and not restricted to a specific dynasty or city, and that it was the first Moroccan historical work to cite non-Muslim European sources.
