= Nasiriyya =

Nasiriyya Order
- Moroccan Arabic: Al-Zawiya Nasiriyya
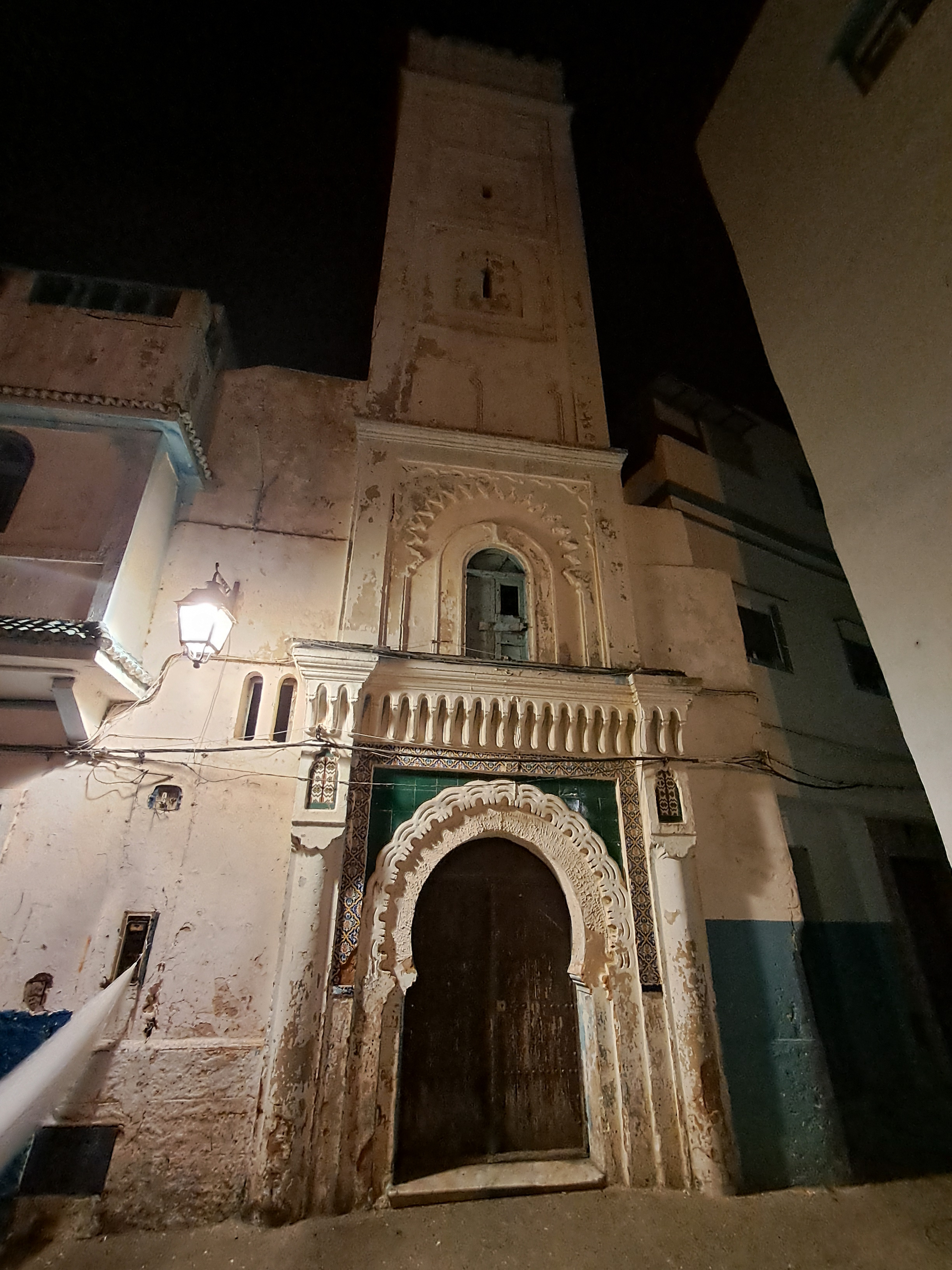
- Entrance to a Nasiriyya Zawiya in Larache, Morocco
- Abbreviation: Nasiriyya
- Formation: 1642; 384 years ago
- Founder: Sidi Nasir ibn Drawi
- Founded at: Tamegroute, Morocco

The Nasiriyya (Arabic: الزاوية الناصرية) is a Sufi order founded by Sidi Mohammed ibn Nasir al-Drawi (1603–1674) whose centre was Tamegroute.

== History ==
The Nasiriyya order took its name from founder Sidi Muhammad bin Nasir al-Drawi (1603–1674), who took over teaching at the Tamegroute zawiya in the 1640s.

Ahmed ibn Nasir who was the son of its founder Mohammed ibn Nasir, made six pilgrimages to Mecca, travelling to Ethiopia, Arabia, Egypt, Iraq and Persia. During his travels he established new branches of the Sufi brotherhood. He wrote a series of memoirs of his journeys called the Rihlat Sayyid Al-ṭarīqah. He brought back numerous books from all parts of the Islamic world, which formed the basis of the library at Tamegroute. His translated works can be found saved in the Library of Congress in the United States

The 19th sheikh Abu Bekr is well-known, in the Draa valley (zawiya in Mhamid Ghuslan) and in the west through his encounters with the travelers Gerhard Rohlfs and Charles de Foucauld. In order to view the books at the library, a permit must be obtained from the Moroccan government, which allows you to handle the books inside the library only. The books collected by Ali Ben include texts on medicine, Qu'ranic learning and astrology, as well as mathematics and the sciences.

== Notable alumni ==
- Ahmad ibn Khalid an-Nasiri was born in Salé, Morocco and is considered to be the greatest Moroccan historian of the 19th century. He was a prominent scholar and a member of the family that founded the Nasiriyya Sufi order in the 17th century. He wrote an important multivolume history of Morocco: Kitab al-Istiqsa li-Akhbar duwal al-Maghrib al-Aqsa. The work is a general history of Morocco and the Islamic west from the Islamic conquest to the end of the 19th century. He died in 1897 shortly after having put the finishing touches to his chronicle.

== See also ==
- Darqawa (Sufism)
