= Tamegroute =

Tamegroute ⵜⴰⵎⴳⵔⵓⵜ تامكروت
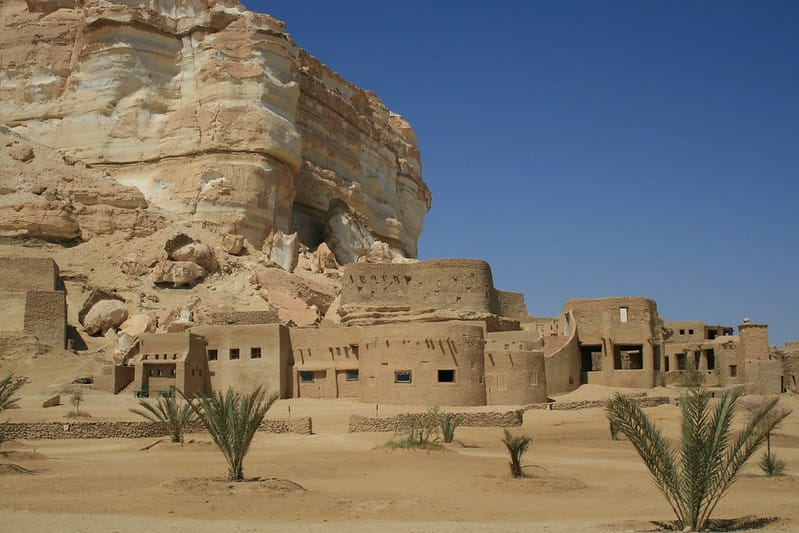
- Traditional earthen buildings of Tamegroute
- Interactive map of Tamegroute
- Coordinates: 30°16′N 5°40′W
- Country: Morocco
- Region: Drâa-Tafilalet
- Province: Zagora

Population (2014)
  - Total: 21,603
- Time zone: UTC+0 (GMT)

Tamegroute (Note: Tamazigh: Berber languages: ⵜⴰⵎⴳⵔⵓⵜ; Darija: Moroccan Arabic: تامكروت; romanized: Tamgrout) is a village near Zagora in the Draa River valley in the foothills of the Moroccan pre-Sahara. In Tamazigh languages, the name literally translates to "Final Place Before the Desert."

It historically served as a hub of learning, libraries, and religion through its famous Sufi zawiya, the historical center of the Nasiriyya order, one of the most influential Sufi orders in the Islamic world. Tamegroute's glazed ceramics are also very well known.

== Climate ==
Climate data for Tamegroute
Month	Jan	Feb	Mar	Apr	May	Jun	Jul	Aug	Sep	Oct	Nov	Dec	Year
Mean daily maximum °C (°F)	20.4 (68.7)	22.7 (72.9)	26.1 (79.0)	30.9 (87.6)	35.6 (96.1)	41.0 (105.8)	45.1 (113.2)	43.8 (110.8)	36.8 (98.2)	31.1 (88.0)	25.2 (77.4)	20.5 (68.9)	31.6 (88.9)
Mean daily minimum °C (°F)	4.1 (39.4)	6.2 (43.2)	9.8 (49.6)	13.3 (55.9)	17.4 (63.3)	21.7 (71.1)	25.4 (77.7)	25.4 (77.7)	20.1 (68.2)	15.3 (59.5)	10.7 (51.3)	5.6 (42.1)	14.6 (58.3)
Average precipitation mm (inches)	3 (0.1)	3 (0.1)	4 (0.2)	1 (0.0)	1 (0.0)	0 (0)	1 (0.0)	3 (0.1)	5 (0.2)	11 (0.4)	13 (0.5)	6 (0.2)	51 (2.0)
Source: Climate-data.org

== History ==
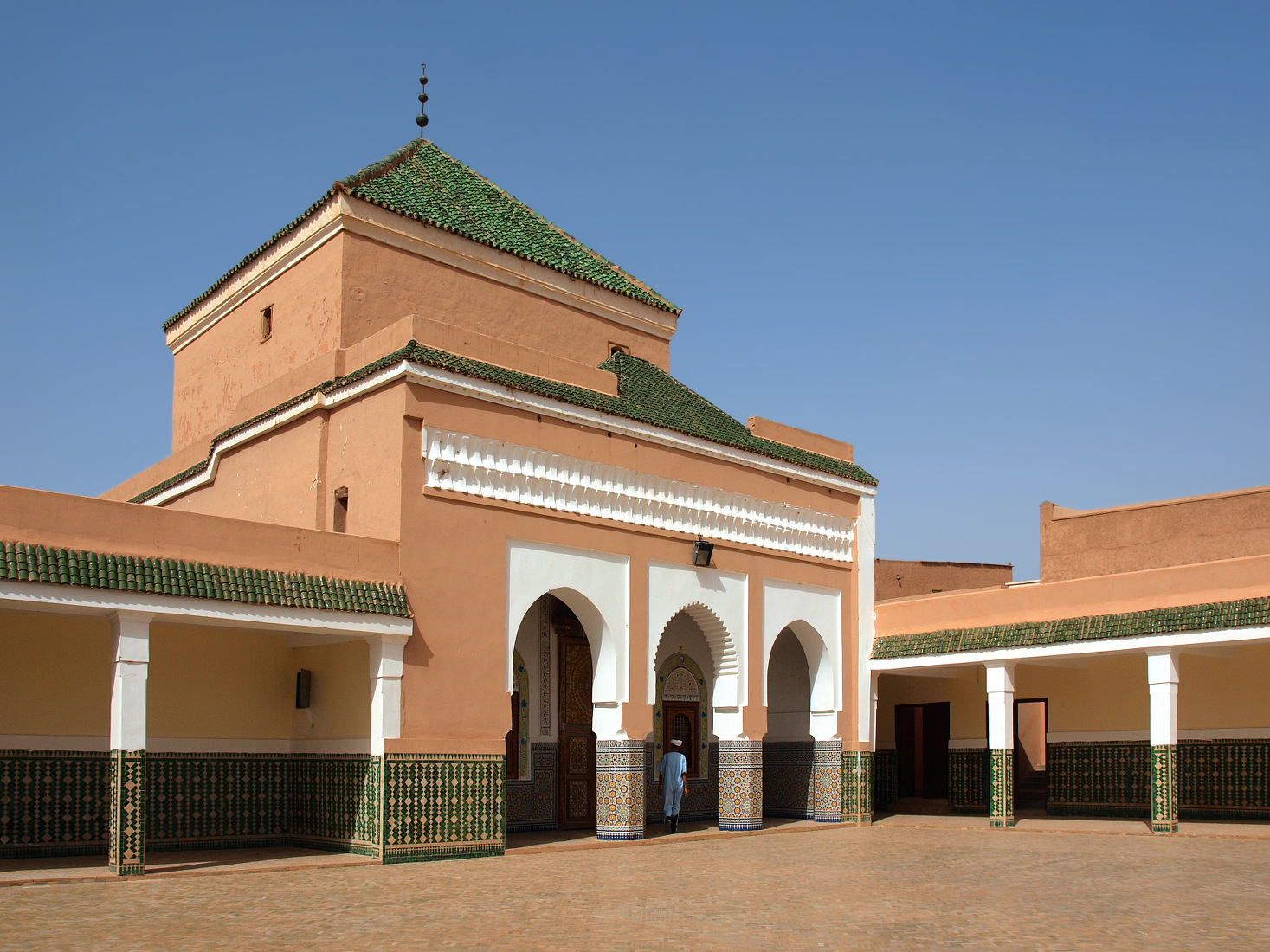
Zaouia Naciria, Tamegroute

Tamegroute has been a religious center since the 11th century. It had a religious school made famous by Abu Hafs Umar b. Ahmed al Ansari in 1575–76. The Nasiriyya order took its name from founder Sidi Muhammad bin Nasir al-Drawi (1603–1674), who took over teaching at the Tamegroute zawiya in the 1640s.

Ahmed ibn Nasir who was the son of its founder Mohammed ibn Nasir, made six pilgrimages to Mecca, travelling to Ethiopia, Arabia, Egypt, Iraq and Persia. During his travels he established new branches of the Sufi brotherhood. He wrote a series of memoirs of his journeys called the Rihlat Sayyid Al-ṭarīqah. He brought back numerous books from all parts of the Islamic world, which formed the basis of the library at Tamegroute. His translated works can be found saved in the Library of Congress in the United States

The 19th sheikh Abu Bekr is well-known, in the Draa valley (zawiya in Mhamid Ghuslan) and in the west through his encounters with the travelers Gerhard Rohlfs and Charles de Foucauld. In order to view the books at the library, a permit must be obtained from the Moroccan government, which allows you to handle the books inside the library only. The books collected by Ali Ben include texts on medicine, Qu'ranic learning and astrology, as well as mathematics and the sciences.

== Moussem ==
A month after the greatest Islam holy day of Aid el-Kebir, Tamegroute hosts the yearly Moussem (festival) honoring Sidi Muhammad bin Nasir.

== Pottery ==
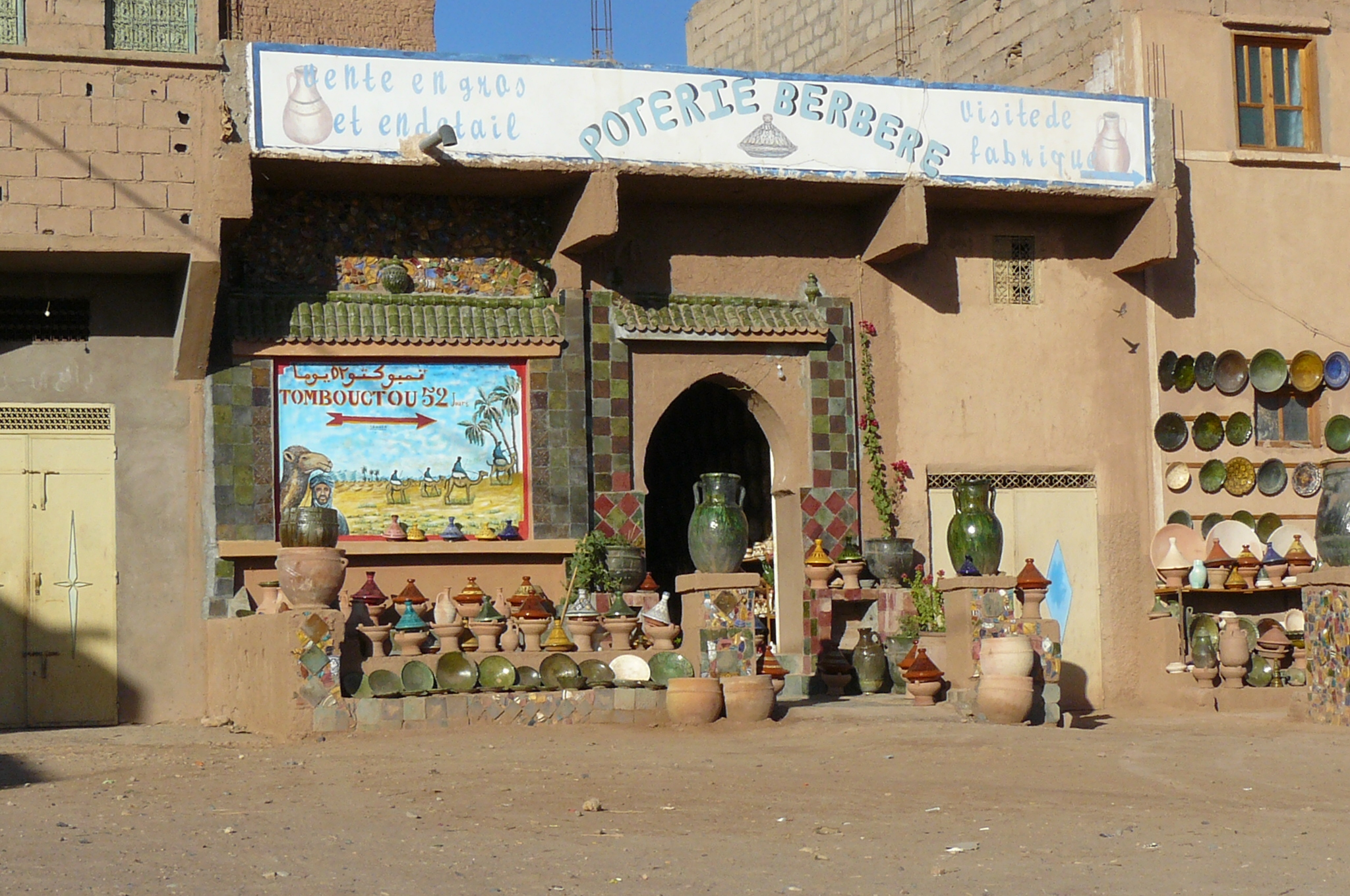
Pottery in Tamegroute

The outdoor weekly market (souk) is held on Saturdays in the city center, where people can admire all kinds of pottery.

== Abu-l-Hasan Ali Ibn Mohammed al-Tamgruti ==
Tamegroute was the place of birth of one of the most important officials of the Saadian court, the author and ambassador Abu-l-Hasan Ali Ibn Mohammed al-Tamgruti, best known because of the rihla of his journey to Istanbul in 1590–91 for Ahmad al-Mansur.

== Bibliography and external links ==
- Ph.D. Thesis: "Between God and men : the Nasiriyya and economic life in Morocco, 1640–1830" by David Gutelius. Johns Hopkins University, 2001.
- The Nasiriyya - Abstract from David Gutelius' dissertation, "Market Growth and Social Change in the Western Maghrib, 1640-1830."
- Article: The path is easy and the benefits large: The Nasiriyya, social networks and economic change in Morocco, 1640–1830, from: The Journal of African History, Gutelius, David P.V., 01-Jan-02
- Book chapter: "Sufi networks and the Social Contexts for Scholarship in Morocco and the Northern Sahara, 1660-1830" by David Gutelius. In "The Transmission of Learning in Islamic Africa ed. Scott Reese. Leiden: Brill Academic Press, 2004.
- Agriculture, Sufism and the State in Tenth/Sixteenth-Century Morocco, by Francisco Rodriguez-Manas, Bulletin of the School of Oriental and African Studies, University of London, Vol. 59, No. 3 (1996), pp. 450–471
- The Nasiri supplication
- Example of a manuscript (from Timbouctou) in the library of the Nasiryya
- Dalil Makhtutat Dar al Kutub al Nasiriya, 1985 (Catalog of the Nasiri zawiya in Tamagrut), (ed. Keta books)

See also: Darqawa and Nasiriyya (Sufism) "the 19th century was the Darqawi century, just as the 18th century had been the Nasiri century"
