= Saghro =

Mountain range in Morocco

Adrar n Saghro

Highest point
- Peak: Amalou n'Mansour
- Elevation: 2,712 m (8,898 ft)
- Prominence: 1,167 m (3,829 ft)
- Listing: Ribu
- Coordinates: 31°9′0″N 5°39′0″W

Dimensions
- Length: 320 km (200 mi) ENE/WSW
- Width: 110 km (68 mi) NNW/SSE

Naming
- Native name: ⴰⴷⵔⴰⵔ ⵏ ⵚⴰⵖⵔⵓ (Standard Moroccan Tamazight)

Geography
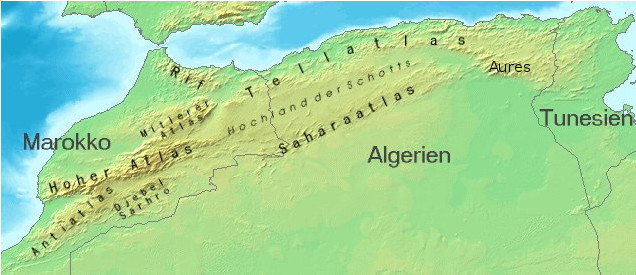
- Location of the Jbel Saghro in the Maghreb area
- Location: Morocco
- Parent range: Anti-Atlas

Saghro (Standard Moroccan Tamazight: ⴰⴷⵔⴰⵔ ⵏ ⵚⴰⵖⵔⵓ, romanized: Adrar n Saghro, Moroccan Arabic: جبل صغرو, romanized: Jbel Saghro), is a mountain range in south- east Morocco. It is located south of the High Atlas and east of the Anti-Atlas, extending from the south of Ouarzazate all the way to Tinejdad.

== Geography ==
The Jbel Saghro is an eastern prolongation of the Anti-Atlas, separated from it by the valley of the Draâ. To the north of the range runs the valley of the Dadès, separating it from the massive High Atlas Range.

Saɣru in the Tamazight language means drought, an apt name considering that the Jbel Saghro is the driest mountain area of the whole Atlas Mountain System. Since it is located in the inland side of the greater range this massif does not benefit from the Atlantic Ocean winds that bring humidity to the Anti-Atlas ranges further to the west as well as other ocean-facing ranges further north. Annual rainfall is only 100 mm in the southern slopes and 300 mm at the summits. However, the desolation of the harsh landscapes of the massive dry mountains with the many areas of bare rock and the austere, lunar beauty does not leave anyone unimpressed. Therefore these mountain area is popular with trekkers and adventure-tourists.

The range's high point is the 2712m Amalou n'Mansour, located southeast of Iknioun; other notable peaks are 2,592 m high Jbel Kouaouch, Jbel Afougal (2,196 m) and Jbel Amlal (2,447 m). One of the most important mountain passes of the range is the 2,283 m high Tizi n'Tazazert. Jbel Saghro is a traditional home of the Aït Atta Berber tribe. It is sparsely inhabited, the only notable village in the massif being Iknioun, near Amalou n'Mansour. It is linked by asphalt roads to Boumalne Dades and Tinerhir on the N10 highway, and Nkob to the south. Prehistoric rock engravings can be found in parts of the range.

== Nomads ==
The Jbel Saghro area is home to nomad families who spend their winters in the region. They are semi-nomadic and migrate to Ait Bougemez (Paradise Valley) in the summer with their flocks of sheep and goats, using camels, mules and donkeys to transport their belongings. Their numbers are dwindling as they move to more permanent bases to find a less difficult life and ensure that their children are educated.

The villages, few in number, consist of a few small houses surrounded by a cluster of palm or almond trees. The nomads of the Ait Atta tribe graze their flocks of goats and sheep there while awaiting the transhumance to the High Atlas.

== Features ==
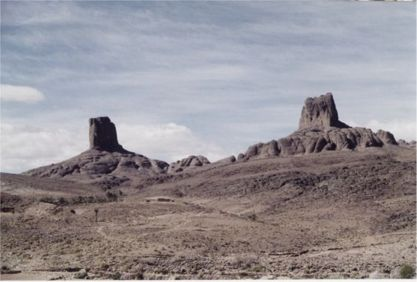
Landscape of the Bab n'Ali in the Jbel Saghro

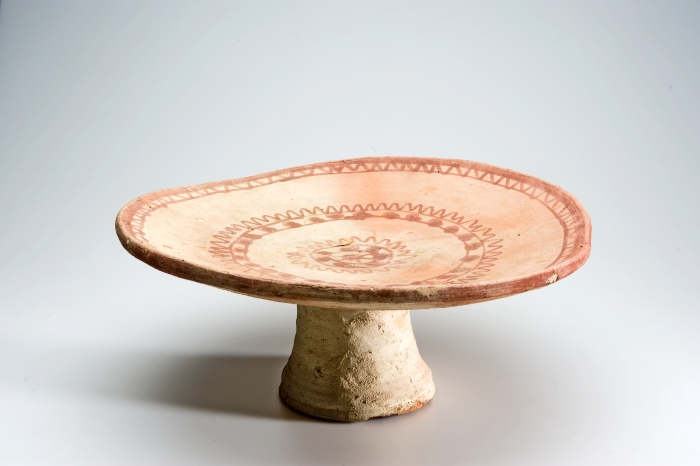
A Couscous plate from Tazzarine.

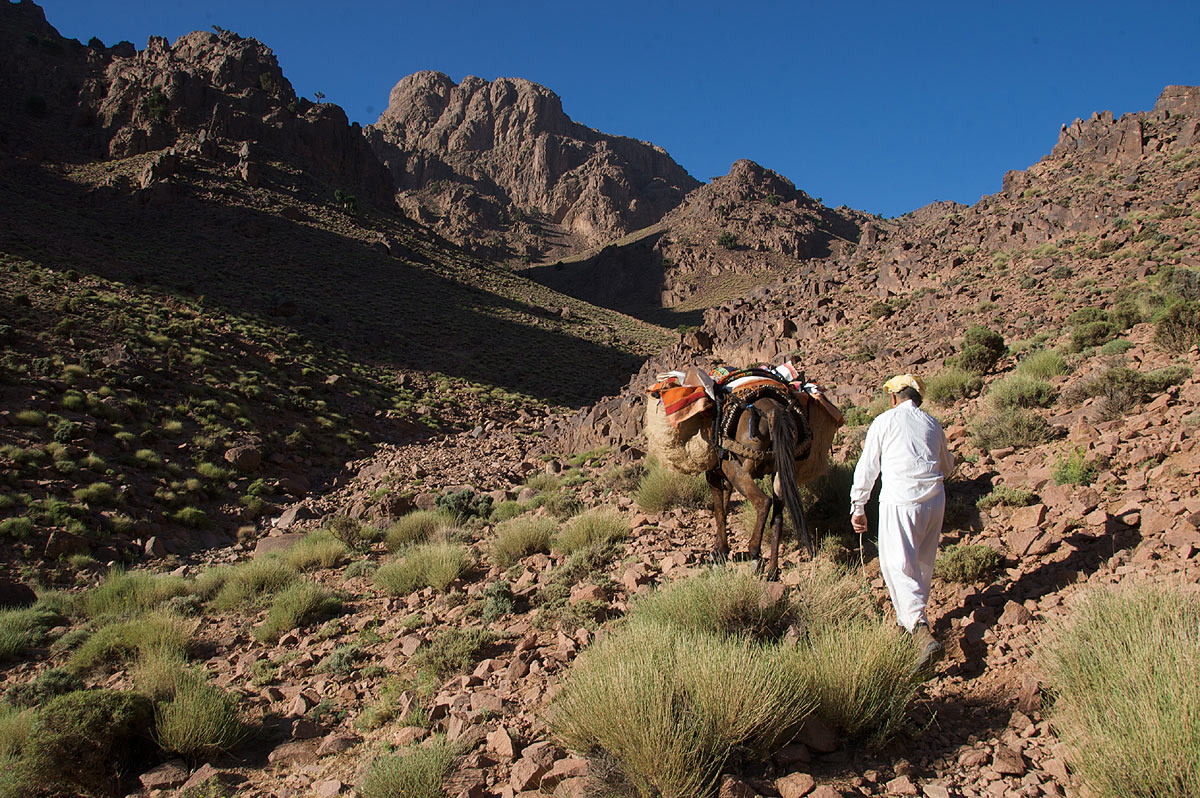
Mountain trekking in the Jbel Saghro.

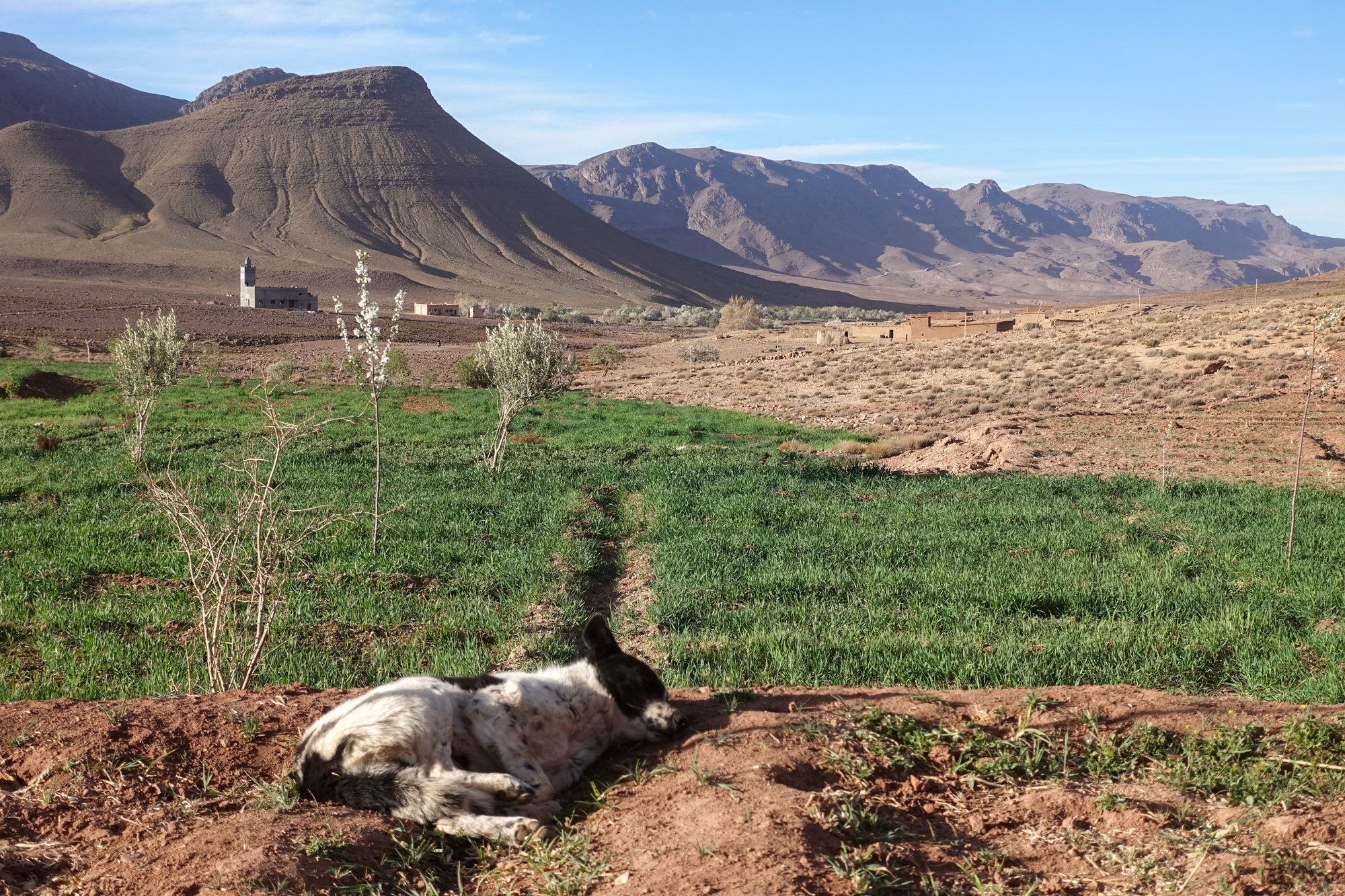
Landscape near Tagmout

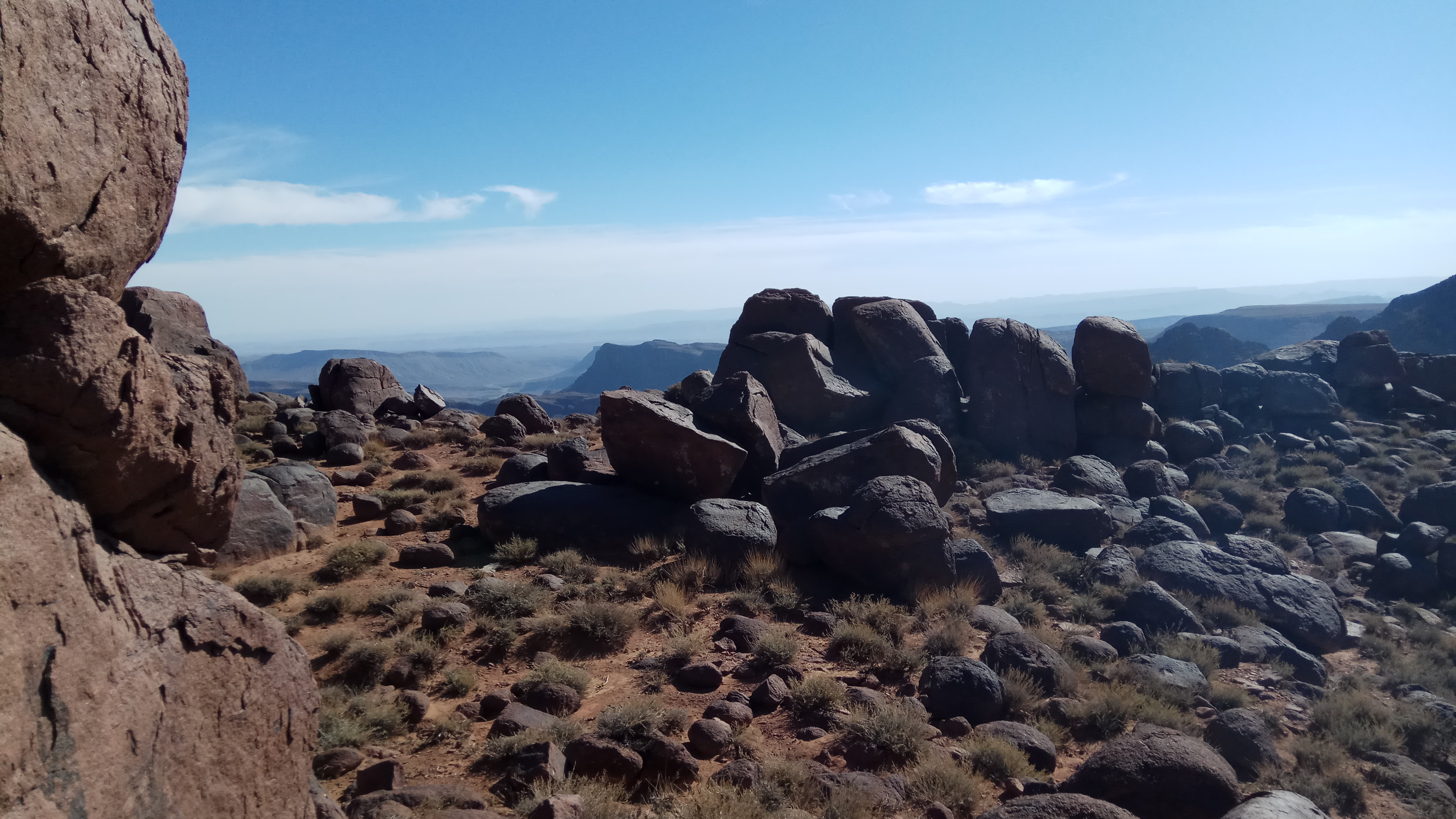
Saghro Summit

== See also ==
- Anti-Atlas
- Dadès Gorges
- Geography of Morocco
