= Zagora Province =

Province of Morocco

Coordinates: 30°19′N 5°50′W

Zagora Province إقليم زاكورة ⵜⴰⵙⴳⴰ ⵏ ⵜⵣⴰⴳⵓⵔⵜ
- Province
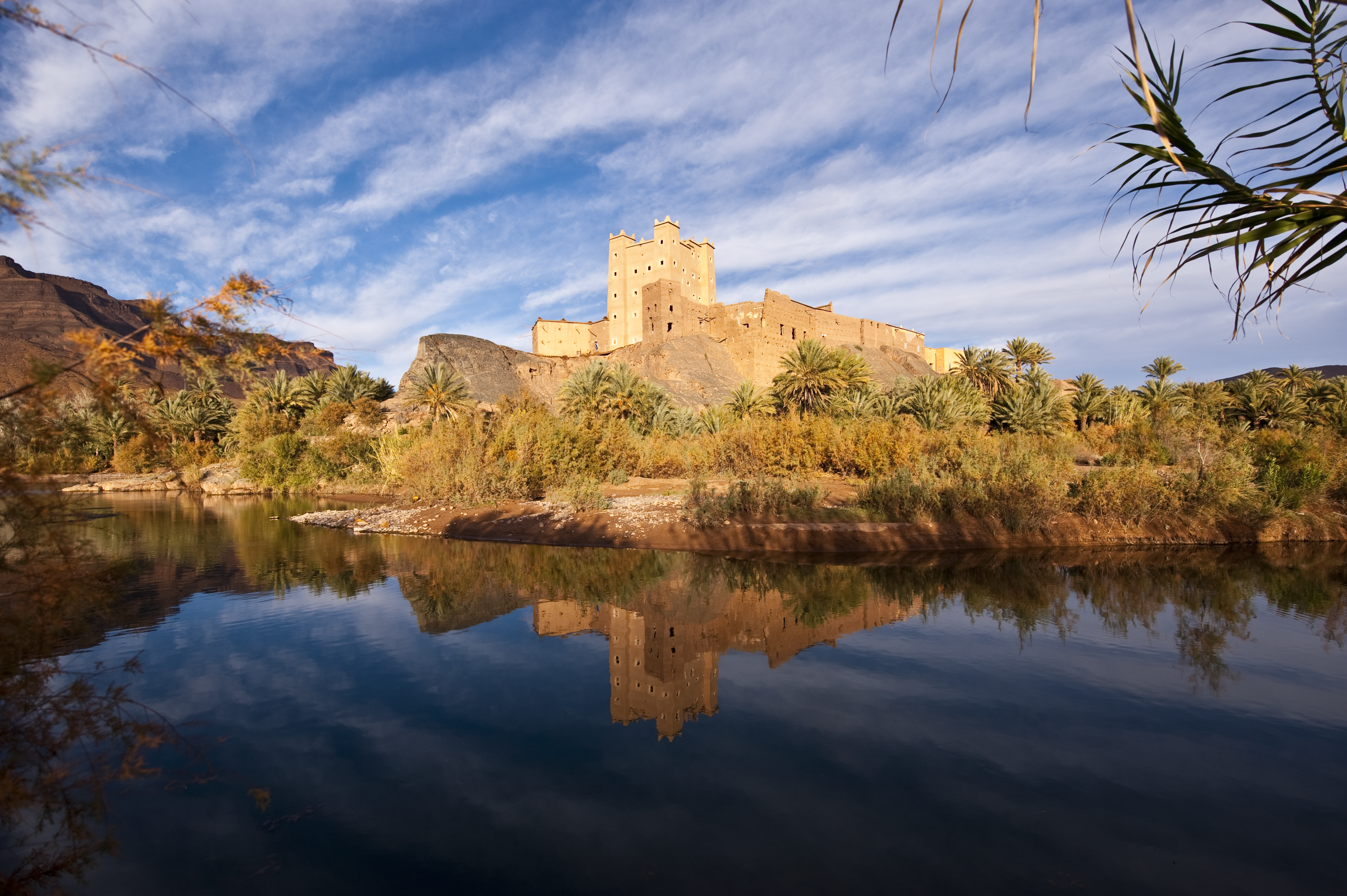
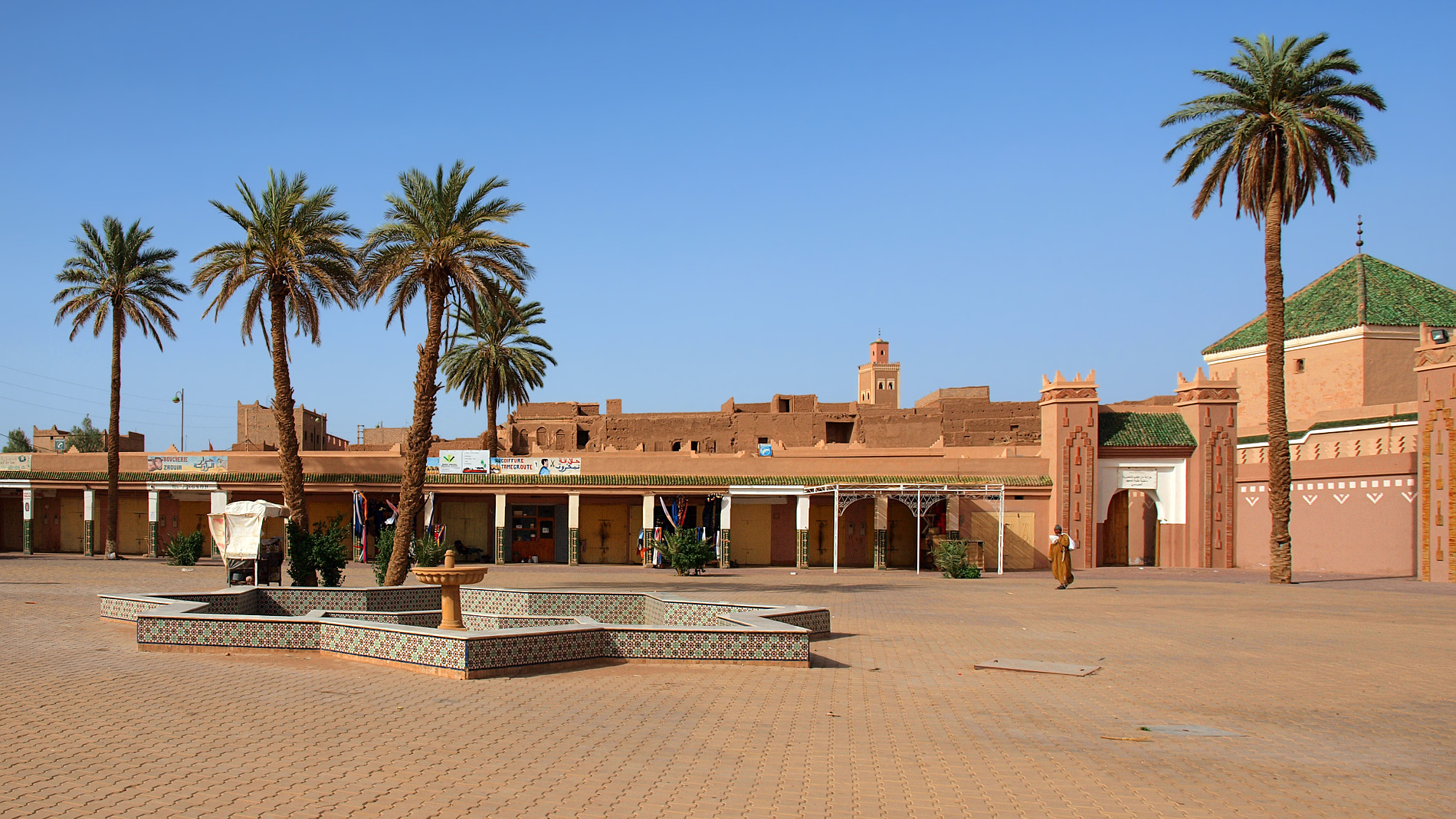
- Kasbah Aït Hammou ou Saïd, located in Tamnougalt, near Agdz Zaouia Naciria in Tamegroute
- Interactive map of Zagora Province
- Country: Morocco
- Region: Drâa-Tafilalet
- Seat: Zagora

Population (2024)
  - Total: 285,545

Zagora (Arabic: زاكورة, Standard Moroccan Tamazight: ⵜⵣⴰⴳⵓⵔⵜ) is a province in the Moroccan region of Drâa-Tafilalet. Its population in 2024 was 285,545.

The major cities are:

- Agdz
- Zagora

== Subdivisions ==
The province is divided administratively into the following:

Name	Geographic code	Type	Households	Population (2004)	Foreign population	Moroccan population	Notes
Agdz	587.01.01.	Municipality	1239	7951	6	7945	
Zagora	587.01.13.	Municipality	4993	34851	17	34834	
Afella N'Dra	587.03.01.	Rural commune	850	7170	0	7170	
Afra	587.03.03.	Rural commune	1074	8317	0	8317	
Ait Boudaoud	587.03.05.	Rural commune	622	5293	0	5293	
Ait Ouallal	587.03.07.	Rural commune	1065	9649	1	9648	
Mezguita	587.03.21.	Rural commune	872	8234	0	8234	
N'Kob	587.03.25.	Rural commune	969	6782	0	6782	
Oulad Yahia Lagraire	587.03.27.	Rural commune	1044	10621	0	10621	
Taghbalte	587.03.31.	Rural commune	939	8867	0	8867	
Tamezmoute	587.03.37.	Rural commune	1216	10462	0	10462	
Tansifte	587.03.39.	Rural commune	1583	12110	1	12109	
Tazzarine	587.03.41.	Rural commune	1713	13721	0	13721	
Bleida	587.09.09.	Rural commune	483	4640	0	4640	
Bni Zoli	587.09.11.	Rural commune	1779	18399	1	18398	
Bouzeroual	587.09.13.	Rural commune	1054	10060	1	10059	
Errouha	587.09.15.	Rural commune	964	9492	0	9492	
Fezouata	587.09.17.	Rural commune	839	8281	0	8281	
Ktaoua	587.09.19.	Rural commune	1221	11157	0	11157	
M'Hamid El Ghizlane	587.09.23.	Rural commune	1088	7764	5	7759	
Taftechna	587.09.29.	Rural commune	601	4787	0	4787	
Tagounite	587.09.33.	Rural commune	2210	17553	0	17553	
Tamegroute	587.09.35.	Rural commune	2072	19560	0	19560	
Ternata	587.09.43.	Rural commune	1538	14185	0	14185	
Tinzouline	587.09.45.	Rural commune	1453	13462	0	13462	
