= Zagora, Morocco =

Zagora زاكورة ⵜⴰⵣⴰⴳⵓⵔⵜ
- City
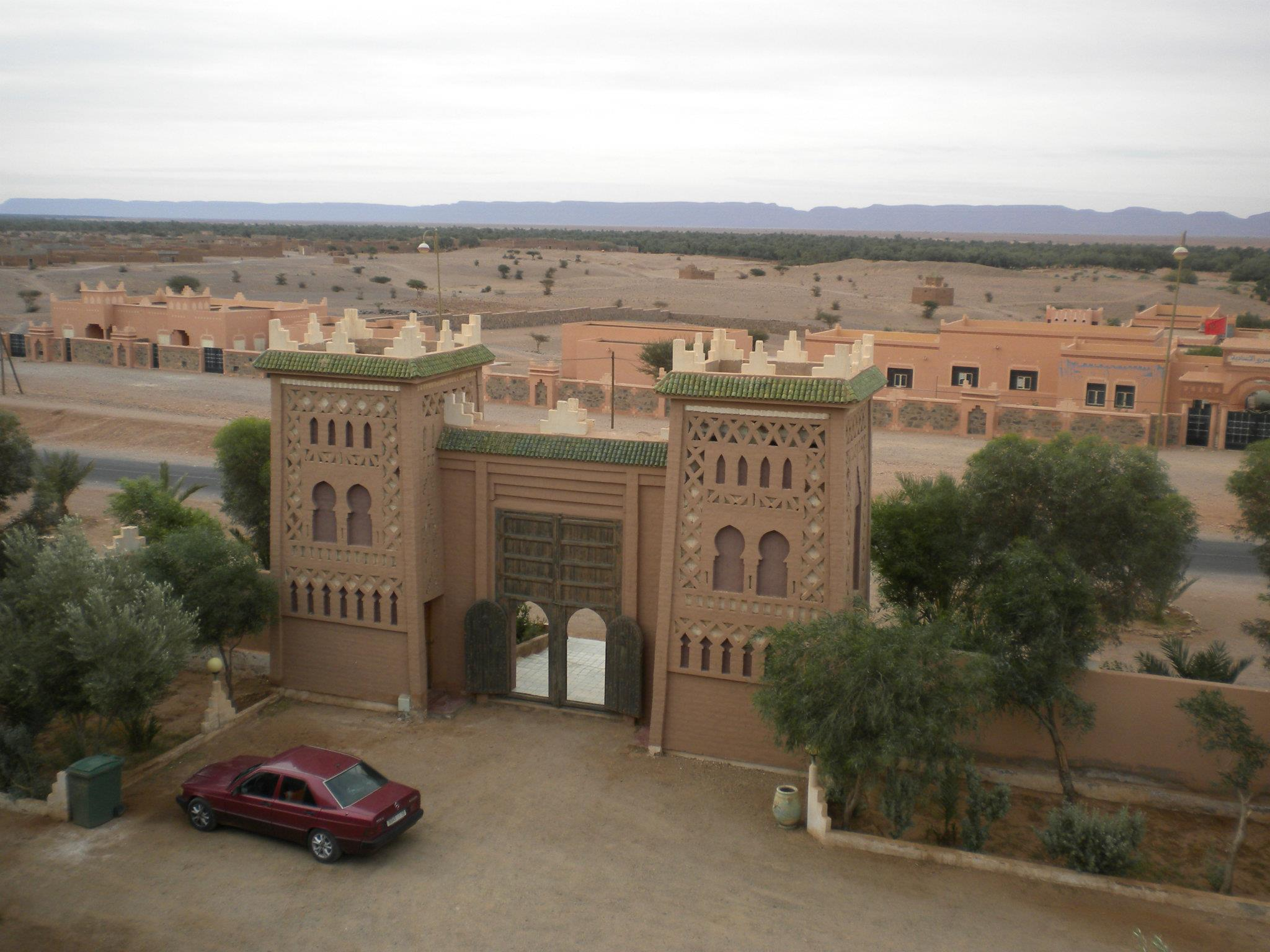
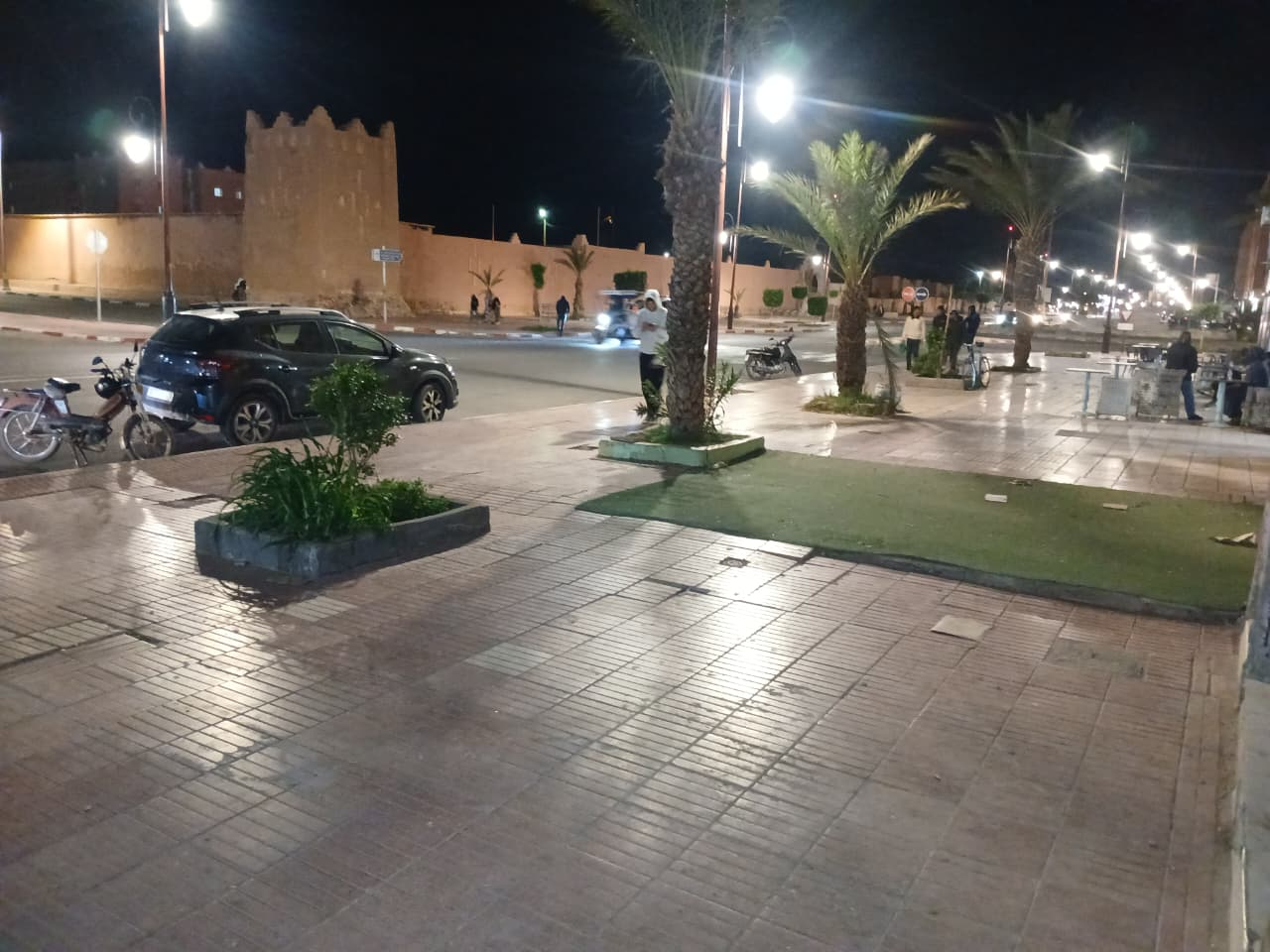
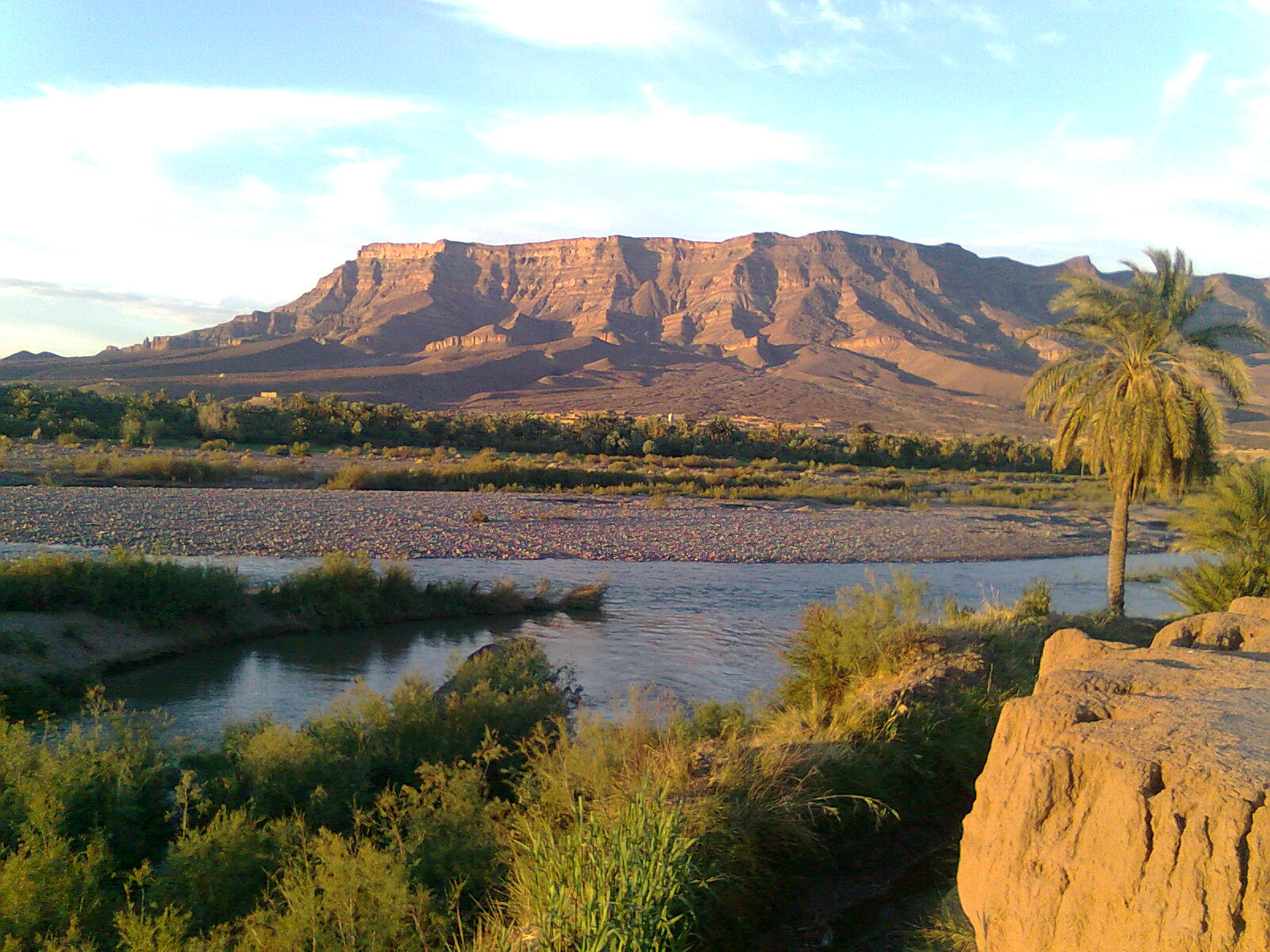
- Interactive map of Zagora
- Coordinates: 30°19′50″N 5°50′17″W
- Country: Morocco
- Region: Drâa-Tafilalet
- Province: Zagora

Population (2024)
  - Total: 42,275
- Time zone: UTC+0 (GMT)

Zagora (Arabic: زاكورة, Standard Moroccan Tamazight: ⵜⴰⵣⴰⴳⵓⵔⵜ) is a city located in the Draa River valley, it is the capital of Zagora Province, Drâa-Tafilalet region, Morocco.

On the base of the Zagora Mountain the remains of an Almoravid fortress can still be seen. The exact location of the former Almoravid mosque is still a matter of dispute. Each year the moussem (festival) of the Sufi saint Moulay Abdelkader Jilali is celebrated at Zagora.

Languages spoken in the city include Moroccan Arabic, Tachelhit and Tamazight.

A sign at the town border states "Tombouctou 52 days", the supposed time it takes to get to Timbuktu, Mali on foot or camel. The original sign has been replaced by a mural painting.

== Culture ==
Zagora is also noted for international events such as the Zagora Marathon and the Nomads Festival in M'Hamid.

== Local institutions ==
The weekly outdoor market (souk) is held on Sunday in the city center.

== Climate ==
Zagora has a hot desert climate (Köppen climate classification BWh).

Climate data for Zagora
Month	Jan	Feb	Mar	Apr	May	Jun	Jul	Aug	Sep	Oct	Nov	Dec	Year
Mean daily maximum °C (°F)	20.3 (68.5)	22.4 (72.3)	26.0 (78.8)	30.7 (87.3)	35.5 (95.9)	40.8 (105.4)	44.9 (112.8)	43.5 (110.3)	36.7 (98.1)	30.8 (87.4)	25.2 (77.4)	20.4 (68.7)	31.4 (88.6)
Mean daily minimum °C (°F)	3.8 (38.8)	5.9 (42.6)	9.6 (49.3)	13.1 (55.6)	17.1 (62.8)	21.4 (70.5)	25.1 (77.2)	25.0 (77.0)	19.9 (67.8)	15.1 (59.2)	10.6 (51.1)	5.5 (41.9)	14.3 (57.8)
Average precipitation mm (inches)	4 (0.2)	3 (0.1)	5 (0.2)	1 (0.0)	2 (0.1)	1 (0.0)	1 (0.0)	3 (0.1)	6 (0.2)	13 (0.5)	15 (0.6)	7 (0.3)	61 (2.4)
Source: Climate-data.org

== Features ==
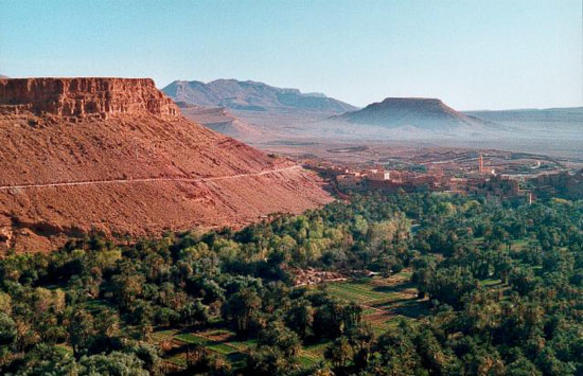

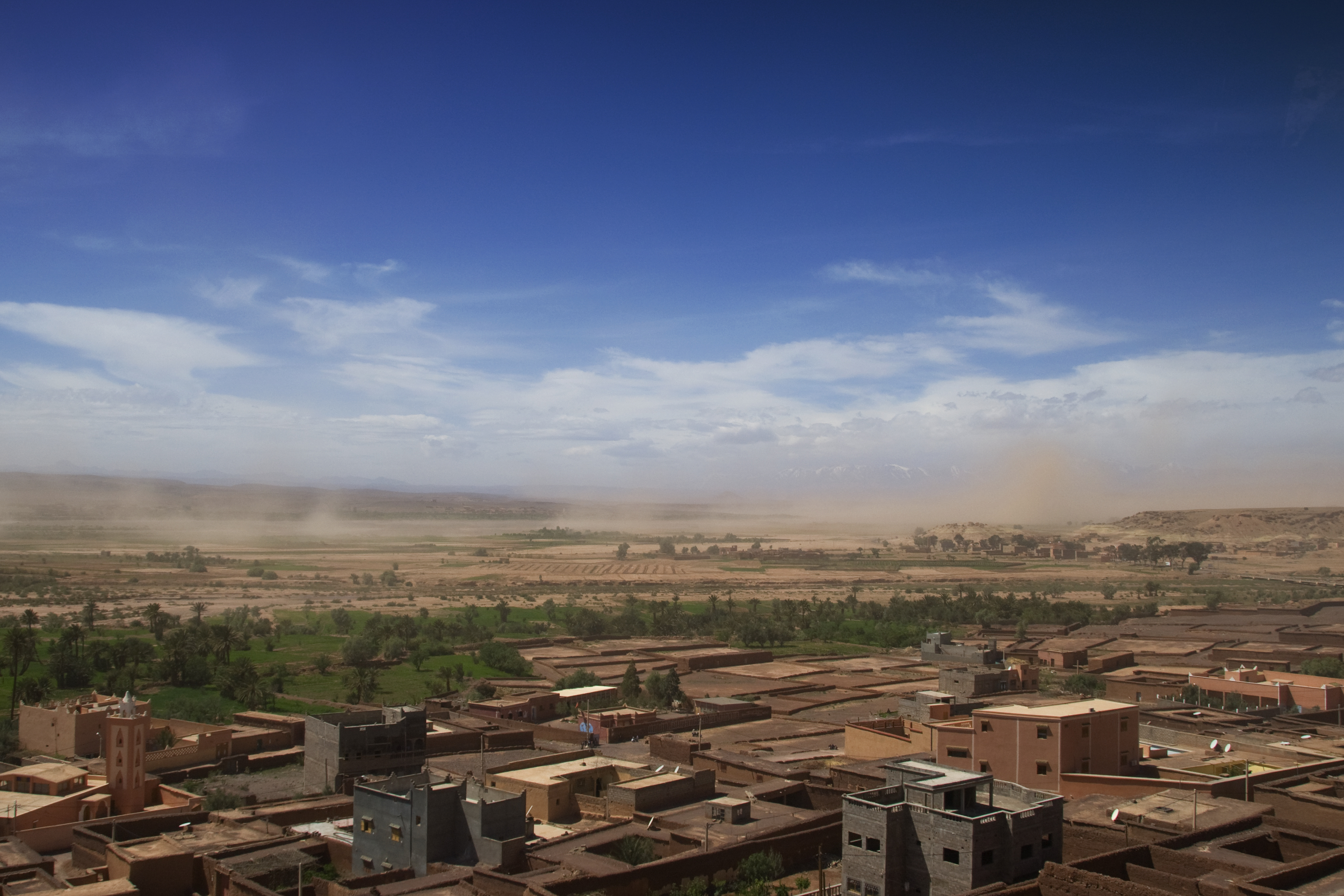

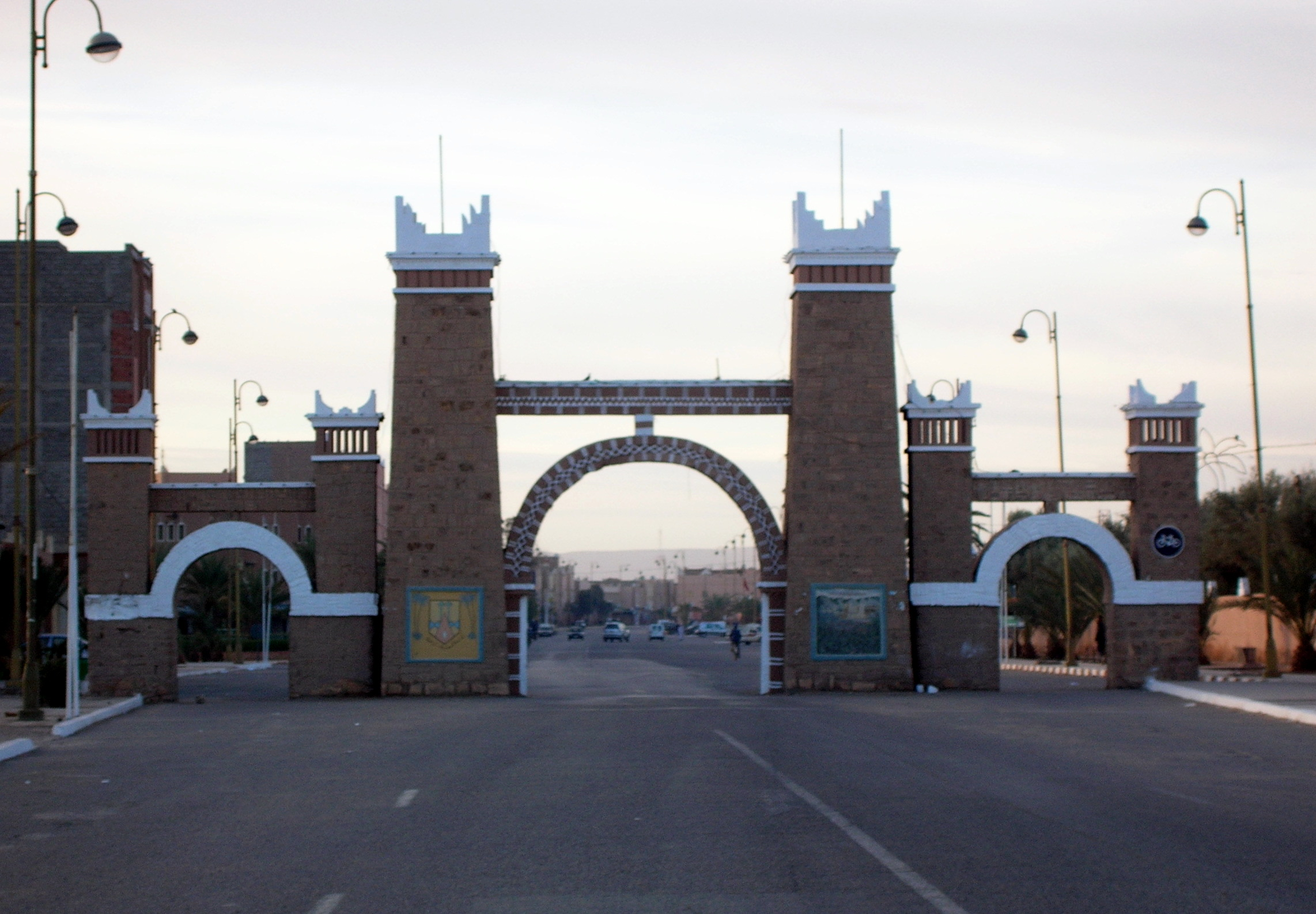

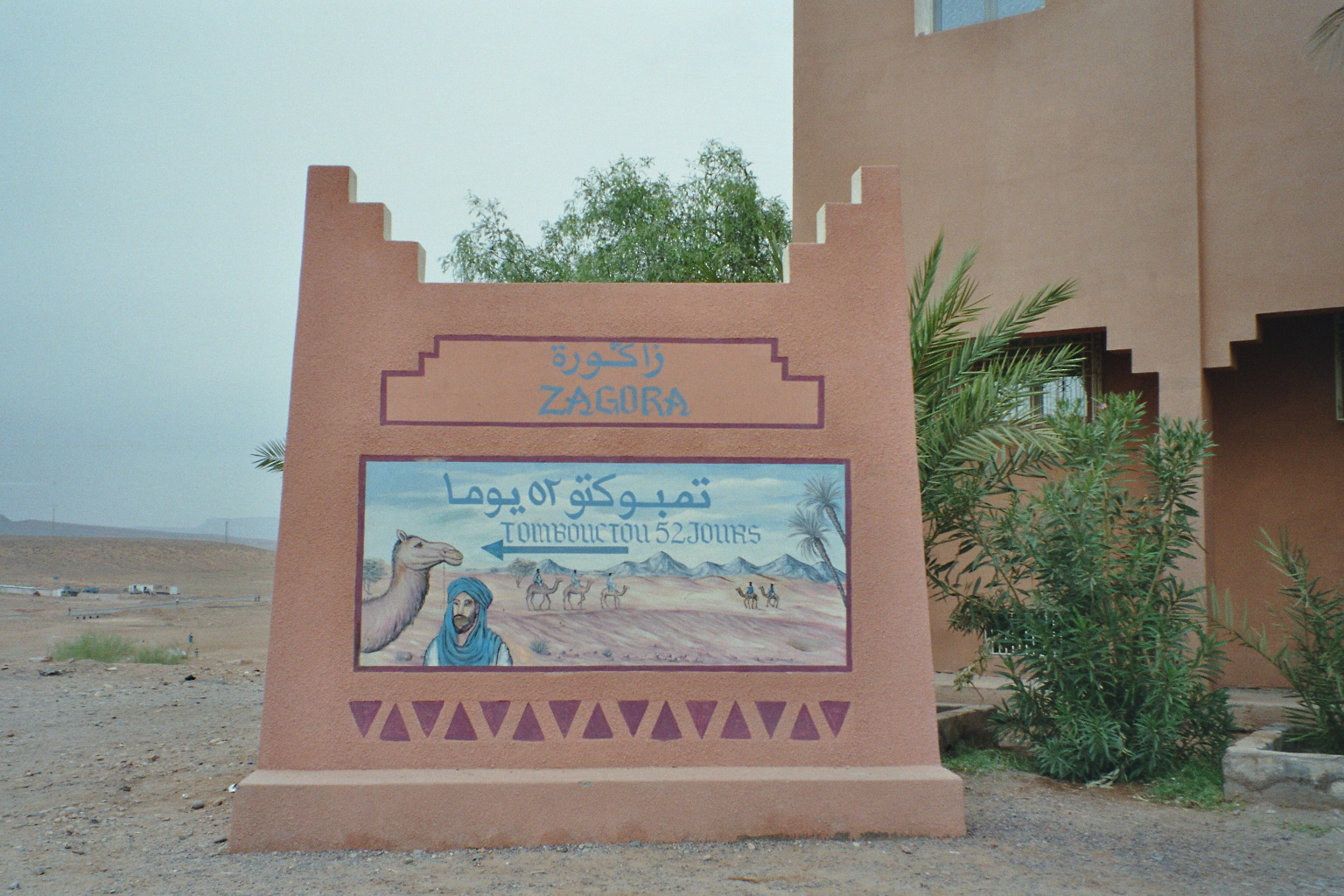

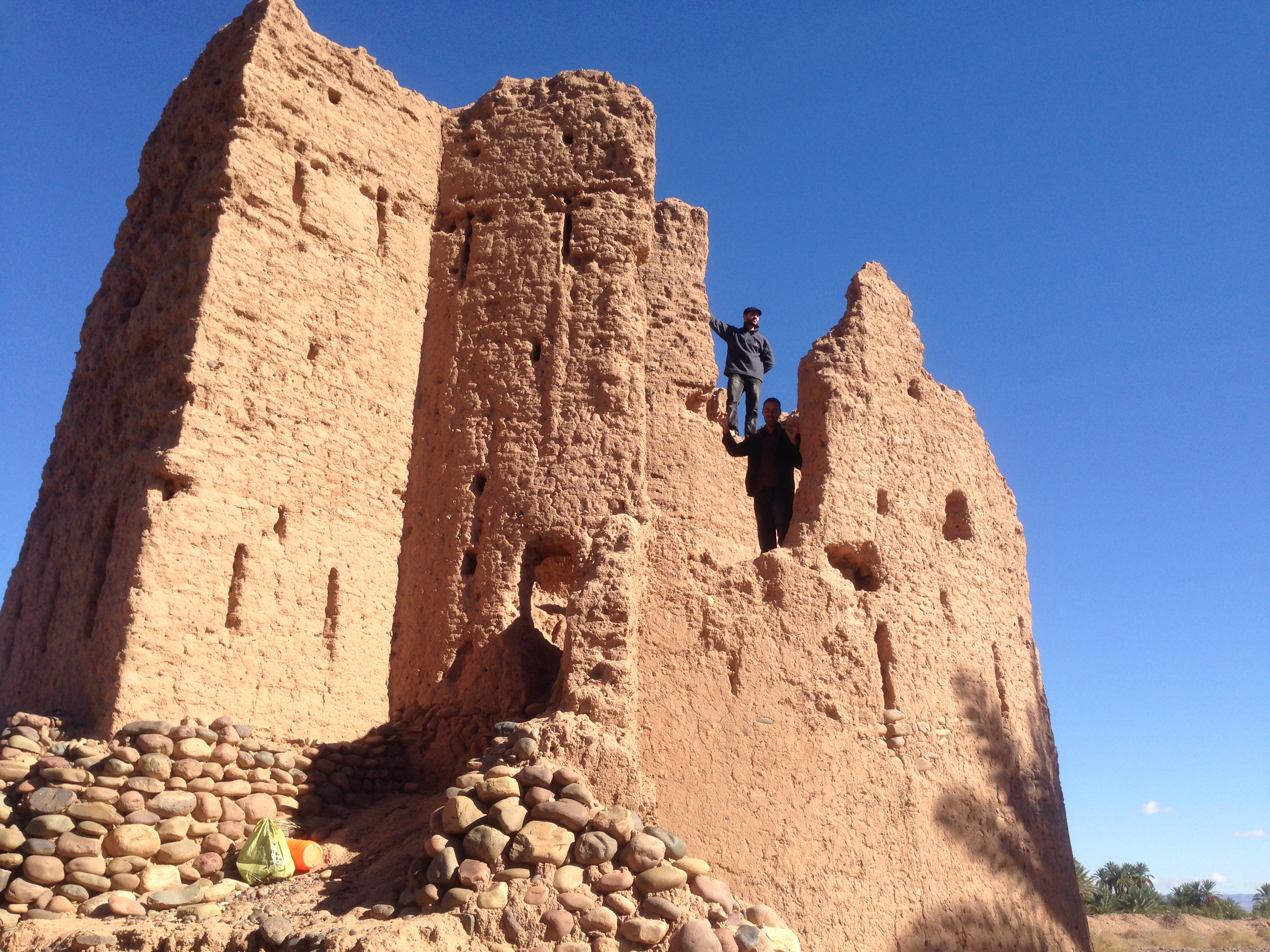
Military castle
