= Guelmim-Es Semara =

Guelmim-Es Semara كلميم السمارة
- Region
- Location in Morocco
- Coordinates: 28°09′N 10°04′W
- Country: Morocco
- Created: 1997
- Abolished: September 2015
- Capital: Guelmim

Area
  - Total: 122,825 km^{2} (47,423 sq mi)

Population (2014 census)
  - Total: 501,921
  - Density: 4.08647/km^{2} (10.5839/sq mi)
- Time zone: UTC+0 (WET)
  - Summer (DST): UTC+1 (WEST)

Guelmim-Es Semara (Arabic: كلميم السمارة) was one of the sixteen former regions of Morocco from 1997 to 2015. It covered an area of 122,825 square kilometres (47,423 sq mi) and had a population of 501,921 (2014 census). The regional capital was Guelmim.

== Geography ==
The southern half of Guelmin-Es Semara formed part of the Western Sahara. The region was bordered to the north by Souss-Massa-Drâa and to the west by Laayoune-Boujdour-Sakia El Hamra, with the Algerian province of Tindouf to the east. Its disputed territory in the Western Sahara bordered the Mauritanian Tiris Zemmour Region. Guelmin-Es Semara had a coastline on the Atlantic Ocean, with the Spanish Canary Islands lying off it. The Draa River, at 1,100 km the longest in Morocco, flowed through the region into the Atlantic Ocean near Tan-Tan.

The region was made up of the following provinces:

- Assa-Zag Province
- Es Smara Province
- Guelmim Province
- Tan-Tan Province
- Tata Province

== Municipalities by population (2004 census) ==
- Guelmin, Guelmim Province: 95,599
- Tan-Tan, Tan-Tan Province: 60,560
- Es Semara, Es Smara Province: 33,910
- Tata, Tata Province: 15,192
- Bouizakarne, Guelmim Province: 11,982
- Assa, Assa-Zag Province: 11,667
- Foum Zguid, Tata Province: 9,611
- Zag, Assa-Zag Province: 7,751
- El Ouatia, Tan-Tan Province: 6,294
- Akka, Tata Province: 6,312
- Fam El Hisn, Tata Province: 6,183
