= Tissint meteorite =

Meteorite that fell in Tata, Guelmim-Es-Semara, Morocco in 2011

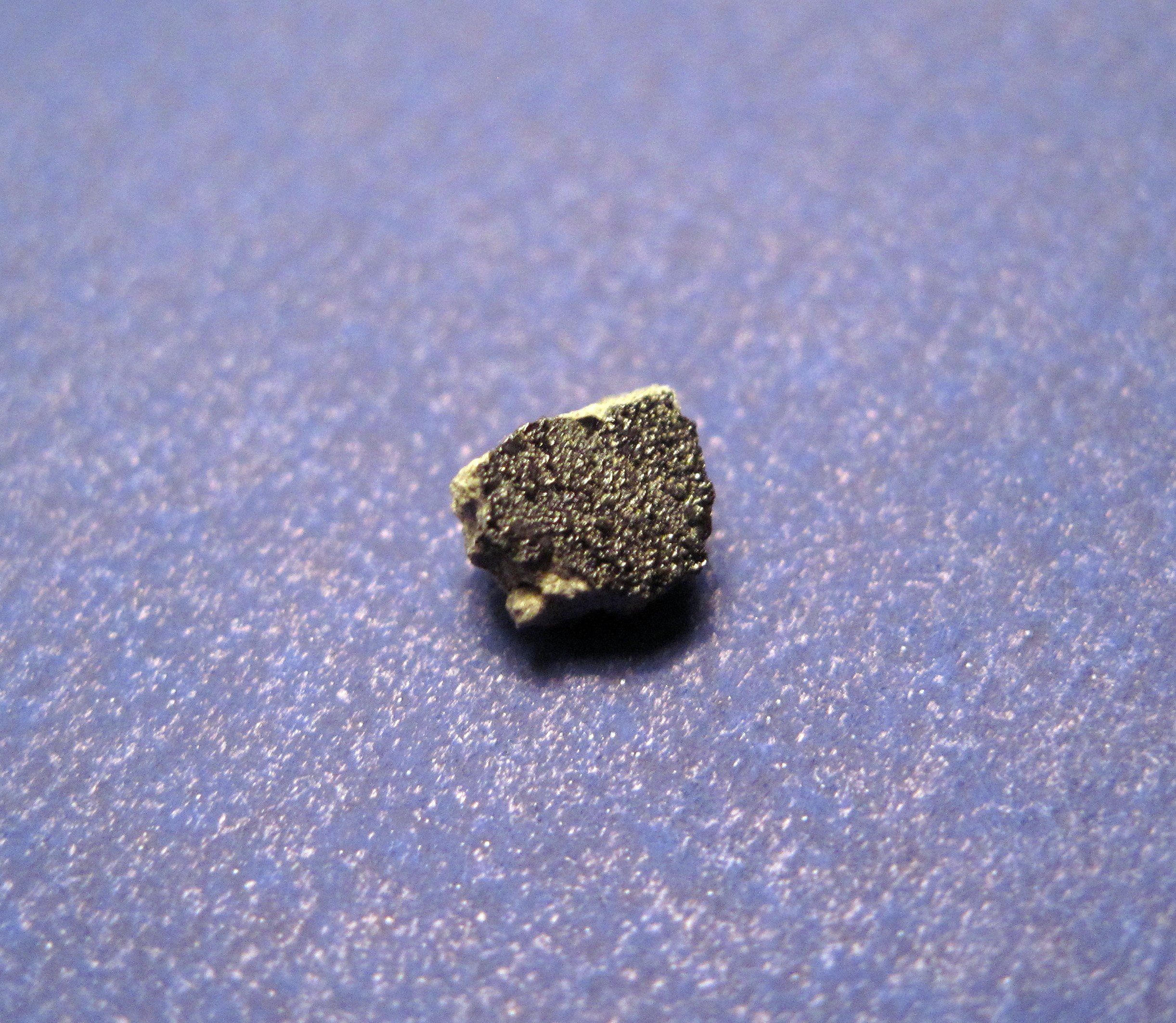
- Piece of the meteorite with glossy black fusion crust and a light gray matrix
- Type: Achondrite
- Class: Martian meteorite
- Group: Shergottite
- Country: Morocco
- Region: Tata Province, Guelmim-Es Semara
- Observed fall: Yes
- Fall date: 18 July 2011
- TKW: 12 kilograms (26 lb)-15 kilograms (33 lb)
- Related media on Wikimedia Commons

The Tissint meteorite is a Martian meteorite that fell in Tata Province in the Guelmim-Es Semara region of Morocco on 18 July 2011. Tissint is the fifth Martian meteorite that people have witnessed falling to Earth, and the first since 1962. Pieces of the meteorite are on display at several museums, including the Museum of Natural History of Vienna and the Natural History Museum in London.

== History ==
On 18 July 2011, around 2 AM local time, a bright fireball was observed by several people in the Oued Drâa valley, east of Tata, Morocco. One observer reported that the fireball was initially yellow in color, then turned green, illuminating the entire area before it appeared to break into two pieces; two sonic booms were heard over the valley.

In October 2011, nomads began to find very fresh, fusion-crusted stones in a remote area of the Oued Drâa intermittent watershed, centered about 50 kilometres (31 mi) ESE of Tata and 48 kilometres (30 mi) SSW of Tissint village, near the Oued El Gsaïb drainage and also near El Ga’ïdat plateau known as Hmadat Boû Rba’ine. The largest pieces were recovered in the El Ga’ïdat plateau, and the smallest ones (a few grams) were found closer to the El Aglâb (Laglab) mountains. One 47 g (1.7 oz) crusted stone was documented as found at 29°28.917’ N, 7°36.674’ W.

Tissint was named after the town of Tissint, 48 kilometres (30 mi) away from the fall site.

Up until 1990, only five meteorites had been found in Morocco, but since then, more meteorites have landed in the area. Current As of 2012 records show that meteorite hunters have discovered 754 at specific sites in Morocco as well as thousands of others from uncertain locations. After the increases in meteorite falls, a market for meteorites drove the emergence of a meteorite prospecting industry in northwestern Africa and Oman. The rocks have been quickly brought out of the country into collections abroad because the significant discoveries resulted in high prices for the rocks (an auction on 14 October 2012 included fragments of the Tissent meteorite). This made it difficult for researchers such as Hasnaa Chennaoui-Aoudjehane, the only one who has studied the meteorite, to have access to samples for her research and leaves Morocco with few remains of the meteorites that fell there.

== Physical characteristics ==
Dozens of fragments with masses ranging from 0.2 to 1,282 grams (0.0071 to 45.2212 oz) were collected, totaling roughly 12–15 kilograms (26–33 lb). The rocks are variably coated by a shining black fusion crust, characterized by thicker layers on exterior ridges and glossy regions above interior olivine phenocrysts and impact melt pockets. Some stones have a thinner secondary fusion crust on some surfaces, and some are broken in places, revealing the interior. The exposed interior of the stones appears pale green-grey in color, with mm-sized, pale yellow olivine phenocrysts with sparse vesicular pockets and thin veins of black glass.

== Petrology and origin ==
The meteorite was ejected from the surface of Mars between 700,000 and 1.1 million years ago. Tissint appears to be derived from a deep mantle source region that was unlike any of the other known Martian shergottite meteorites.

The material is highly shocked and indicates it was ejected during the largest impact excavation in record. Given the widely dispersed shock melting observed in Tissint, alteration of other soft minerals (carbonates, halides, sulfates and even organics), especially along grain boundaries, might have occurred. This may in part explain the lack of such minerals in Tissint, but it is unknown if it is of biotic origin.

The meteorite fragments were recovered within days after the fall, so it is considered an "uncontaminated" meteorite. The meteorite displays evidence of water weathering, and there are signs of elements being carried into cracks in the rocks by water or fluid, which is something never seen before in a Martian meteorite. Specifically, scientists found carbon and nitrogen-containing compounds associated with hydrothermal mineral inclusions. One team reported measuring an elevated carbon-13 (^{13}C) ratio, while another team reported a low ^{13}C ratio as compared to the content in Mars' atmosphere and crust, and suggested that it may be of biological origin, but the researchers also noted that there are several geological processes that could explain that without invoking complex life-processes; for example, it could be of meteoritic origin and would have been mixed with Martian soil when meteorites and comets impact the surface of Mars, or of volcanic origin.

An analysis by Hasnaa Chennaoui-Aoudjehane, a Moroccan meteoriticist of Hassan II University in Casablanca, determined that the meteorite is a depleted picritic shergottite similar to EETA79001 lithology A (EETA79001A). The internal structure of the meteorite includes olivine macrocrysts (or nodules) embedded into a fine-grained matrix made of pyroxene and feldspar glass. The matrix has numerous cracks filled with black glassy material. Like other shergottites Tissint meteorite is enriched in magnesium oxide and other compatible elements such as nickel and cobalt. The bulk composition is also depleted in light rare earths and other incompatible elements such as beryllium, lithium and uranium. However the glassy material is enriched in these elements.

The data on refractory trace elements, sulfur and fluorine as well as the data on the isotopic composition of nitrogen, argon and carbon released upon heating from the matrix and glass veins in the meteorite unambiguously indicate the presence of a Martian surface component including trapped atmospheric gases. So, the influence of in situ Martian weathering can be distinguished from terrestrial contamination in the meteorite. The Martian weathering features in Tissint are compatible with the results of spacecraft observations of Mars, and Tissint has a cosmic ray dating exposure age of 0.7 ± 0.3 Ma—consistent with the reading of many other shergottites, notably EETA79001, suggesting that they were ejected from Mars during the same event.

The overall composition of the Tissint meteorite corresponds to that of aluminium-poor ferroan basaltic rock, which likely originated as a result of magmatic activity at the surface of Mars. These basalt then underwent weathering by fluids, which deposited minerals enriched in incompatible elements in fissures and cracks. A later impact on the surface of Mars melted the leached material forming black glassy veins. Finally shergottites were ejected from Mars about 0.7 million years ago.

== See also ==
- Glossary of meteoritics
