= List of monuments and sites in Tata, Morocco =

Moroccan monuments list

This is a list of sites and monuments that are classified or inventoried by the Moroccan ministry of culture around Tata.

== Monuments and sites in Tata ==
Image		Name	Location	Coordinates	Identifier
	Upload Photo	Ksar of Akka	Akka	29°23'35"N, 8°15'41"W	pc_architecture/sanae:220126
	Upload Photo	Ksar of Tissint	Tissint	29°54'7"N, 7°18'56"W	pc_architecture/sanae:220120
	Upload Photo	Tiggane	Tata	29°36'23.904"N, 8°1'2.406"W	pc_architecture/sanae:150103
	Upload Photo	Jbel Feggoussat	Tissint	30°4'48.432"N, 6°52'50.750"W	pc_architecture/sanae:150101
