= Ifrane Atlas-Saghir =

Village in Guelmim-Oued Noun, Morocco

Ifrane Atlas-Saghir Ifrane, Anti-Atlas Oufrane
- Village and rural commune
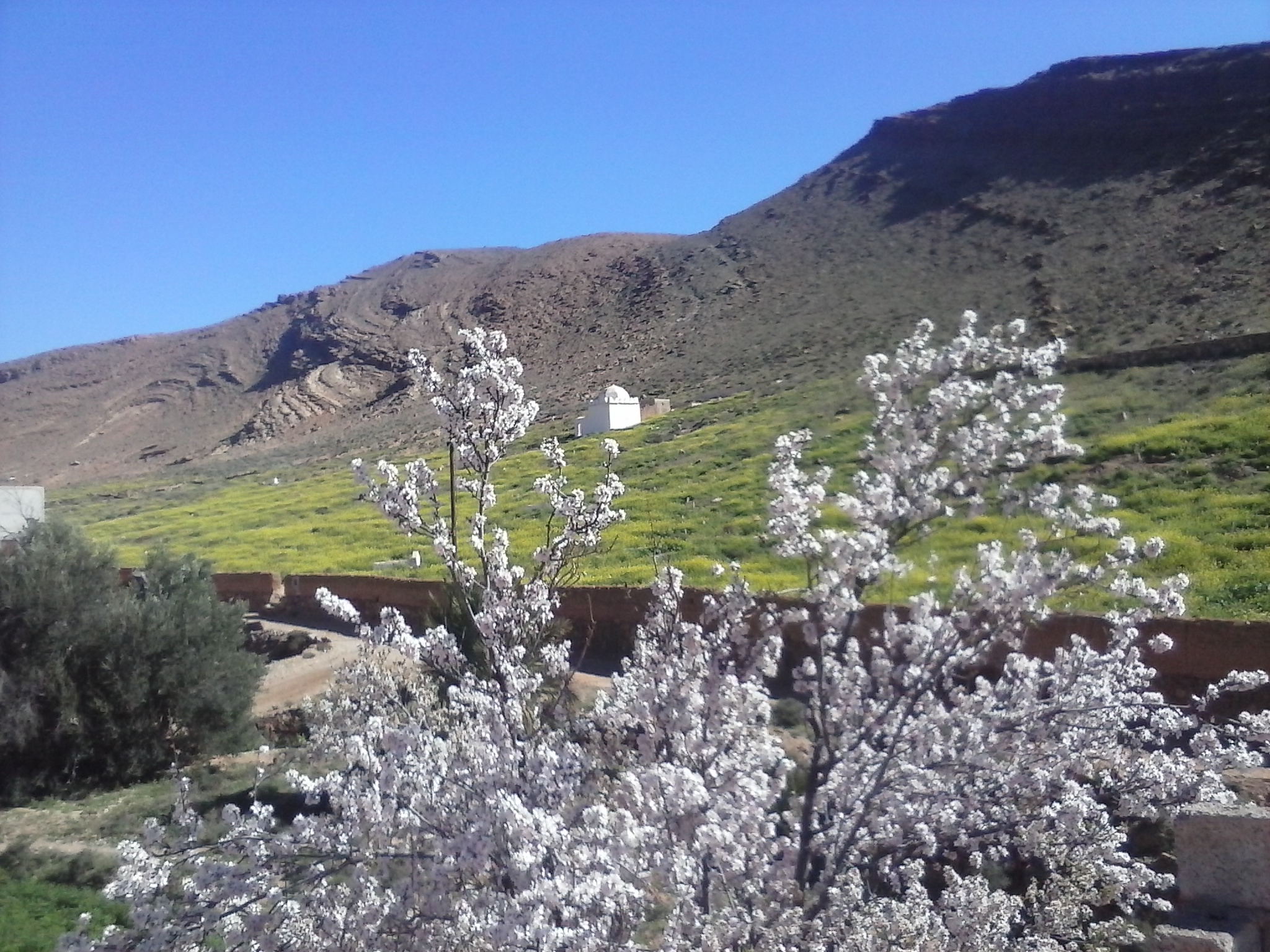
- Interactive map of Ifrane Atlas-Saghir
- Coordinates: 29°12′38.2″N 9°29′34.35″W
- Country: Morocco
- Region: Guelmim-Oued Noun
- Province: Guelmim

Population (2004)
  - Total: 11,950
- Time zone: UTC+0 (GMT)

Ifrane Atlas-Saghir or Ifrane, Anti-Atlas (Arabic: إفران الأطلس الصغير, meaning cave), is a village and commune in southern Morocco, located between Guelmim and Tiznit, with a population of about 12,000 inhabitants. The town, its history, and its arid valley, oasis, and surrounding mountains, attract tourism from hikers and Jewish pilgrims. Known to Jews as Oufrane, it is believed to be the oldest Jewish community in Morocco, speculatively dated to the year 361 BCE.

== Name ==
The name Ifrane is derived from the Tamazight word ifri, which means cave or cavern. There are several in the area.

== History ==
The town is commonly believed to be the oldest Jewish community in Morocco, speculatively dated to the year 361 BCE.

Ifrane Atlas-Saghir was an important trading post and market for the caravan trade moving across the Sahara to the sea-coast, until the trade faded away in the late 1800s. The area is now populated by the Chleuh (Amazighen Berbers) group, who today generally maintain their traditional way of life.

== Jewish community ==
Ifrane Atlas-Saghir was an ancient home to a 2,000-year-old Jewish population, the oldest in Morocco, until 1958 when they left as a group to settle in Israel. Today an important Jewish pilgrimage site is located there, being the site of a mass suicide of the 1700s, undertaken in the face of a brutal persecution by a local sorcerer. The remains of Jewish cemeteries are also known today... "in the gorges of the Oufrane, there are ancient cemeteries with headstones that have inscriptions in Hebrew." The descendants of Maklouf have maintained an oral history of their family's fate following the massacre, which their great-great-great-great-grandmother managed to escape. Due to the importance of Ifrane's Jewish heritage, a synagogue has been restored in the abandoned mellah there, by the Foundation for Jewish-Moroccan Cultural Heritage. The district's long-standing Jewish culture has left another lasting legacy, in the form of the continuing observance of some aspects of Jewish folklore among the local Berbers.

== Notable people ==
- Fatima Tabaamrant
- Abdellah Baha
- Mustapha Hadji
- Youssouf Hadji

== See also ==
- Bouizakarne
- Taghjijt
- Guelmim
- Noun River
