= Iriqui National Park =

National park in Morocco

- IUCN category II (national park)
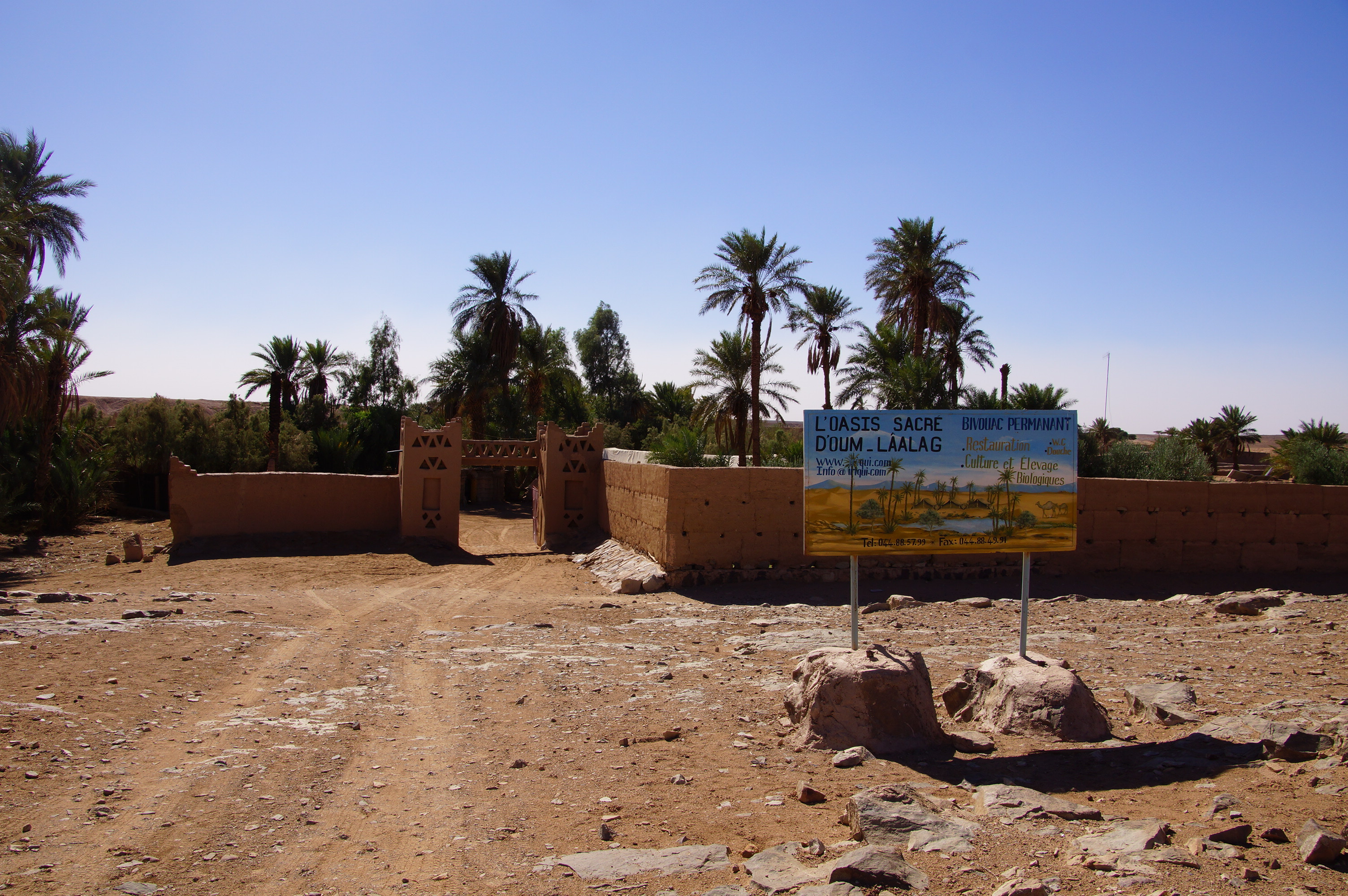
- L’Oasis sacrée d’oum Lâalag in the Iriqui National Park

- Location within Morocco
- Location: Morocco
- Nearest city: Foum Zguid
- Coordinates: 29°50′29.936322″N 6°31′2.110519″W
- Area: 1,230 km^{2} (470 sq mi)
- Established: 1994
- Governing body: Kingdom of Morocco: High Commission for Water, Forests and Desertification Control

Iriqui National Park was set up in 1994 as a national park in Morocco with 123,000 hectares.

== Location ==
Iriqui National Park occupies the space between the Draa River and the South foothills of the Anti-Atlas, in the provinces of Zagora and Tata.

== Flora and fauna ==
The park is characterized by typical desert landscape of southern Morocco. The vegetation is represented by a wooded steppe and savanna with acacias. Some of its dunes are covered by tamarix.

During wet periods, Lake Iriqui becomes a temporary wetland and a port of call and wintering site for many migratory water birds, including flamingos, coots and geese, which gives the park an important ecological character. The rehabilitation of the wetland was one of the main objectives, when the park was created.

In the park there are houbara bustards, North African ostriches, barbary sheep, dorcas gazelles, oryxes and striped hyenas. There is also a large number of reptiles such as lizard, horned vipers, monitor lizards, chameleons, geckos and different varieties of snakes.

== Human population ==
The region has a few families settled inside the park, The Iriqui area is the main place for grazing because of its good grazing potential.

== Tourism ==
The rich landscape and cultural heritage of the region gives the park an important ecotourism potential that will be a lever for local economic development. Its establishment is part of a strategy to boost tourism in southern Morocco, which might become ultimately an important lever for the promotion and development of the Saharan areas.
