= Taghjijt =

- Town
- Interactive map of Taghjijt
- Coordinates: 29°03′23″N 9°25′41″W
- Country: Morocco
- Region: Guelmim-Oued Noun
- Province: Guelmim

Population (2004)
  - Total: 6,983
- Time zone: UTC+0 (GMT)

Taghjijt is a town in Guelmim Province, Guelmim-Oued Noun, Morocco. According to the 2004 census it has a population of 6,983.

== See also ==
- Ifrane Atlas-Saghir
