= Foum Zguid =

Foum Zguid فم زڭيد ⵉⵎⵉ ⵏ ⵣⴳⵉⴷ
- Town
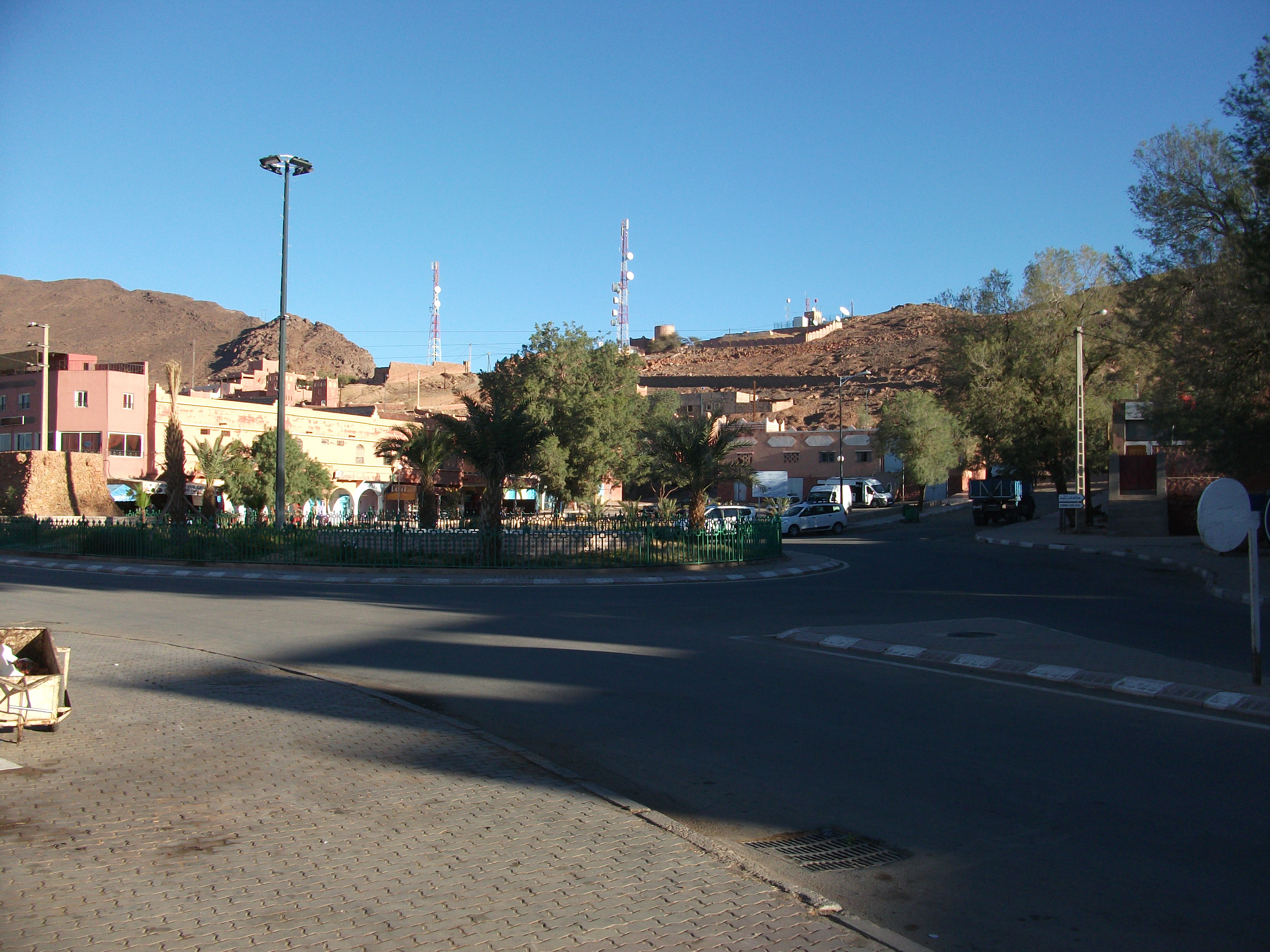
- Foum Zguid City Center.
- Interactive map of Foum Zguid
- Coordinates: 30°05′07″N 6°52′25″W
- Country: Morocco
- Region: Souss-Massa
- Province: Tata Province

Population (2004)
  - Total: 9,630
- Time zone: UTC+0 (GMT)
- Postal code: 84150

Foum Zguid (Arabic: فم زڭيد, lit. 'mouth of the Zguid river', Standard Moroccan Tamazight: ⵉⵎⵉ ⵏ ⵣⴳⵉⴷ) is a town in Tata Province, Souss-Massa, southeastern Morocco. According to a 2004 census, it had a population of 9,630, the second-highest in the province after the capital Tata.

Foum Zguid is situated on the N12 highway to the northeast of Tata. Iriqui National Park is to the south of Foum Zguid, as is the border with Algeria, but no roads lead to either.
