= Tasguent agadir =

Coordinates: 29°54′49″N 8°44′43″W

Tasguent Agadir
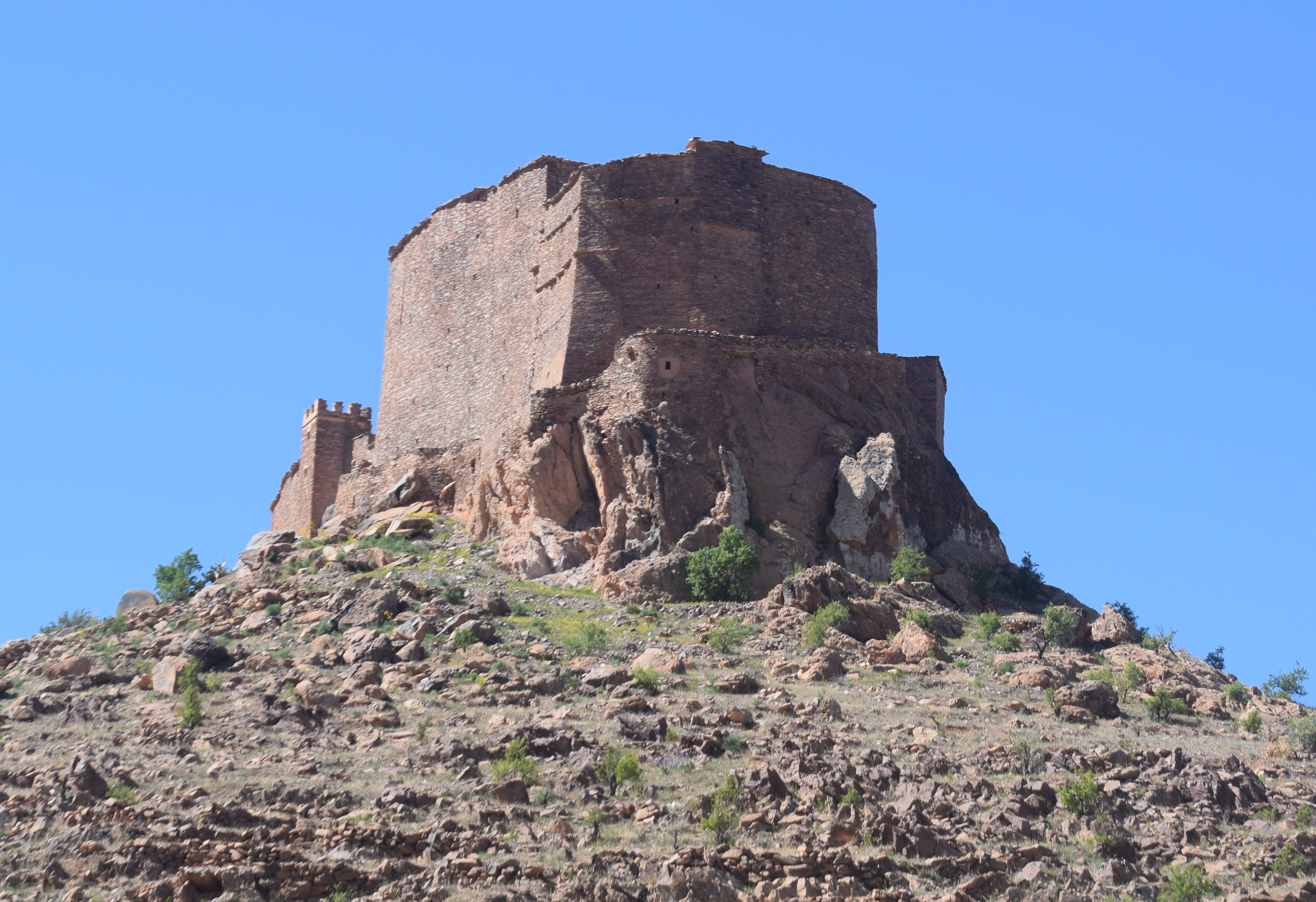
- The Tasguent agadir

General information
- Location: Amzrou, Taroudant Province
- Country: Morocco
- Elevation: 1573m
- Completed: 1200-1500

The Tasguent agadir is a fortified collective granary built between 1200 and 1500 and located above the Moroccan village of Amzrou. It stopped being used as a granary in the 19th century, but became known during the 20th century as one of the best preserved agadirs of the Anti-Atlas.

== History ==
=== Construction and usage ===
The Tasguent agadir was built in stages over the centuries, the walled square being probably the most recent element. The age of the oldest walls is estimated between 500 and 800 years old.

The main role of the agadirs was to shelter the crops (and possibly the inhabitants) from attacks. The Tasguent agadir is divided into individual cells spread over several floors and whose contents are recorded on wooden rolls. It lost its function like most of the agadirs of the region with the pacification and the improvement of the food situation that accompanies the colonial period. Unlike other adobe constructions in southern Morocco (tighremts and kasbahs), which have also become useless, the agadir of Tasguent was possibly used in the 19th and 20th centuries by the inhabitants for various purposes.

=== Tourism ===
In 1950, at the onset of tourism in Morocco which preceded independence, the Agadir of Tasguent was the only agadir and one of the only points of interest in the Anti-Atlas to be registered.

In 2000, the Tasguent and Id Aïssa in Amtoudi agadirs, are considered as the two principal examples of agadirs in Morocco.

However, the development of tourism in agadirs created important social problems. The agadirs have long been used, beyond their defensive function, as the main life center for the local tribes. This social and spiritual function can be lost when those fortresses are adapted for tourism. The opposite is also observed, the difficulty of maintaining these climate sensitive places mainly built in adobe leads to their rapid deterioration without substantial investment often inseparable from tourism.

== Interior layout ==
The forecourt of the agadir was probably used to accommodate livestock in times of crisis. The building is built on a rock base and is defended by a defensive wall. The individual granaries (sometimes called "cisterns" or "cells") are lined up side by side and one above the other in three to six stories. The cells on the upper floors are accessible by stone steps or notched trunks. Each storage cell is closed by a wooden door, often decorated and usually with an opening allowing the free movement of cats ensuring a low rodent population. The celles are separated from each other by stone partitions.

== Image gallery ==
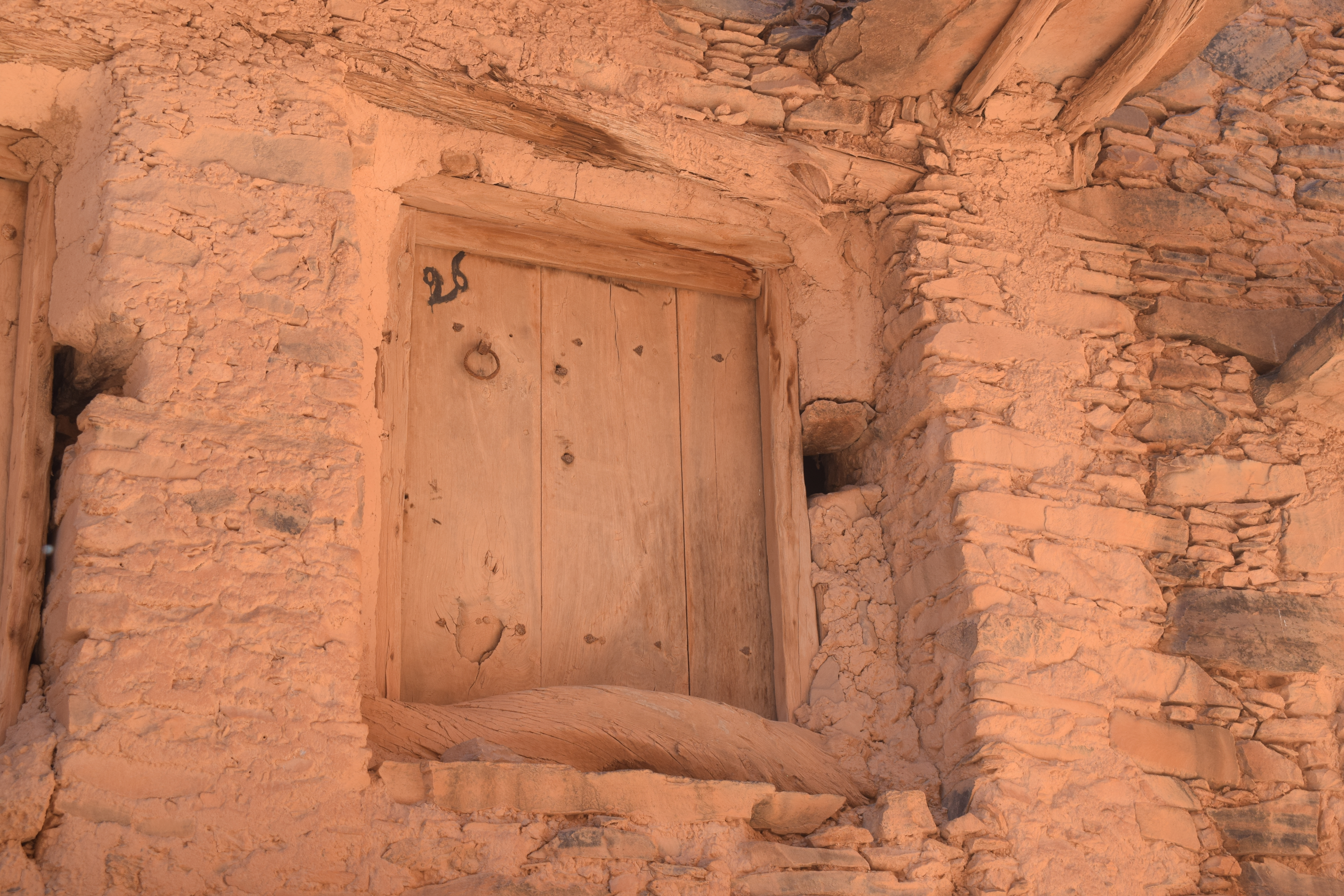
granary door

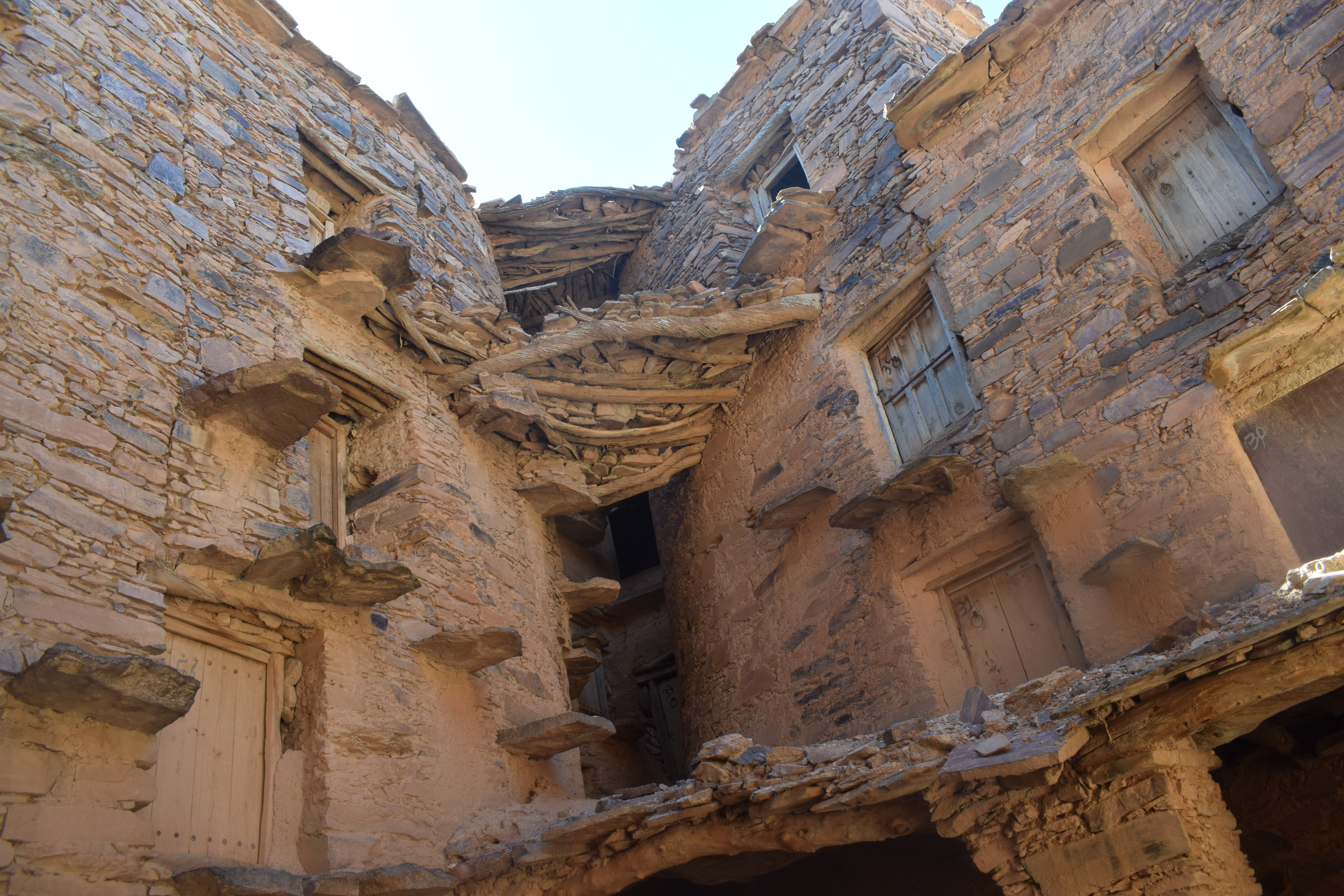
interior view

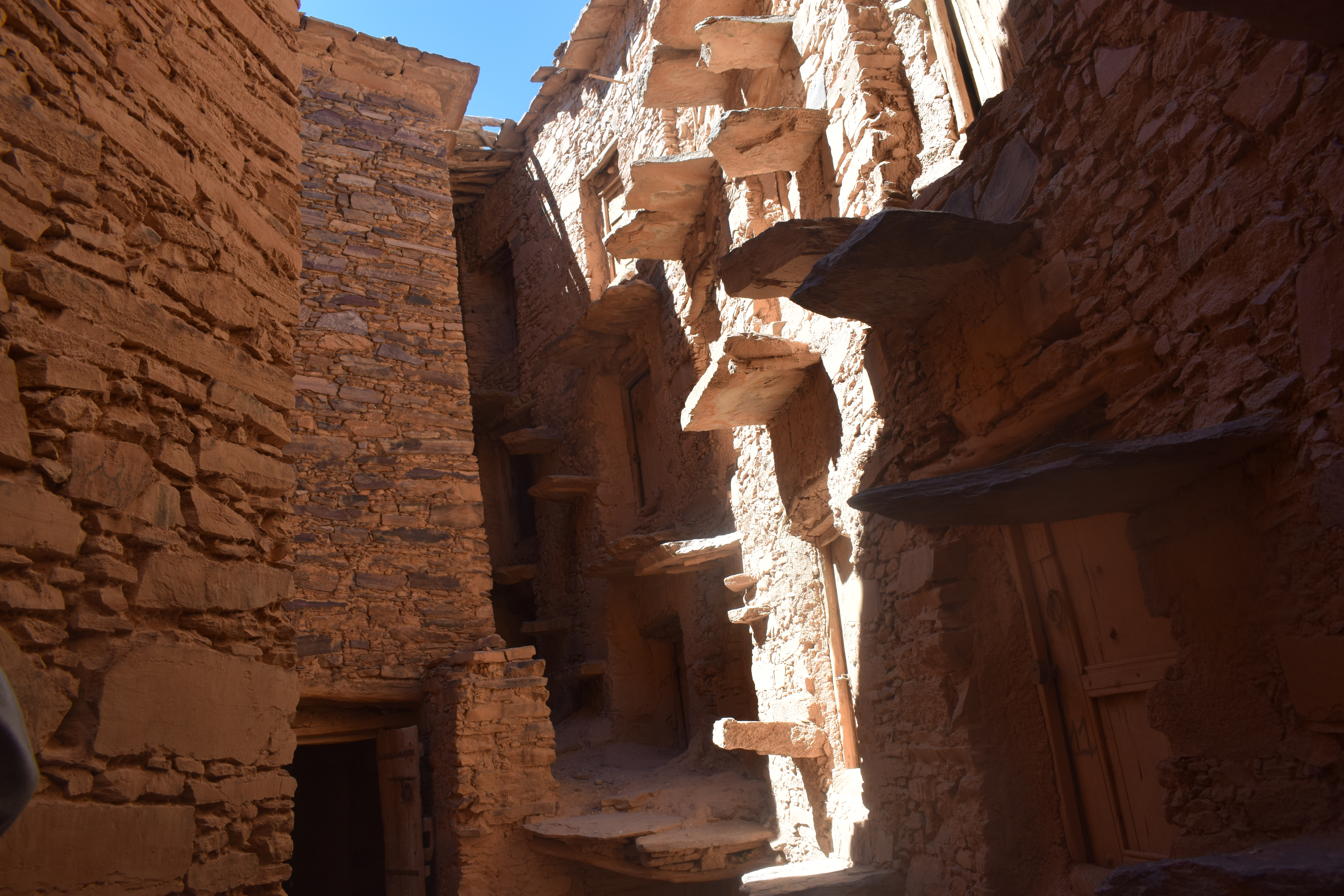
interior view

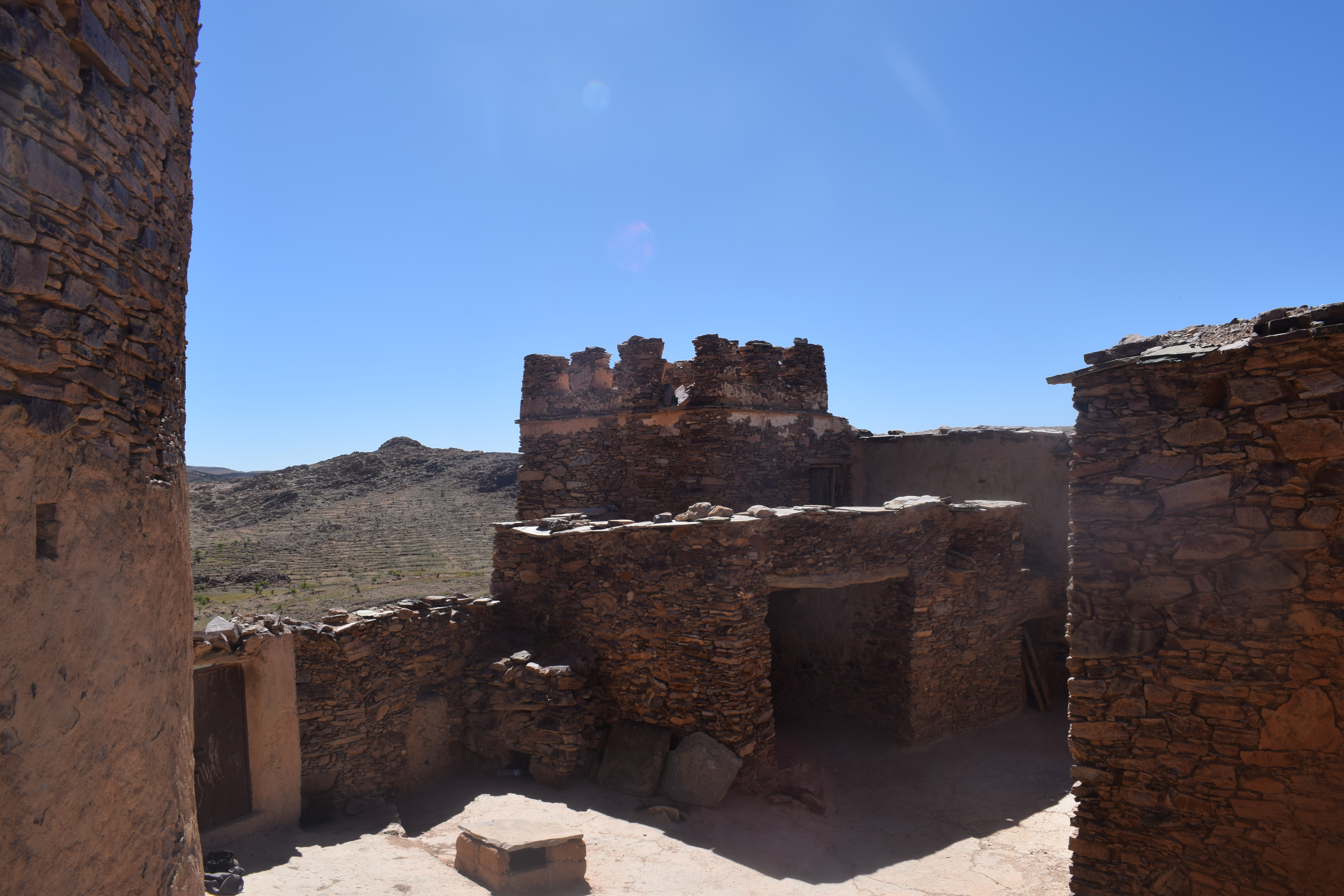
roof of the agadir

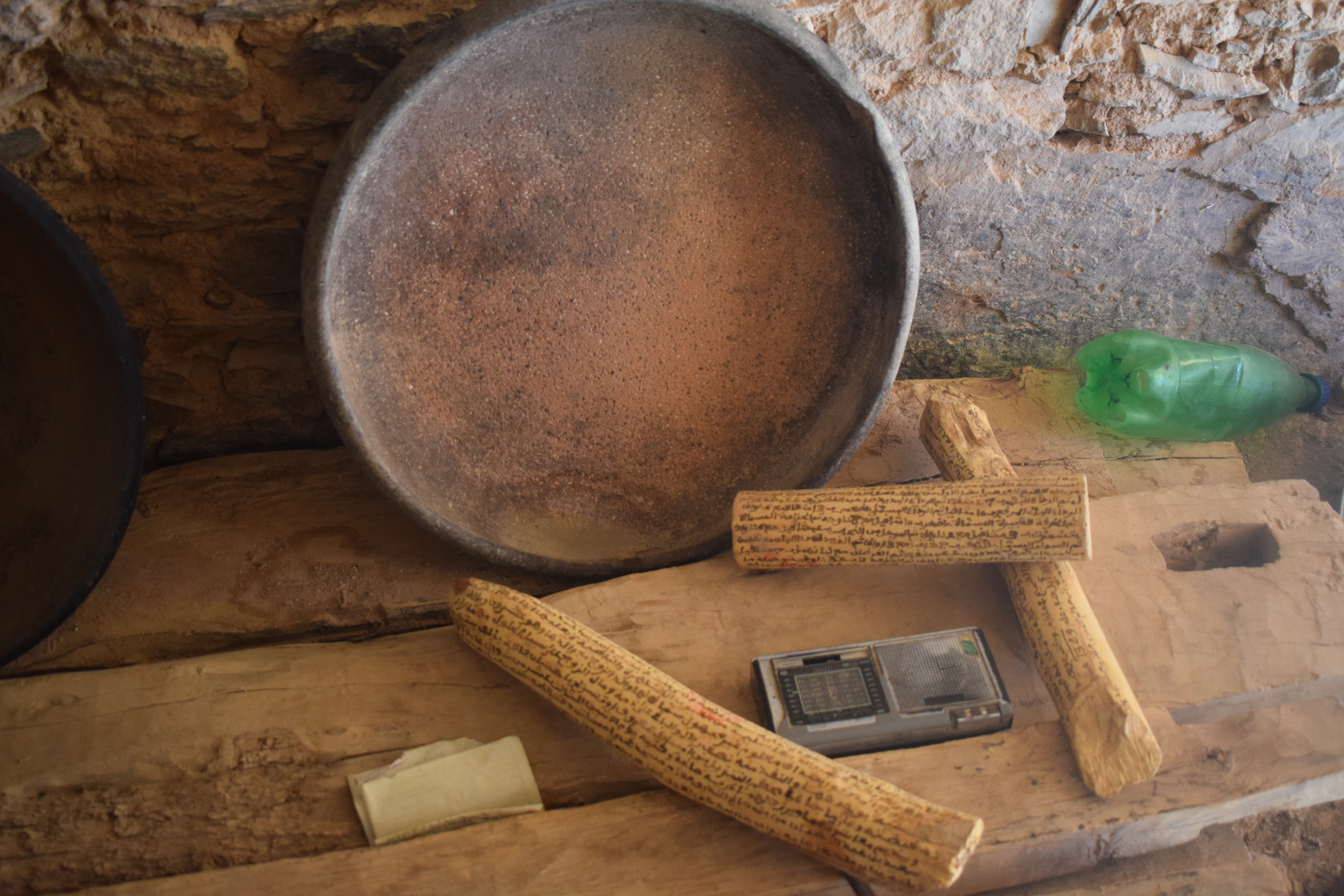
wooden rolls used to record the contents of the granaries
