= Agadir (granary) =

Fortified communal granary found in the Maghreb

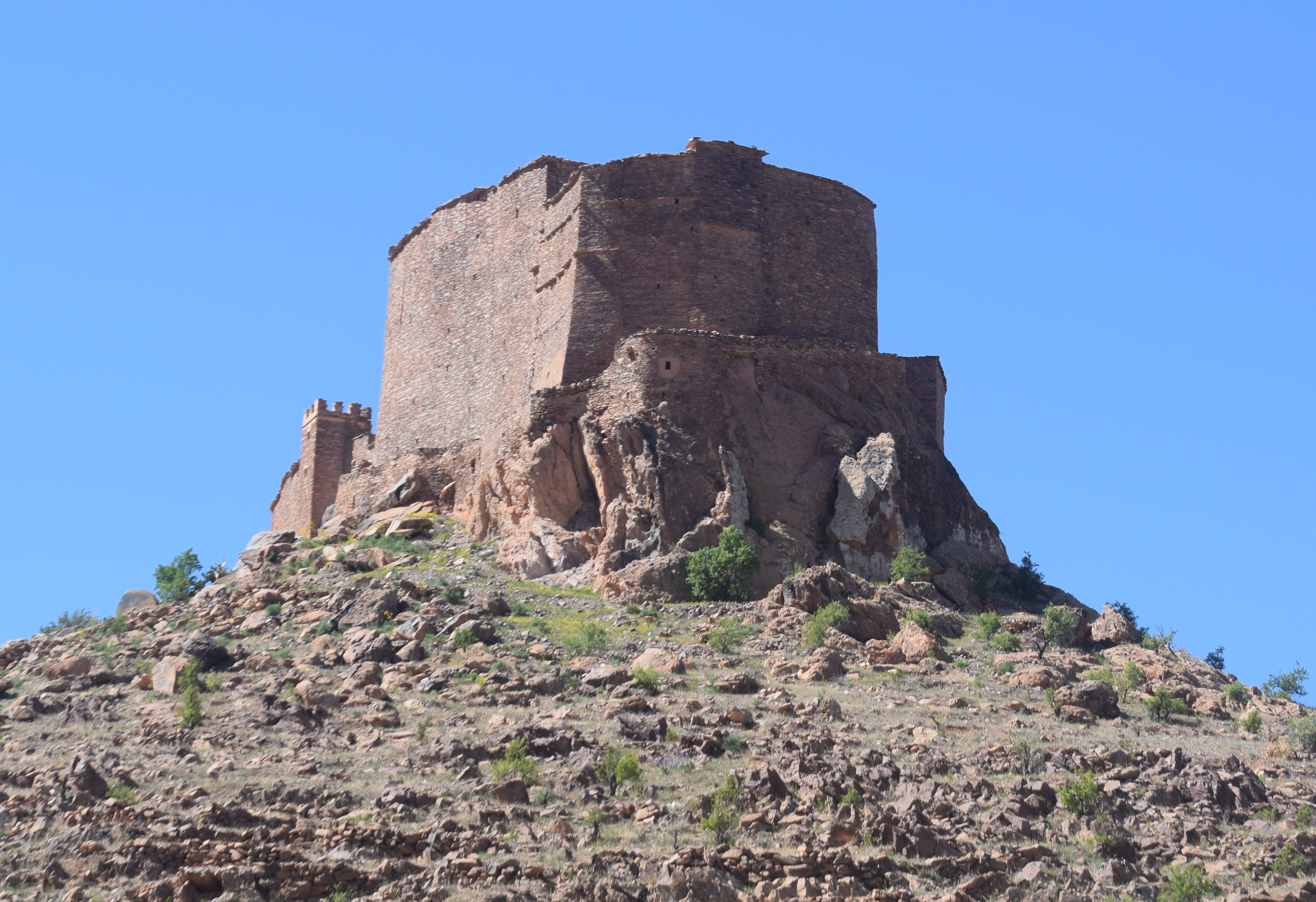
The Tasguent agadir

An agadir (Tachelhit: ⴰⴳⴰⴷⵉⵔ, plural: igudar or iguidar, "the wall" or "the fortified compound") is a fortified communal granary found in the Maghreb.

In Morocco, agadirs are most commonly found in the regions of the High Atlas, the Anti-Atlas mountains, and the Draa Valley. Some of them date back to the 10th century. Fortified granaries are also common in southern Tunisia, where they are referred to as a kasbah or, in the case of another type, as a ghorfa. In Algeria, they were once common in the Aurès Mountains, where they were known as a gal'a, but these were in the process of disappearing by the late 20th century.

== Name ==
The term agadir is Amazigh, borrowed from Phoenician: 𐤀𐤂𐤃𐤓, romanized: ʾgdr, meaning "wall", "compound", or (by metonymy) "stronghold". The word agadir is common in North African place names, such as Agadir, Morocco, and the cities Cádiz and Gedera are also etymologically related. The word al-Makhzen (المخزن), used to refer to the Moroccan state apparatus, also means storehouse, but in Arabic.

== Description ==
These structures are typically fortified granaries that also function as citadels, and are located in rocky, elevated locations to protect surrounding farms and livestock from enemies. In Morocco, they were typically built either of rammed earth or of dry stone masonry. Some of the large examples built in dry stone consist of multi-story structures laid out along narrow internal alleys. Each story is made up of a row of cell-like rooms, with upper rooms being accessible from the outside via protruding stones inserted into the facades. Rammed-earth constructions are more common in the High Atlas region, where the design of agadirs is more akin to that of the region's traditional houses, sometimes featuring exterior decoration executed in mudbrick. Multi-level structures are also known in southern Tunisia, where they are known as a ghorfa, though only a few have been preserved today. These consist of cell-like rooms stacked over each other up to four stories, with their entrances all facing an internal yard or court.

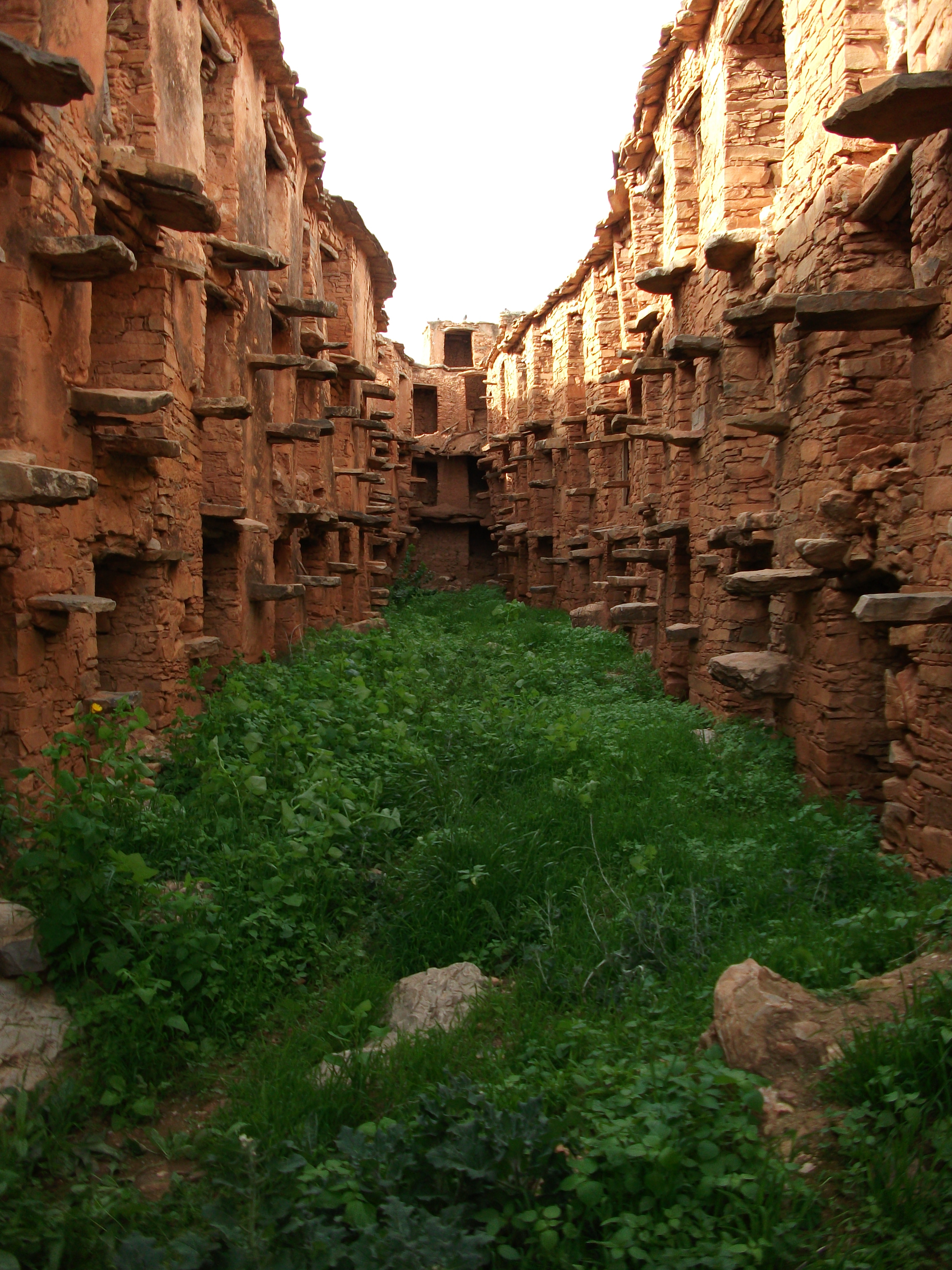
The Ikounka Agadir

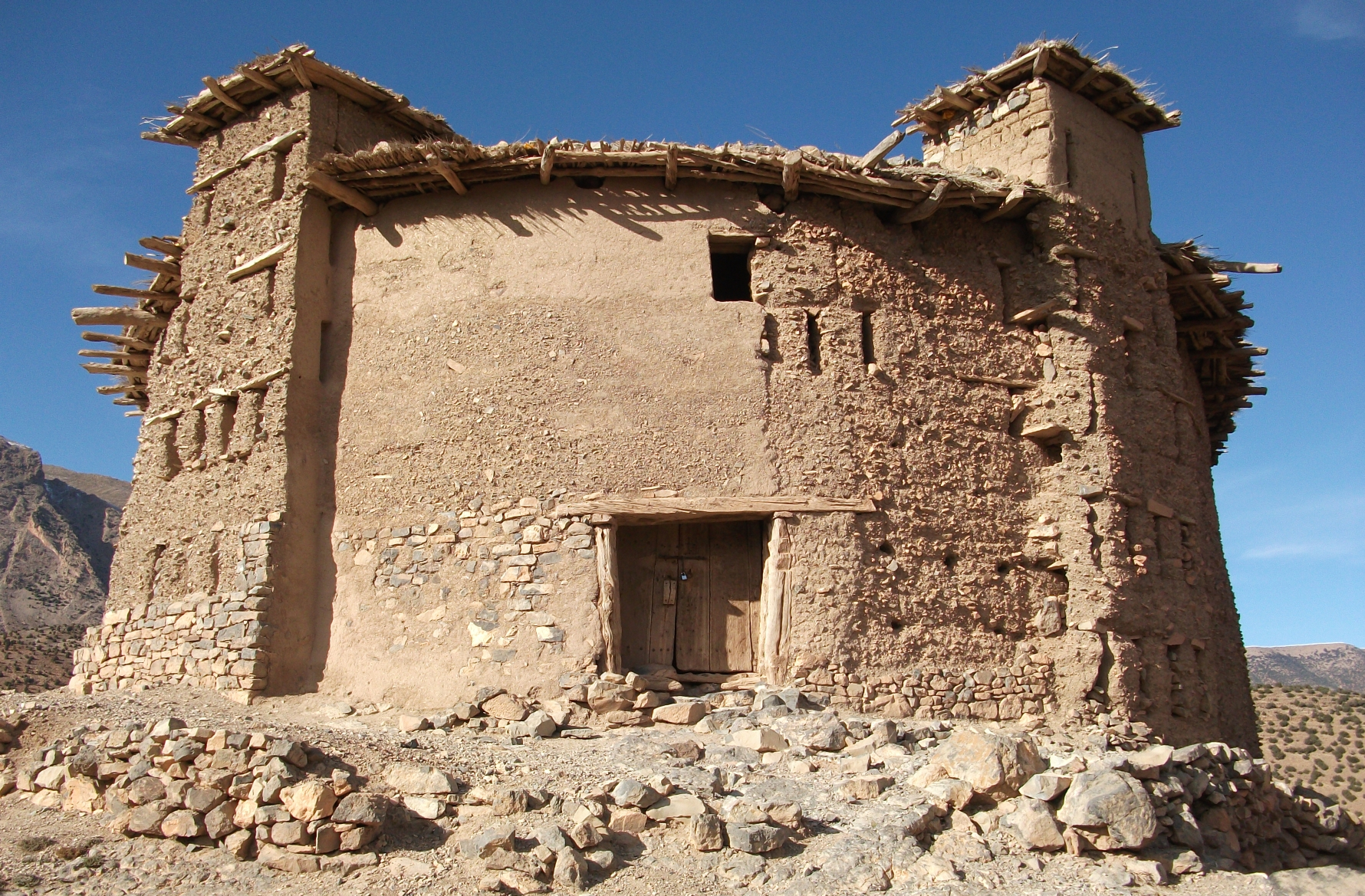
The Sidi Moussa Agadir of Aït Bouguemez, Morocco

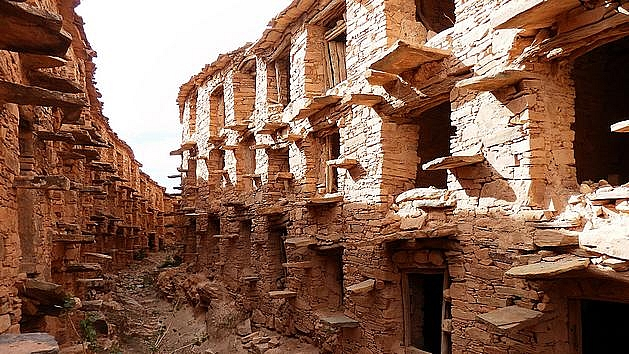
The Inoumar Agadir in the Souss-Massa region, Morocco

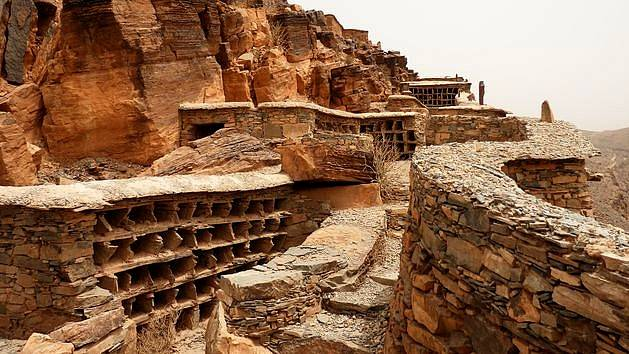
The Id Aissa Agadir near Amtoudi, Morocco

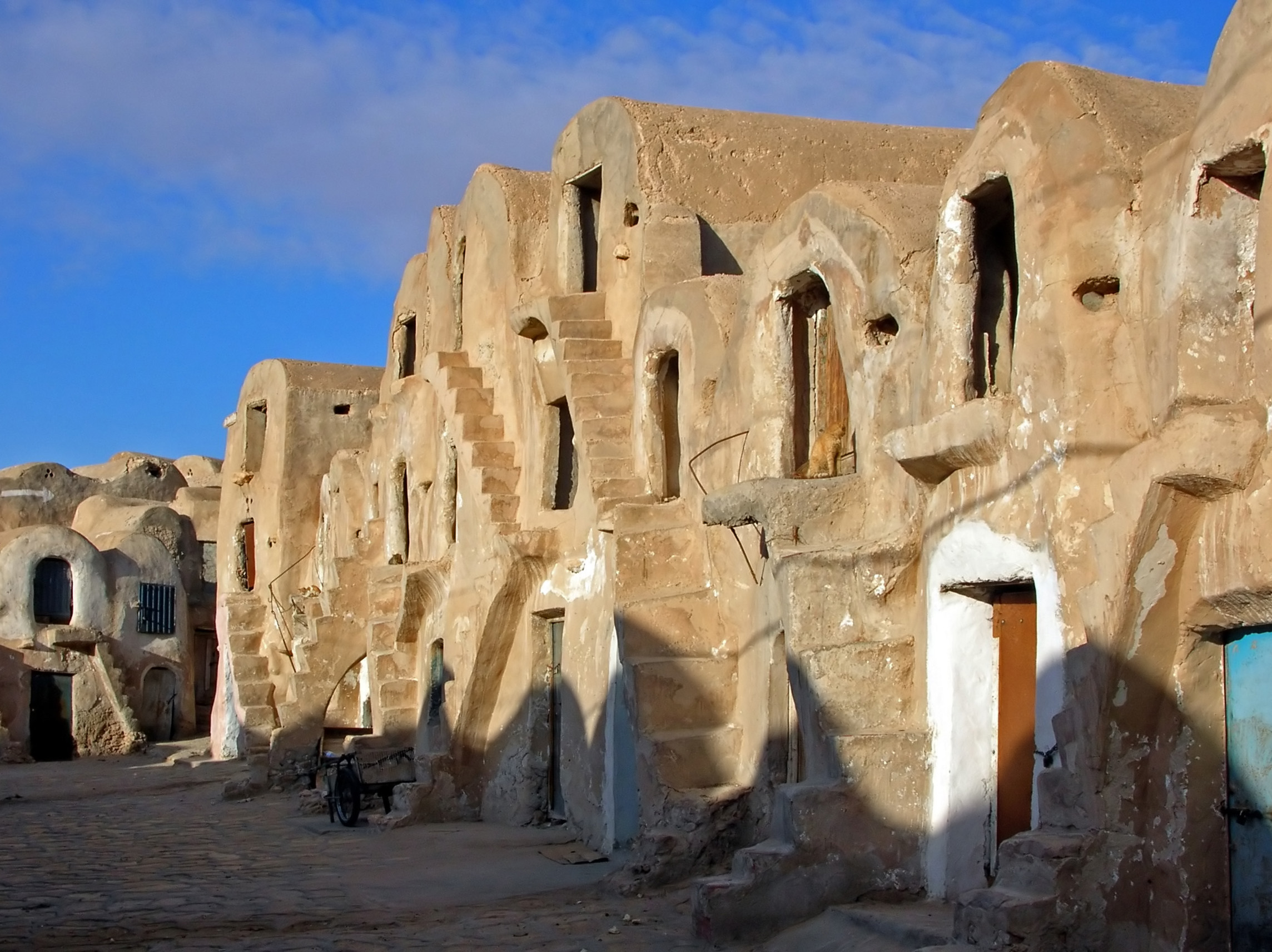
A ghorfa in Medenine, Tunisia

In addition to harvested grains, Amazigh communities inhabiting the mountainous south of Morocco would use these structures to store all kinds of valuable belongings, including deeds and records, money, jewelry, clothing, carpets, and sometimes clothes and munitions. Guards were traditionally posted to ensure security.

== See also ==
- Ksar
- Kasbah
