= Oum Lâalag =

Coordinates: 29.881751°N 6.119728°W

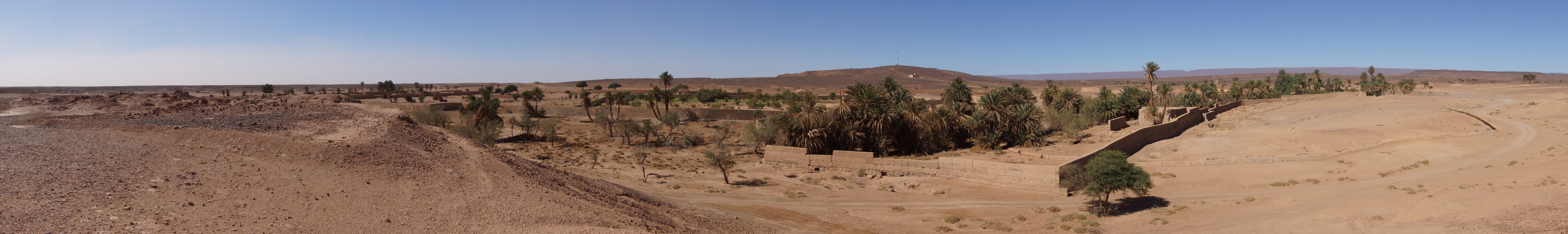
L’Oasis sacrée d’oum Lâalag

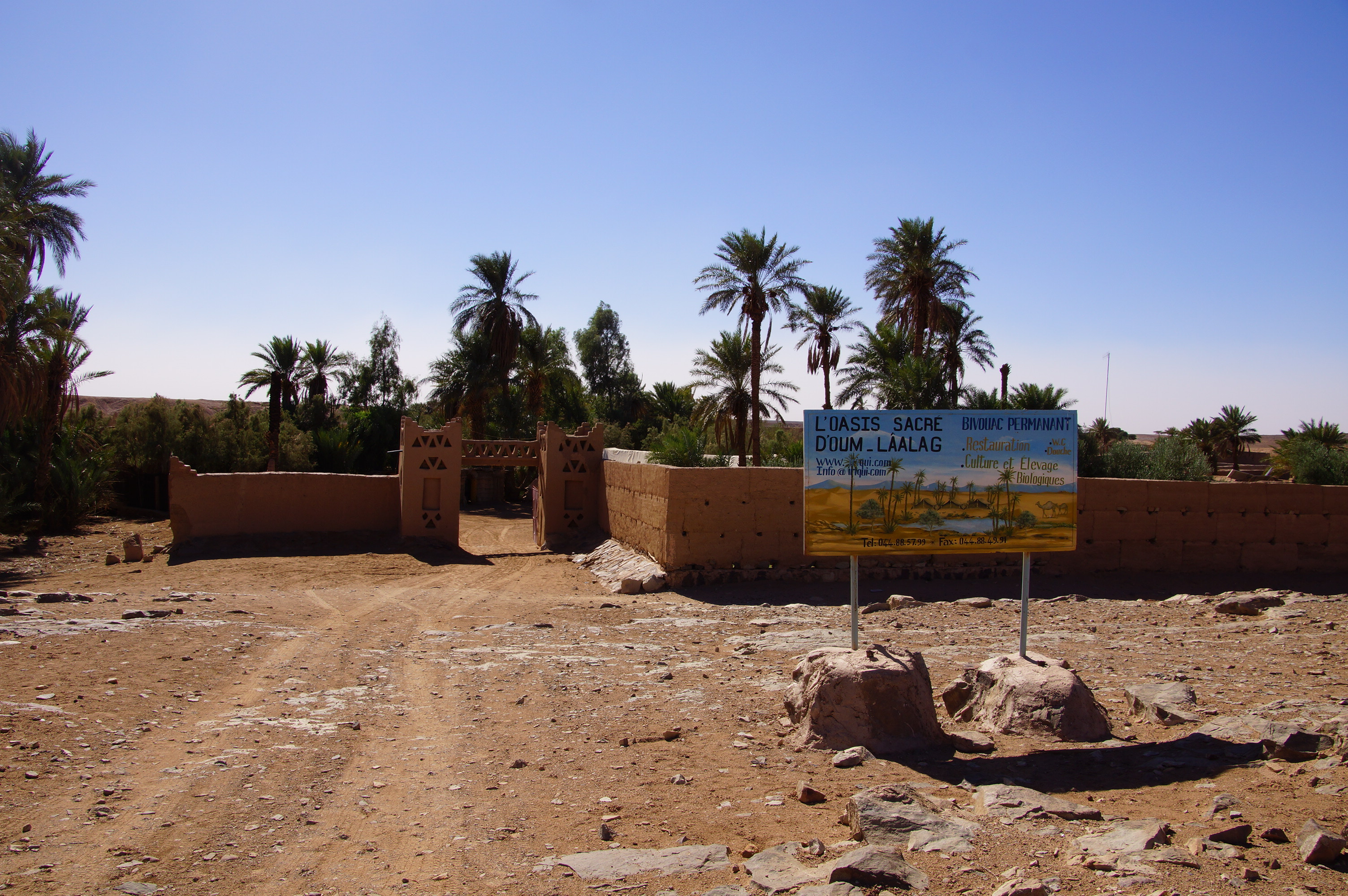
L’Oasis sacrée d’oum Lâalag

Oum Lâalag is an oasis located 50 kilometers southwest of M'Hamid El Ghizlane in Morocco at the old trans-Saharan trade route to Timbuktu, only a few kilometers from the border of Algeria.

The oasis is approximately 15 hectares in size and is presumed holy by the nomads. According to local beliefs, a fairy lives at its source. A bivouac camp site is available in the oasis, which offers ecologically sustainable tourism. The high dunes of Erg Chegaga can be reached by camel or 4x4 off-road vehicles.

The oasis is part of the 123,000-hectare Iriqui National Park, which was set up in 1994. In its vicinity live houbara bustards, ostriches, Barbary sheep, dorcas gazelles, oryxes and hyenas.
