= Tissint =

Tissint ⵜⵉⵙⵉⵏⵜ تيسينت
- Interactive map of Tissint
- Coordinates: 29°54′02″N 7°19′13″W
- Country: Morocco
- Region: Souss-Massa
- Province: Tata Province

Population (2004)
  - Total: 9,927
- Time zone: UTC+0 (GMT)
- Postal code: 84053

Tissint (Berber languages: ⵜⵉⵙⵉⵏⵜ, Arabic: تيسينت, also known as Agadir Tissinnt, Agadir Tissint, or Tissinnt) is a small town near Tata, Morocco in Tata Province in the Souss-Massa region of Morocco. It has a population of 9,927 as of 2004.

Tissint was the site of a meteorite fall on July 18, 2011. In October 2011, nomads began to find very fresh, fusion-crusted stones in a remote area of the Oued Drâa intermittent watershed, centered about 50 km ESE of Tata, Morocco and 48 km SSW of Tissint, near the Oued El Gsaïb drainage and also near El Ga’ïdat plateau known as Hmadat Boû Rba’ine. The largest pieces were recovered in the El Ga’ïdat plateau, and the smallest ones (a few grams) were found closer to the El Aglâb mountains. One 47 g crusted stone was documented as found at 29°28.917’ N, 7°36.674’ W.
