= Amtoudi =

Coordinates: 29°14′34″N 9°11′12″W

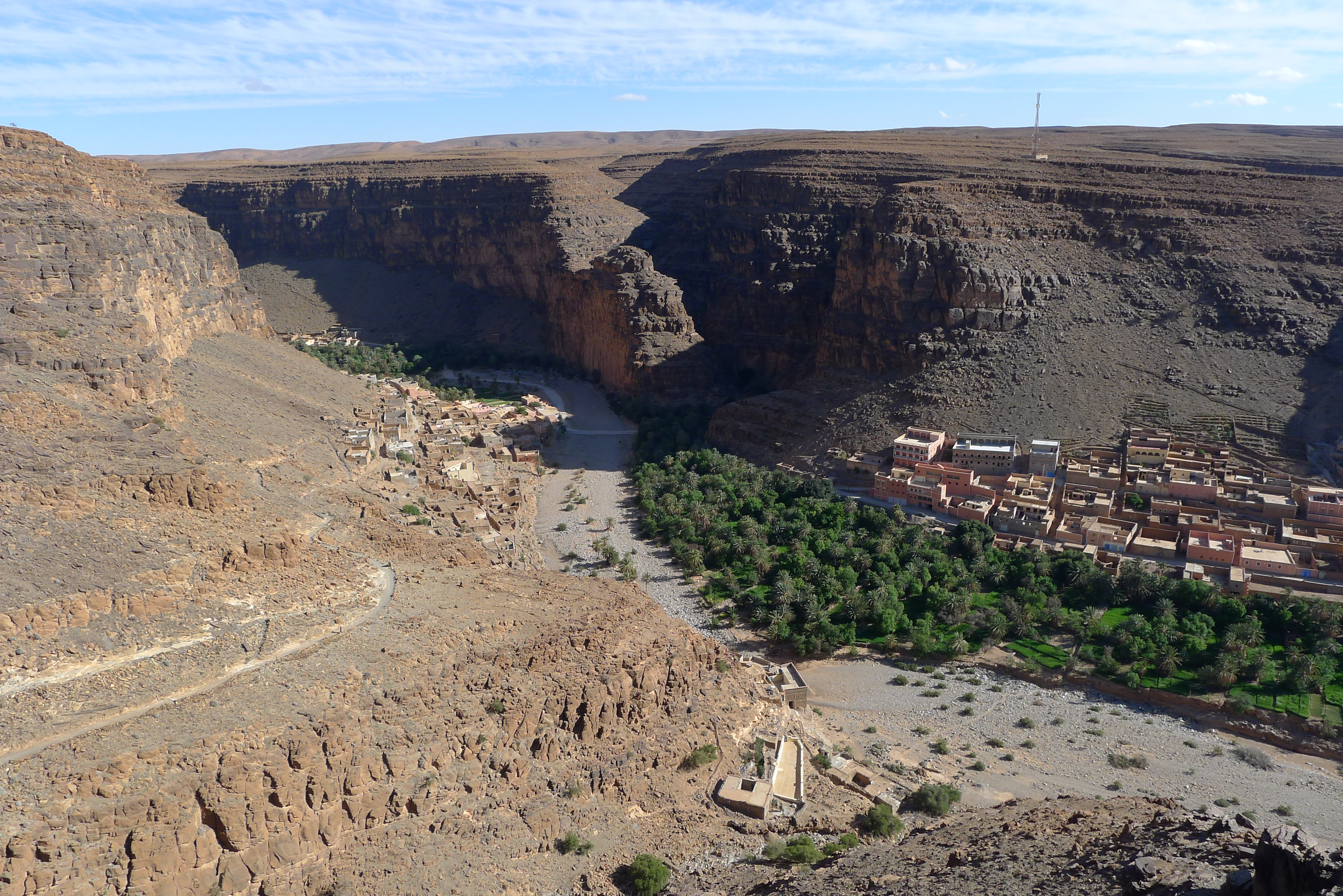
Amtoudi in 2013

Amtoudi is a Berber village of 1,000 people in the Anti-Atlas region of Morocco. Amtoudi is 235 km southeast of the city of Agadir. It is in Guelmim Province in the Guelmim-Oued Noun region.
