= Fam El Hisn =

Coordinates: 29°01′08″N 8°53′28″W

Fam El Hisn فم الحصن ⵉⵎⵉ ⵏ ⵓⴳⴰⴷⵉⵔ Imi-n-Ugadir
- Town
- Interactive map of Fam El Hisn
- Country: Morocco
- Region: Souss-Massa
- Province: Tata Province

Population (2004)
  - Total: 7,089
- Time zone: UTC+0 (GMT)

Fam El Hisn (Shilha: ⵉⵎⵉ ⵏ ⵓⴳⴰⴷⵉⵔ, romanized: imi n ugadir) is a town in Tata Province, Souss-Massa, Morocco. According to a 2004 census, it had a population of 7,089.
