= Tata Province =

Province of Morocco

Coordinates: 29°44′34″N 7°58′21″W

Tata Province إقليم طاطا ⵜⴰⵙⴳⴰ ⵏ ⵟⴰⵟⴰ
- Province
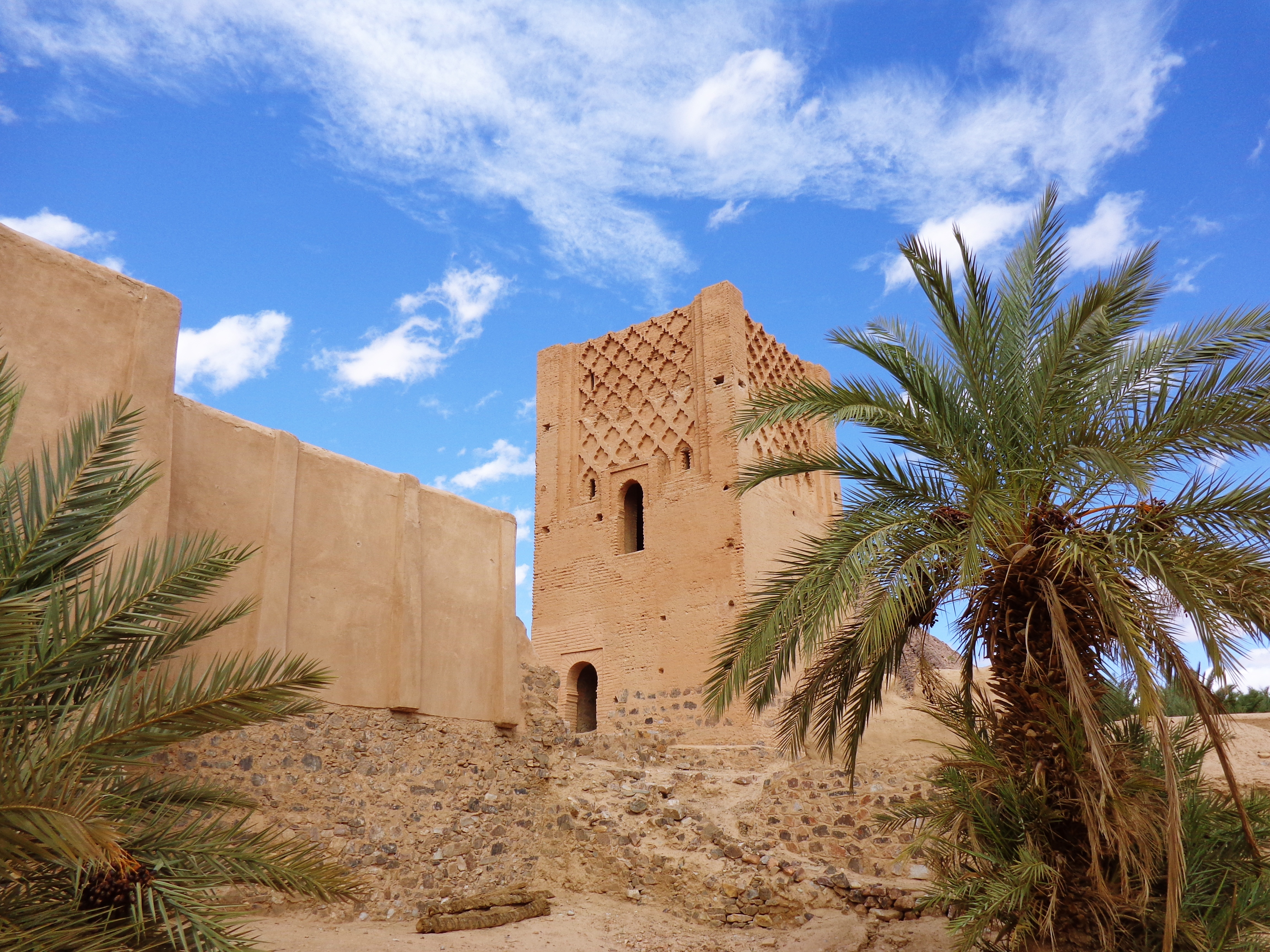
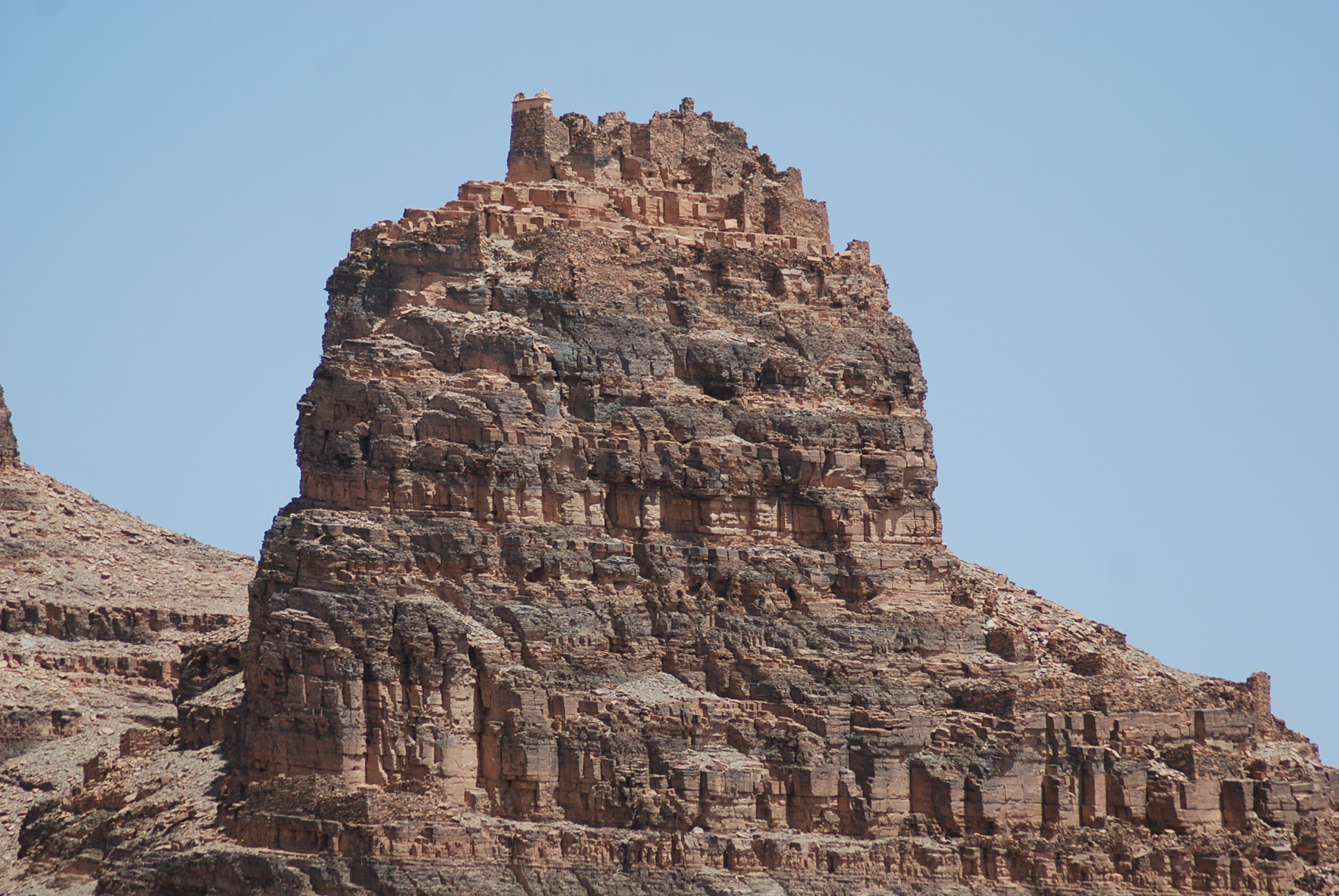
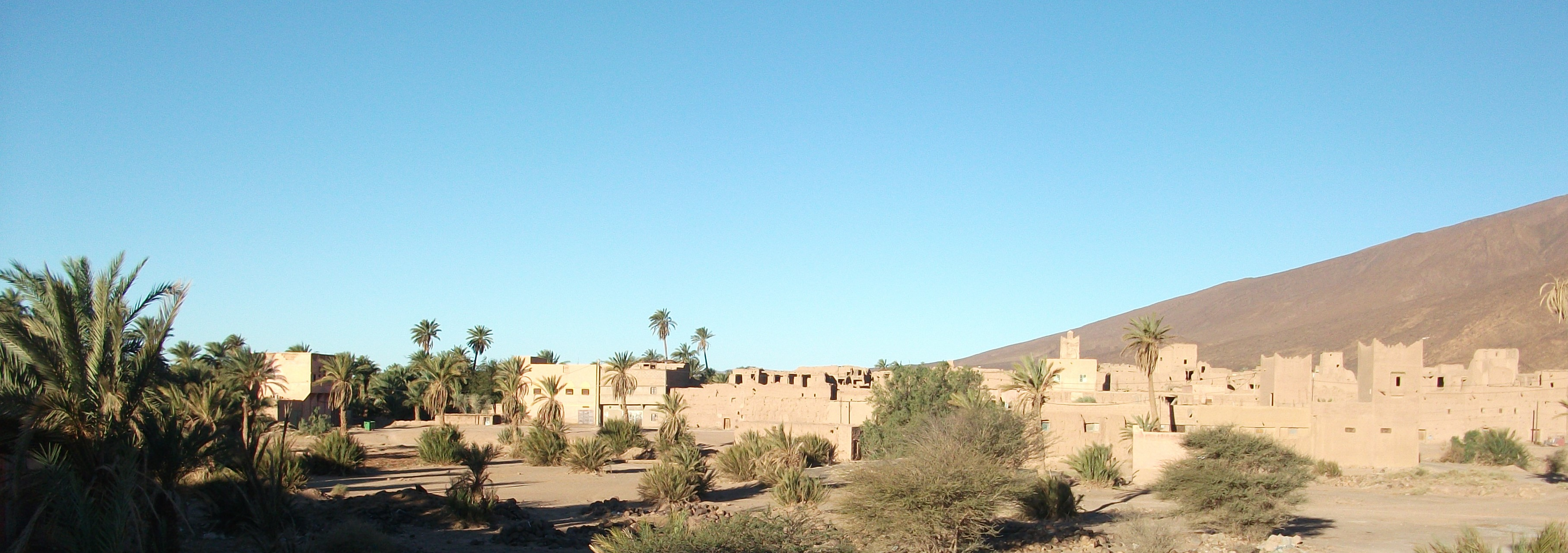
- Akka Igoudar fortress Foum Zguid
- Interactive map of Tata Province
- Country: Morocco
- Region: Souss-Massa
- Seat: Tata

Population (2024)
  - Total: 111,757

Tata (Arabic: طاطا, Standard Moroccan Tamazight: ⵟⴰⵟⴰ) is a province in the Moroccan economic region of Souss-Massa. Its population as of the 2024 census was 111,757.

The major cities and towns are:

- Akka
- Fam El Hisn
- Foum Zguid
- Tata

== Subdivisions ==
The province is divided administratively into the following:

Name	Geographic code	Type	Households	Population (2004)	Foreign population	Moroccan population	Notes
Akka	551.01.01.	Municipality	1097	7102	2	7100	
Fam El Hisn	551.01.03.	Municipality	1183	7089	1	7088	
Foum Zguid	551.01.05.	Municipality	1513	9630	1	9629	
Tata	551.01.07.	Municipality	2840	15239	13	15226	
Ait Ouabelli	551.03.01.	Rural commune	463	2776	1	2775	
Kasbat Sidi Abdellah Ben M'Barek	551.03.03.	Rural commune	1116	7012	0	7012	
Tamanarte	551.03.05.	Rural commune	1516	7217	0	7217	
Tizounine	551.03.07.	Rural commune	412	2231	1	2230	
Aguinane	551.05.01.	Rural commune	489	2923	0	2923	
Akka Ighane	551.05.03.	Rural commune	1095	6725	2	6723	
Allougoum	551.05.05.	Rural commune	1028	8490	0	8490	
Ibn Yacoub	551.05.07.	Rural commune	497	2934	0	2934	
Tissint	551.05.09.	Rural commune	1293	9927	0	9927	
Tlite	551.05.11.	Rural commune	738	5066	0	5066	
Adis	551.07.01.	Rural commune	852	5916	0	5916	
Issafen	551.07.03.	Rural commune	966	4002	0	4002	
Oum El Guerdane	551.07.05.	Rural commune	496	3988	1	3987	
Tagmout	551.07.07.	Rural commune	1036	4751	0	4751	
Tigzmerte	551.07.09.	Rural commune	753	4110	0	4110	
Tizaghte	551.07.11.	Rural commune	966	4490	0	4490	
