= Bouizakarne =

Bouizakarne ⴱⵓⵢⵣⴰⴽⴰⵔⵏ
- Town
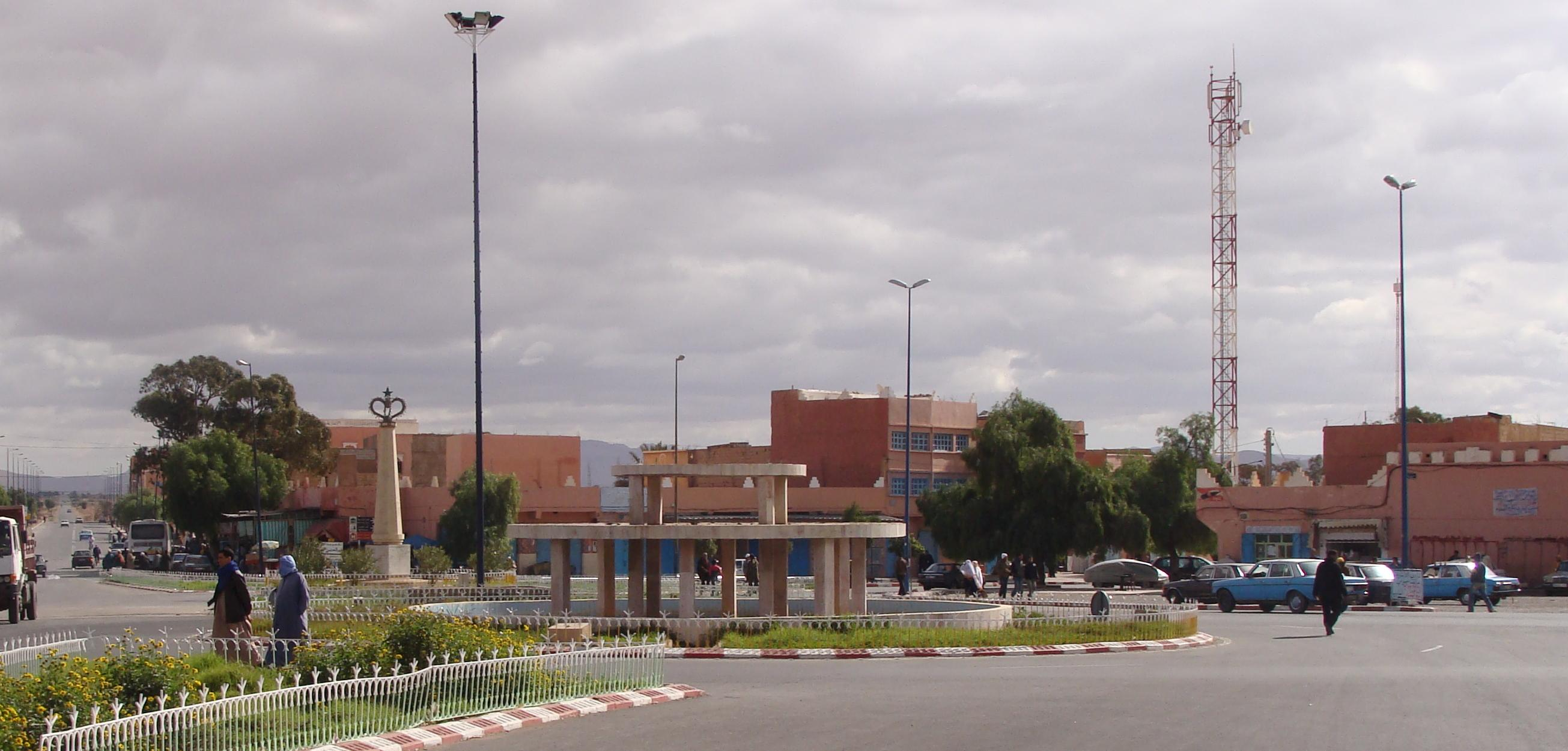
- City Center of Bouizakarne
- Interactive map of Bouizakarne
- Country: Morocco
- Region: Guelmim-Oued Noun
- Province: Guelmim
- Elevation: 623 m (2,044 ft)

Population (2014)
  - Total: 14,228
- Time zone: UTC+0 (GMT)
- Postal code: 81050

Bouizakarne (Tashelhit: ⴱⵓⵢⵣⴰⴽⴰⵔⵏ, Arabic: بو يزكارن) is a town in the Guelmim Province, Guelmim-Oued Noun, in southern Morocco. In the 2014 census, it had a population of 14,228, the fifth-largest in the region and second-highest in the province after the regional capital Guelmim.

The city name is composed of two Berber (Tashelhit) words, bou/bu/ⴱⵓ, meaning 'owner of', and izakarne/izakarn/ⵉⵣⴰⴽⴰⵔⵏ, plural of izikr/ⵉⵣⵉⴽⵔ, meaning 'cord'.

The town's surrounding Anti-Atlas mountains are covered with argan trees.

== Notable people ==
- Driss Benzekri – former international goalkeeper
