= Akka, Morocco =

Akka, Morocco أقا / ⴰⵇⵇⴰ
- Town
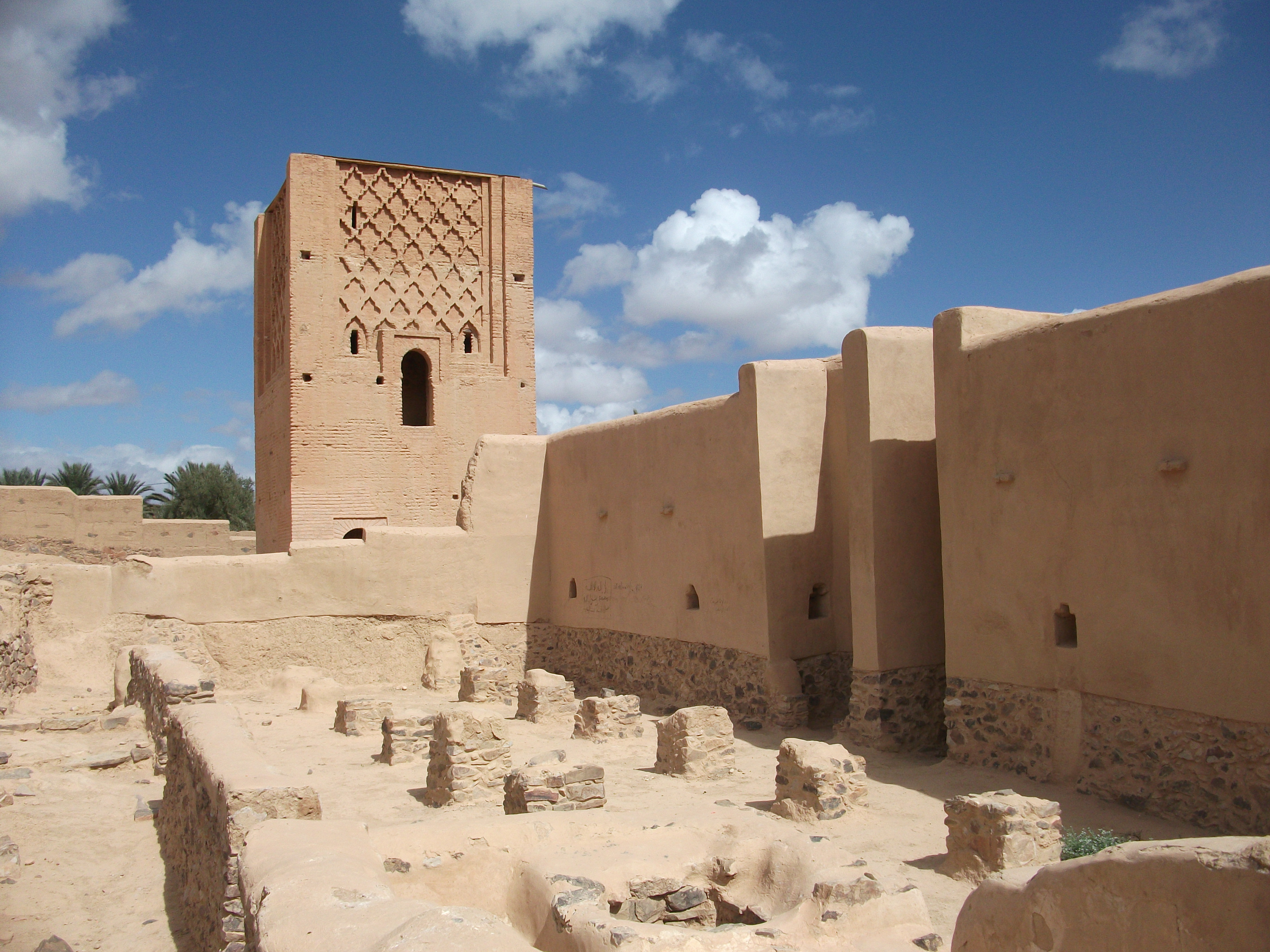
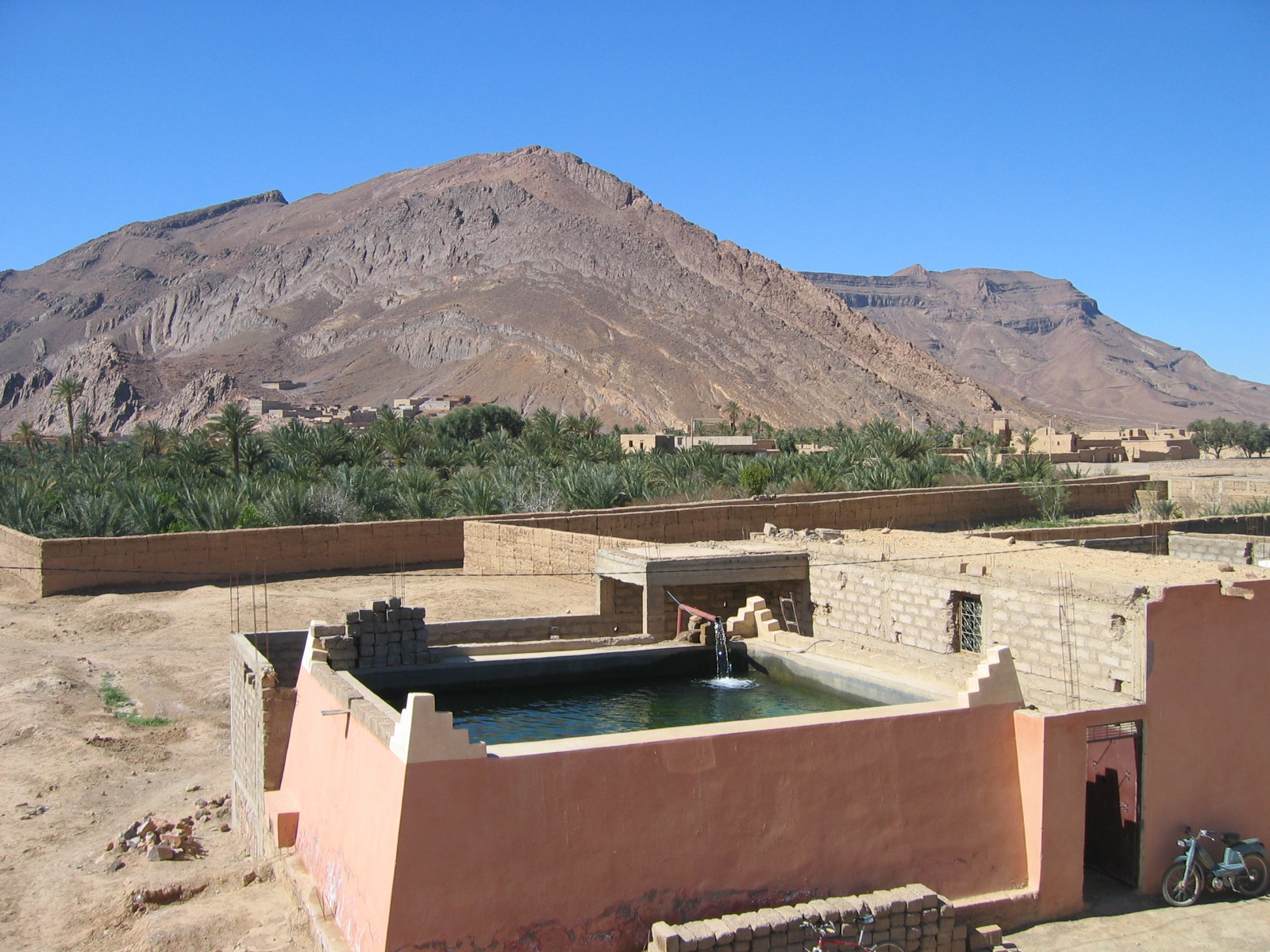
- Interactive map of Akka, Morocco
- Coordinates: 29°23′27″N 8°15′23″W
- Country: Morocco
- Region: Souss-Massa
- Province: Tata
- Elevation: 670 m (2,200 ft)

Population (2004)
  - Total: 7,102
- Time zone: UTC+0 (GMT)

Akka (Berber languages: ⴰⵇⵇⴰ, Arabic: أقّا, romanized: aqqa) is a town in Tata Province, Souss-Massa, Morocco. According to the 2004 census it had a population of 7,102. It contains old buildings such as the Mohaddin (locally known as Lalla Baitollah) building in Kasabat-sidi Abdellah Ben M'Bark.

Akka may be the same as Vakka where, according to some traditions, the first Jews who migrated to Morocco settled. The city name means Dates in Tamazight.
