= Guelmim Province =

Coordinates: 28°59′N 10°04′W

Guelmim Province إقليم كلميم ⵜⴰⵙⴳⴰ ⵏ ⵓⴳⵯⵍⵎⵉⵎ
- Province
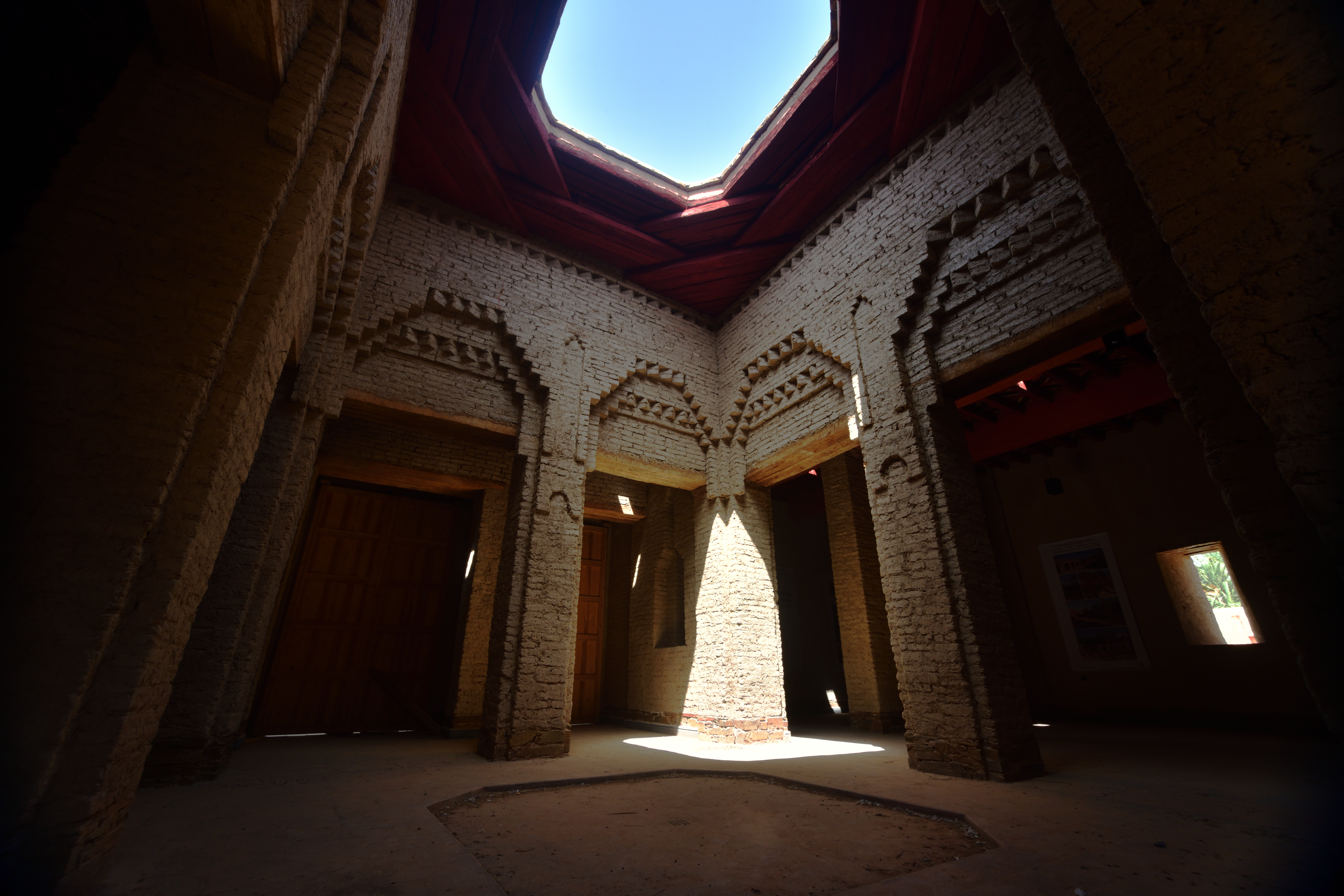
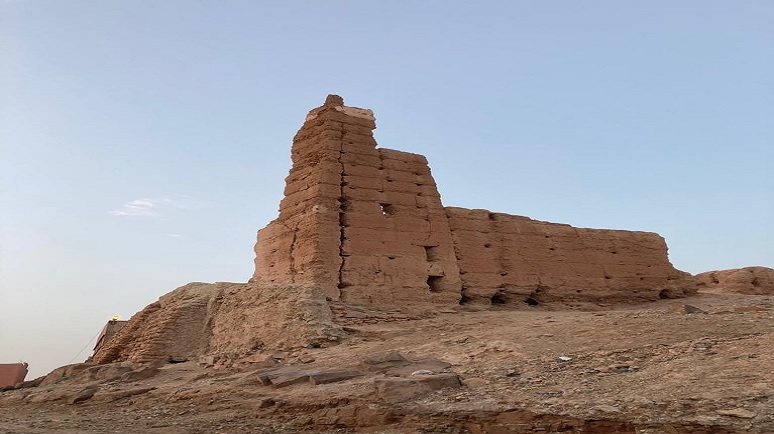
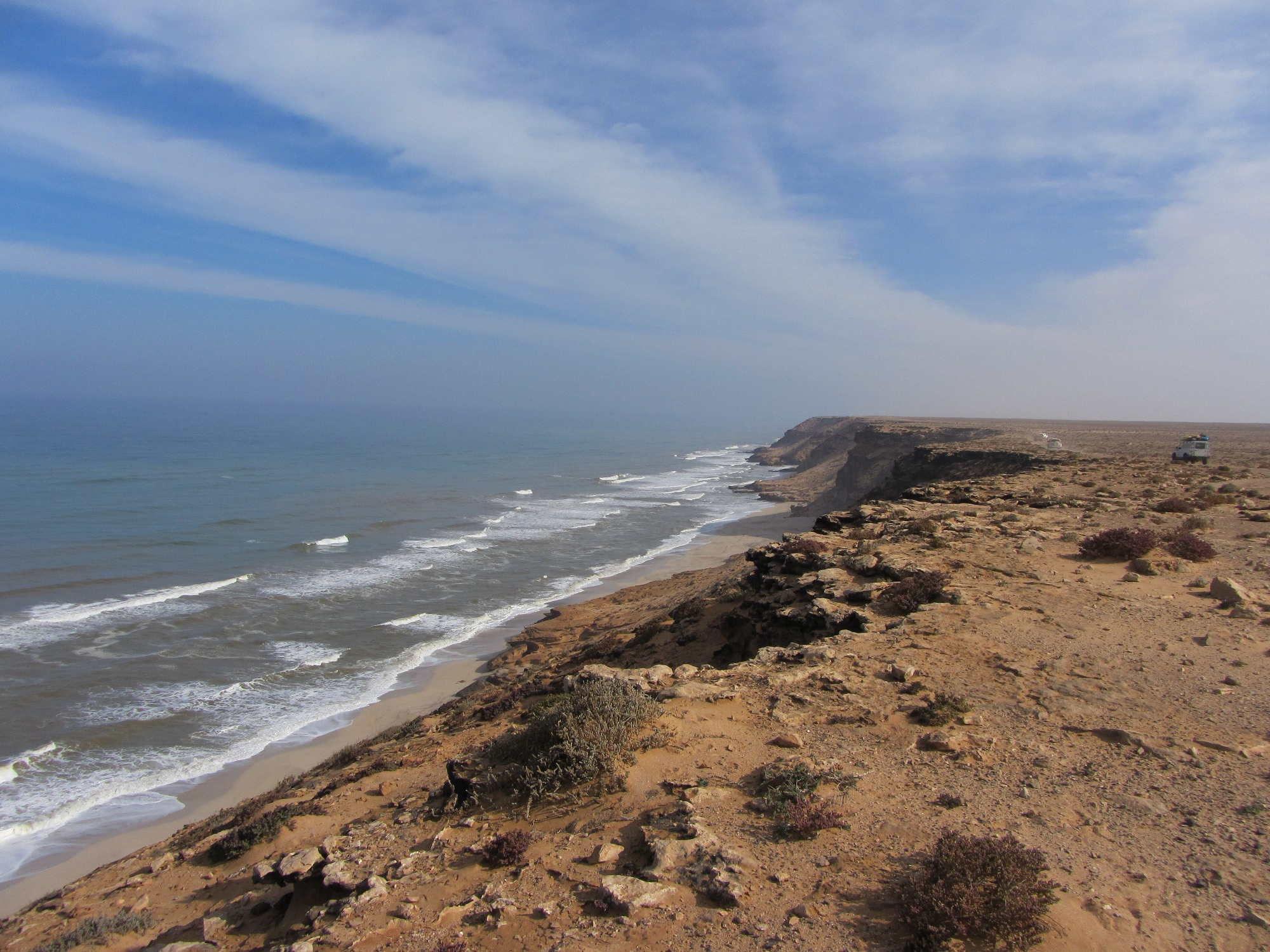
- The historic market of Tiblaba, Taghjijt Remains of the old Almoravid mint, Asrir Cape Draa, Rass Oumlil
- Interactive map of Guelmim Province
- Country: Morocco
- Region: Guelmim-Oued Noun
- Seat: Guelmim

Population (2024)
  - Total: 196,267

Guelmim (Arabic: كلميم; Standard Moroccan Tamazight: ⴰⴳⵯⵍⵎⵉⵎ) is a province in the Moroccan economic region of Guelmim-Oued Noun. Its population in 2024 was 196,267.

The major cities and towns are:

- Bouizakarne
- Guelmim
- Taghjijt
- Ifrane Atlas Saghir

== Subdivisions ==
Communes of Guelmim Province

The province is divided administratively into the following:

=== Municipalities ===
Name	Geographic code	Households (2024)	Population (2024)
Bouizakarne	261.01.01.	4113	18036
Guelmim	261.01.03.	30343	126729

=== Rural communes ===
Name	Geographic code	Households (2024)	Population (2024)	Notes
Abaynou	261.07.01.	722	3038	
Aday	261.03.01.	783	2828	
Aferkat	261.05.03.	221	978	
Ait Boufoulen	261.03.03.	222	941	
Amtdi	261.03.05.	298	1137	
Asrir	261.05.05.	759	3217	
Echatea El Abied	261.07.07.	213	928	
Fask	261.05.09.	862	3511	
Ifrane Atlas-Saghir	261.03.07.	2639	10375	Urban centre: Ifrane Atlas Saghir (1,805 inhabitants; 479 households)
Labyar	261.07.11.	121	433	
Laqsabi Tagoust	261.07.13.	663	2592	
Rass Oumlil	261.07.15.	239	839	
Tagante	261.03.09.	980	4455	
Taghjijt	261.03.11.	2332	9059	Urban centre: Taghjijt (6,668 inhabitants; 1,734 households)
Taliouine Assaka	261.07.17.	245	865	
Targa Wassay	261.07.19.	161	635	
Tiglit	261.05.21.	137	798	
Timoulay	261.03.13.	1197	4873	
