= Guelmim =

City in Guelmim-Oued Noun, Morocco

Guelmim: كلميم (Arabic); ⴰⴳⵯⵍⵎⵉⵎ (Berber languages)
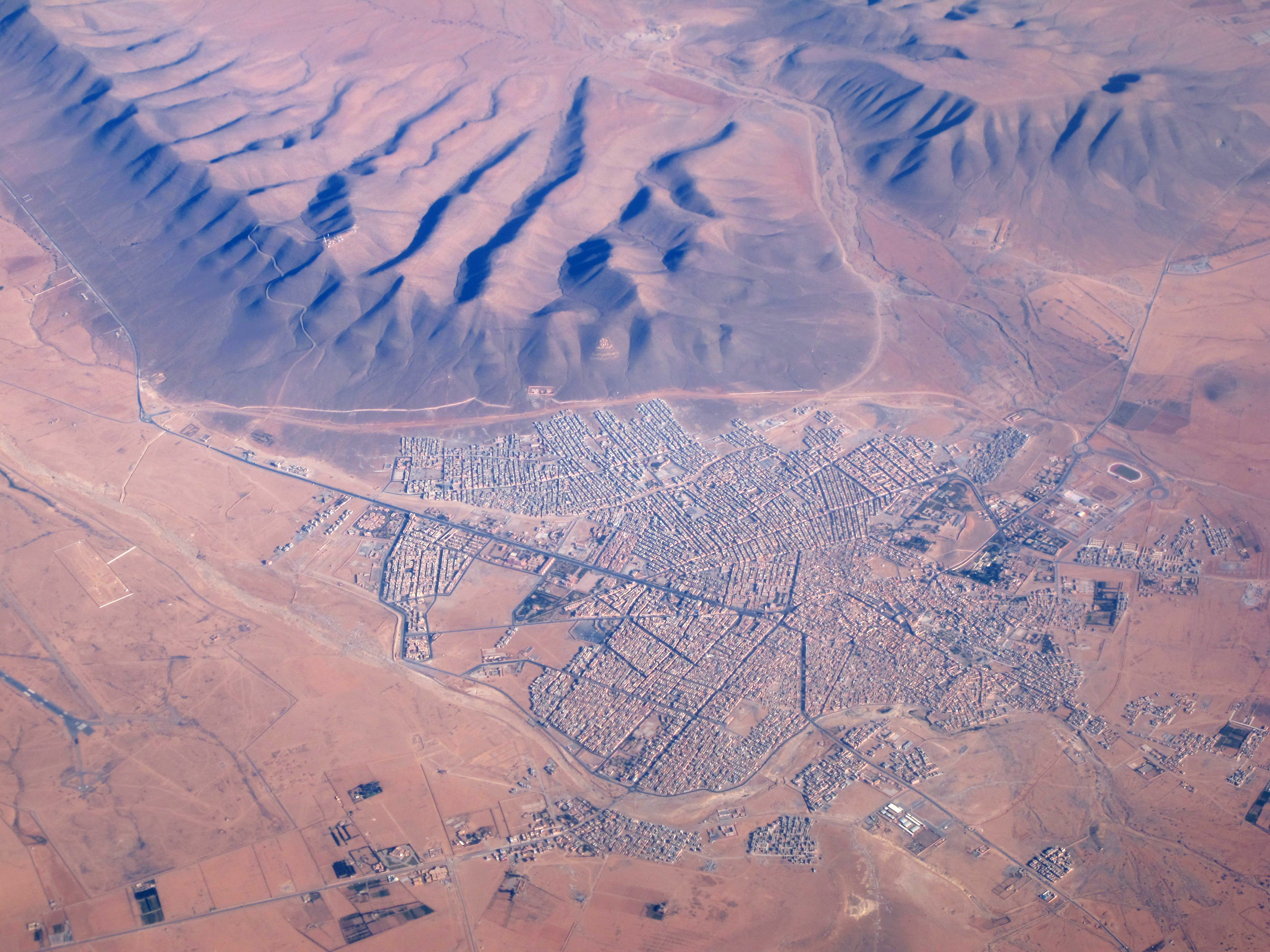
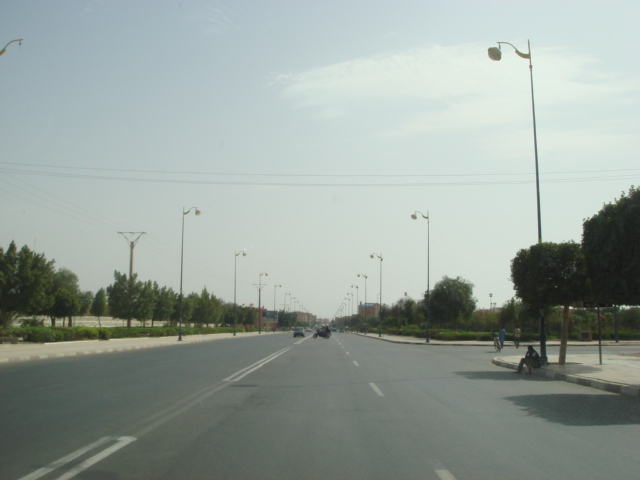
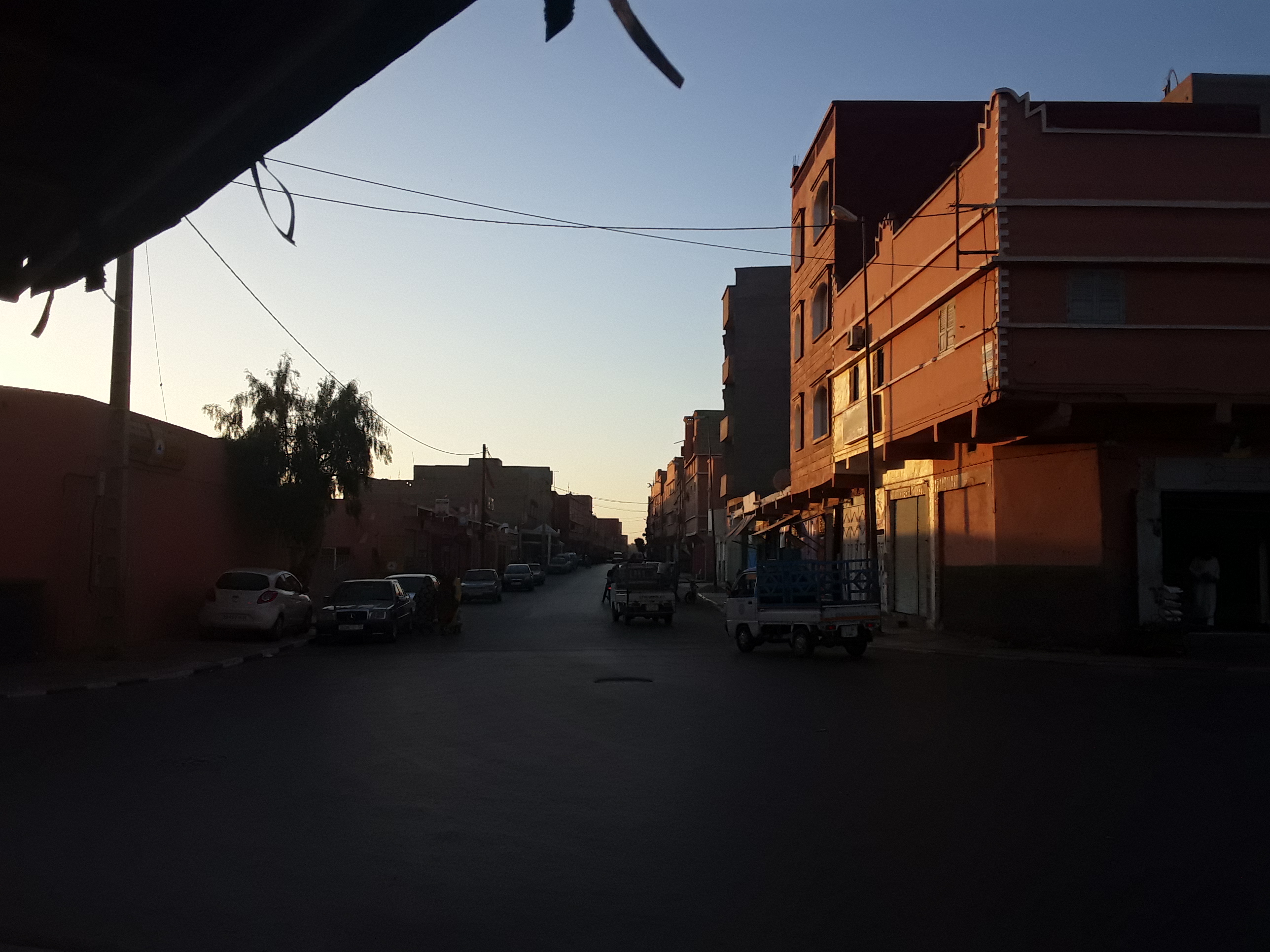
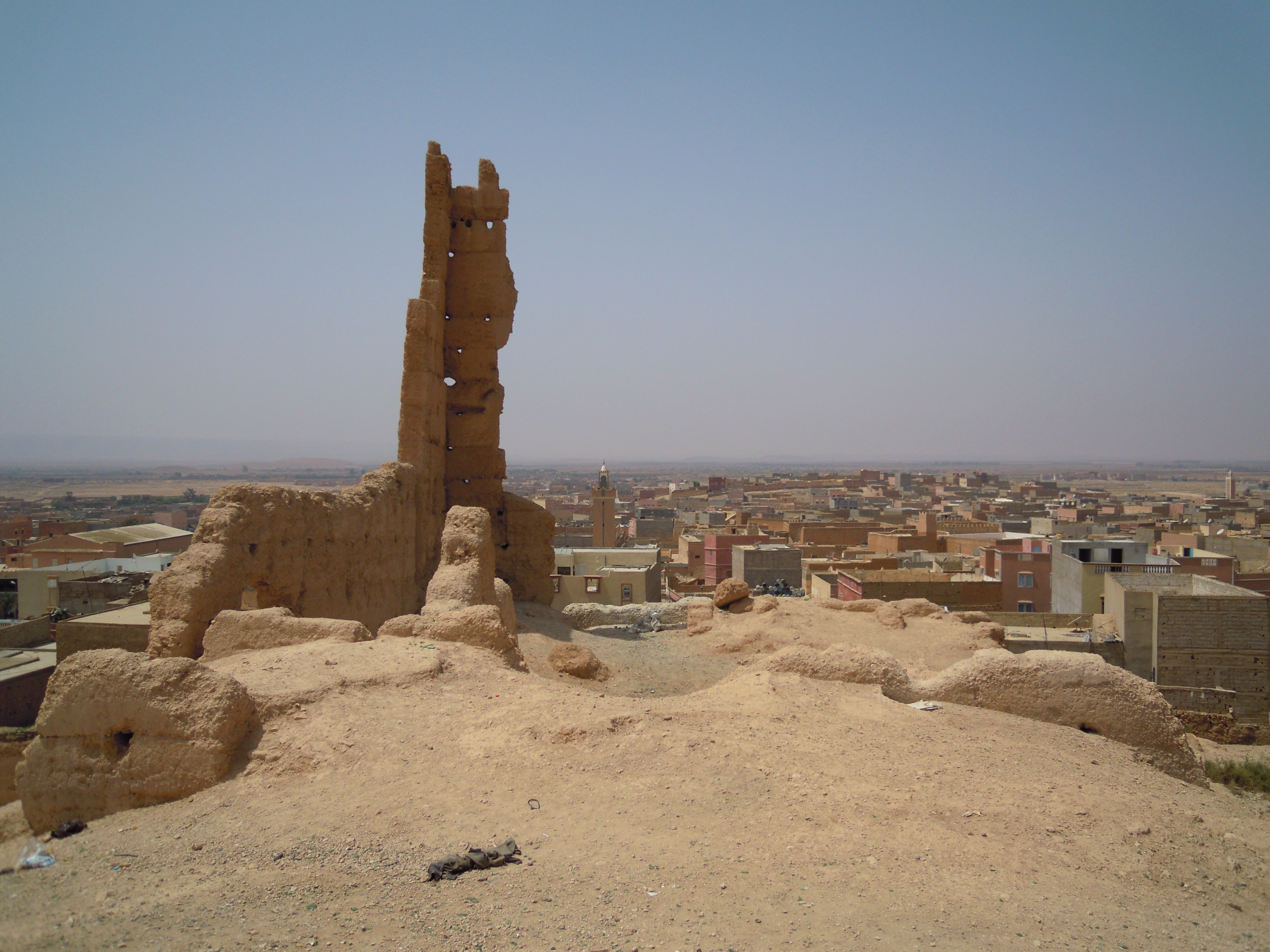
- Nickname: The Gateway to the Desert
- Interactive map of Guelmim
- Coordinates: 28°59′N 10°04′W
- Country: Morocco
- Region: Guelmim-Oued Noun
- Province: Guelmim

Population (2014)
  - Total: 118,318
- Time zone: UTC+0 (GMT)

Guelmim (Note: Arabic: كلميم, romanized: kulmīm; Berber languages: ⴳⵓⵍⵎⵉⵎ, romanized: gulmim; also spelled in European sources: Glaimim, Goulimine or Guelmin) is a city in southern Morocco, often called the Gateway to the Desert. It is the capital of the Guelmim-Oued Noun region which includes southern Morocco (south of the Souss-Massa region) and the northeastern corner of Western Sahara. The population of the city was 187,808 as of the 2014 Moroccan census, making it the largest city in the region. The N1 and N12 highways cross at Guelmim and link it to the nearby region of Souss-Massa.

Guelmim is located just north of Asrir, which was the site of an important trade-route city and the capital of the Saharan Berber tribes. It is home to a camel market. Most of the inhabitants speak either the Tachelhit Berber language or the Hassaniya dialect of Arabic.

== Climate ==
Guelmim has a hot desert climate (Köppen climate classification BWh).

Climate data for Guelmim (1991–2020)
| Month | Jan | Feb | Mar | Apr | May | Jun | Jul | Aug | Sep | Oct | Nov | Dec | Year |
|---|---|---|---|---|---|---|---|---|---|---|---|---|---|
| Record high °C (°F) | 30.4 (86.7) | 32.2 (90.0) | 37.2 (99.0) | 38.8 (101.8) | 44.2 (111.6) | 46.3 (115.3) | 47.6 (117.7) | 47.0 (116.6) | 44.5 (112.1) | 42.6 (108.7) | 35.3 (95.5) | 30.0 (86.0) | 47.6 (117.7) |
| Mean daily maximum °C (°F) | 20.9 (69.6) | 22.4 (72.3) | 24.9 (76.8) | 25.4 (77.7) | 27.0 (80.6) | 29.2 (84.6) | 32.9 (91.2) | 34.1 (93.4) | 31.3 (88.3) | 29.1 (84.4) | 24.9 (76.8) | 21.8 (71.2) | 27.0 (80.6) |
| Daily mean °C (°F) | 14.7 (58.5) | 16.1 (61.0) | 18.4 (65.1) | 19.2 (66.6) | 20.9 (69.6) | 22.9 (73.2) | 25.5 (77.9) | 26.5 (79.7) | 24.3 (75.7) | 22.5 (72.5) | 18.7 (65.7) | 16.0 (60.8) | 20.5 (68.9) |
| Mean daily minimum °C (°F) | 8.5 (47.3) | 9.8 (49.6) | 11.7 (53.1) | 13.0 (55.4) | 14.7 (58.5) | 16.5 (61.7) | 18.1 (64.6) | 18.9 (66.0) | 17.4 (63.3) | 15.9 (60.6) | 12.4 (54.3) | 10.0 (50.0) | 13.9 (57.0) |
| Record low °C (°F) | 0.7 (33.3) | 1.3 (34.3) | 4.0 (39.2) | 6.0 (42.8) | 7.4 (45.3) | 10.2 (50.4) | 13.4 (56.1) | 13.2 (55.8) | 9.2 (48.6) | 7.2 (45.0) | 3.0 (37.4) | 1.6 (34.9) | 0.7 (33.3) |
| Average precipitation mm (inches) | 13.4 (0.53) | 16.6 (0.65) | 16.8 (0.66) | 5.5 (0.22) | 2.8 (0.11) | 0.6 (0.02) | 0.1 (0.00) | 2.9 (0.11) | 5.2 (0.20) | 11.6 (0.46) | 22.2 (0.87) | 21.2 (0.83) | 118.9 (4.68) |
| Average precipitation days (≥ 1.0 mm) | 2.5 | 2.8 | 2.6 | 1.2 | 0.4 | 0.2 | 0.0 | 0.6 | 0.5 | 1.6 | 2.5 | 3.1 | 18.0 |
Source: NOAA

== Notable people ==
- Brahim Takioullah, second-tallest living person

== See also ==
- Beni Ḥassān
- Noun River
- Maqil
- Tekna
- Shilha people
