= Tata, Morocco =

Tata ⵟⴰⵟⴰ طاطا
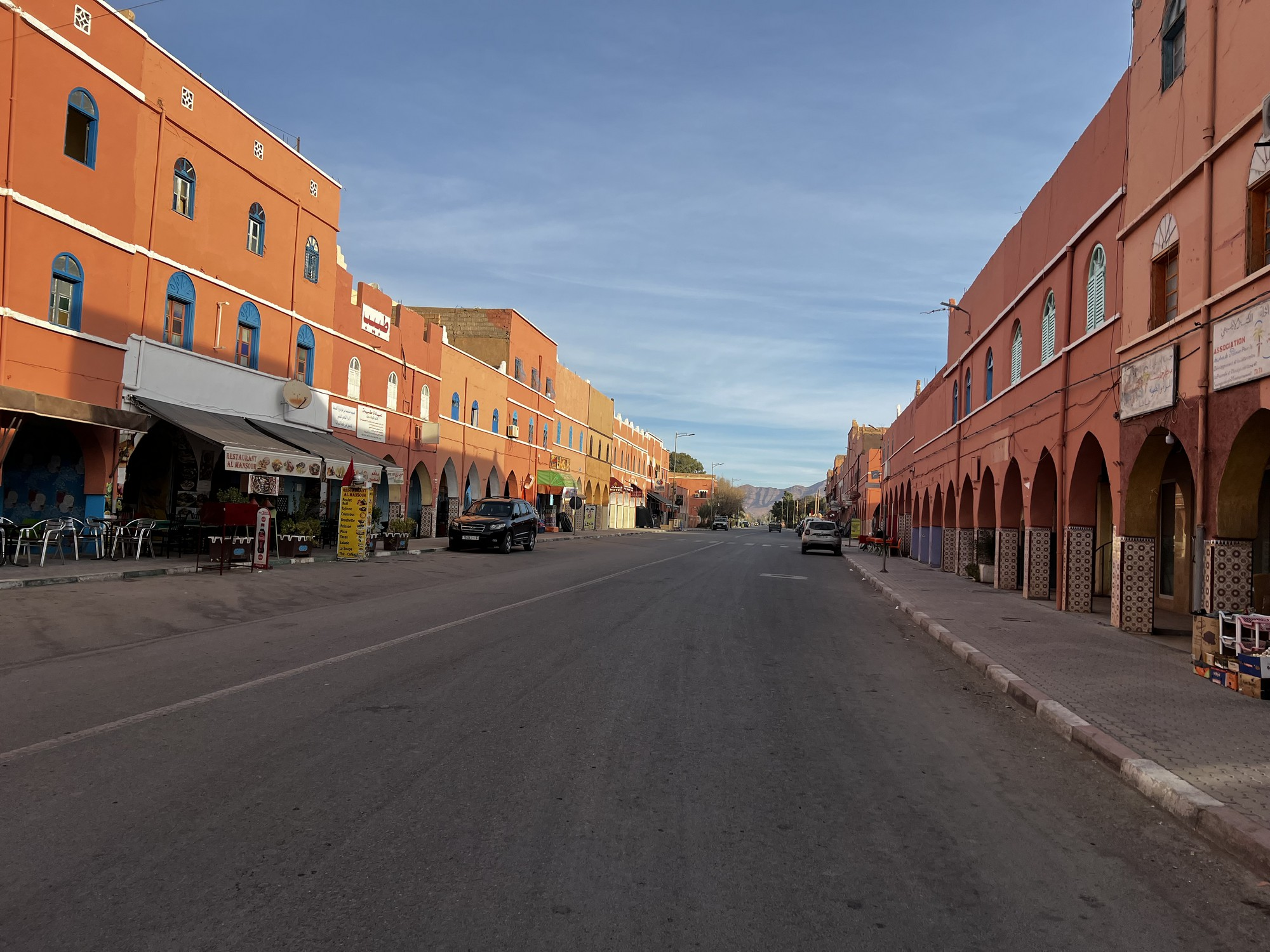
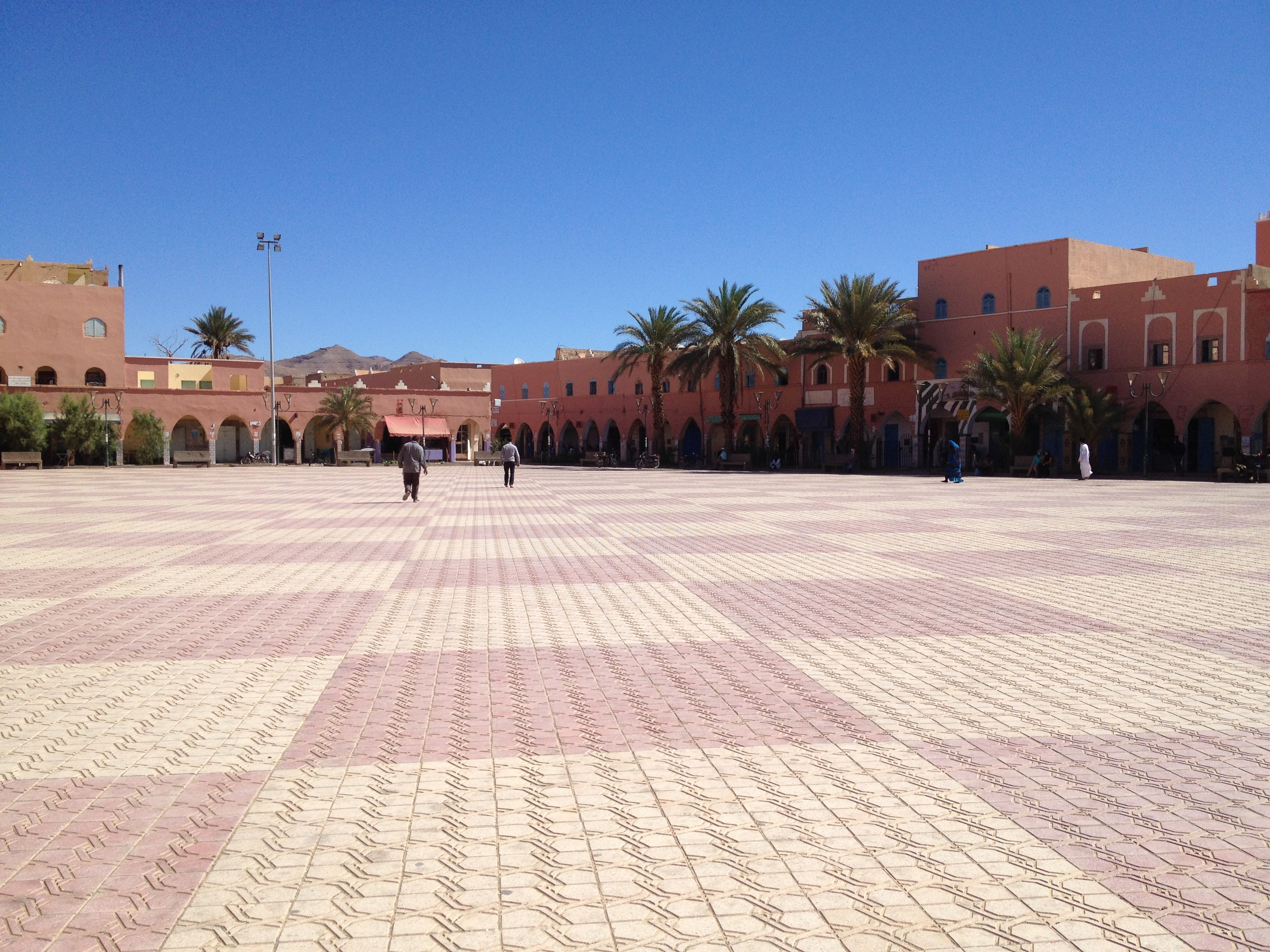
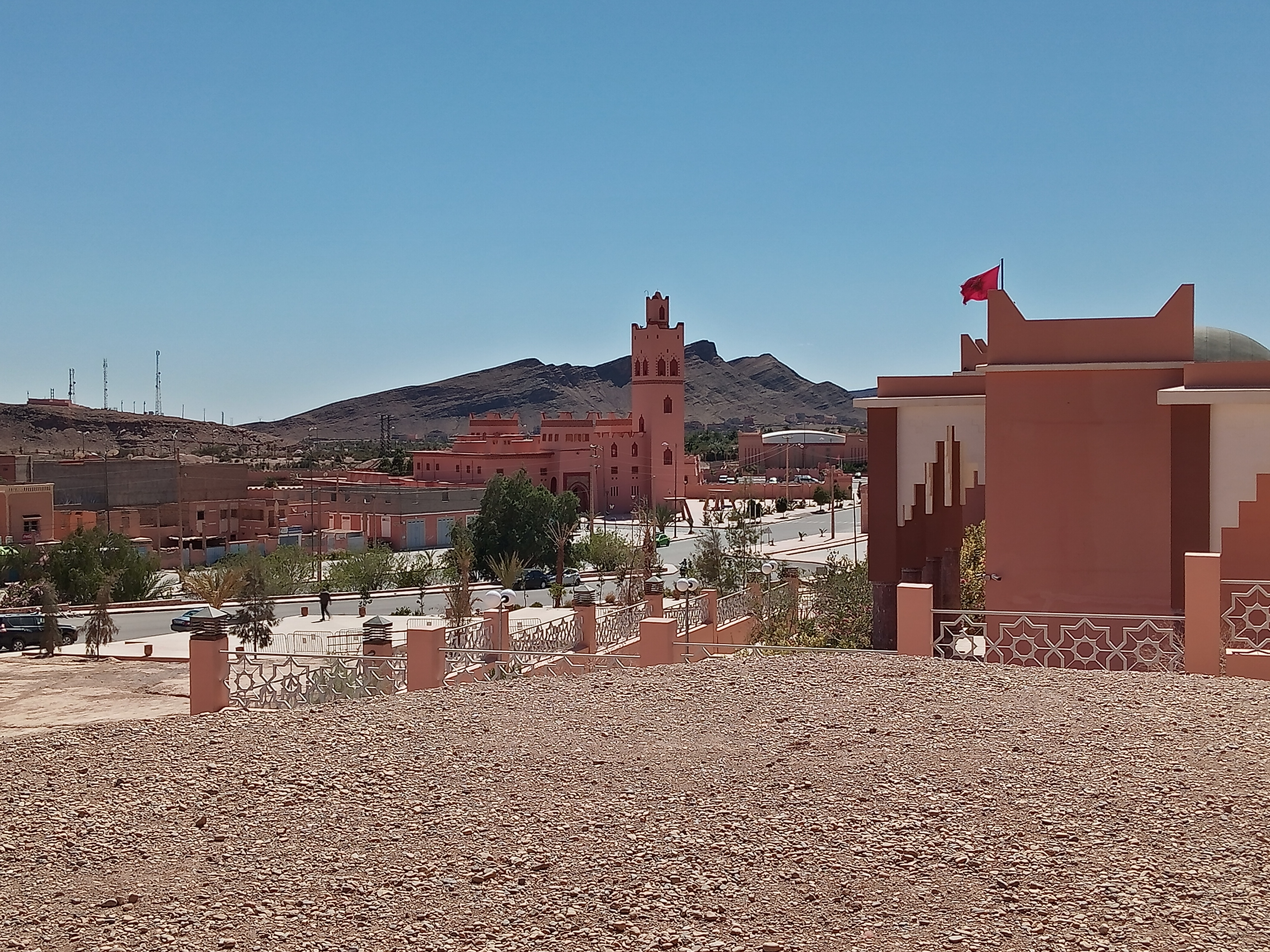
- Interactive map of Tata
- Coordinates: 29°44′34″N 7°58′21″W
- Country: Morocco
- Region: Souss-Massa
- Province: Tata Province

Government
  - Mayor: Lahcen Zoubair

Population (2014)
  - Total: 18,611
- Time zone: UTC+0 (GMT)
- Postal code: 48000

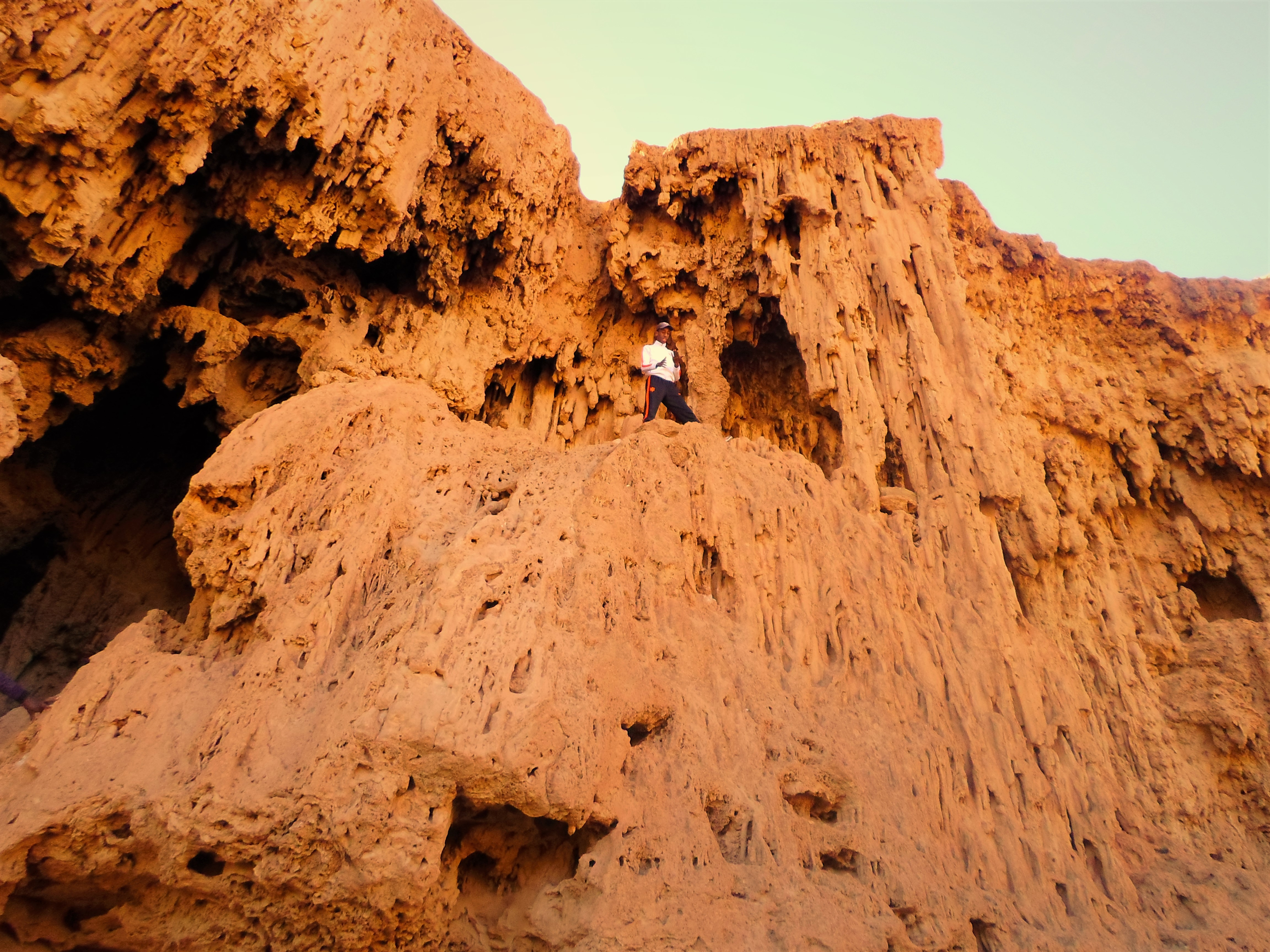
Caves de Messalite

Tata (Arabic: طاطا, Standard Moroccan Tamazight: ⵟⴰⵟⴰ) is a city in central Morocco with a population of 18,611 according to the country's 2014 census. It is the largest city in Tata Province.

It is situated on a desert plain of the Sahara Desert, southeast of Agadir and Taroudant, close to the Algerian border and the mountain range Anti-Atlas, located at the foot of the Bani mountain range, a lower range along the southern side of the Anti-Atlas (Arabic: سلسلة جبال باني). Tourists use the town as a base for excursions in the area. Tata lies on the N12 highway between the north-east of the regional capital Guelmim and the south of the neighboring region of Drâa-Tafilalet. Due to the remoteness of the area, there is no border crossing with Algeria.
