= Chtouka-Ait Baha Province =

Province of Morocco

Chtouka Aït Baha Province إقليم اشتوكة أيت باها ⵜⴰⵙⴳⴰ ⵏ ⵛⵜⵓⴽⴰ ⴰⵢⵜ ⴱⴰⵀⴰ
- Province
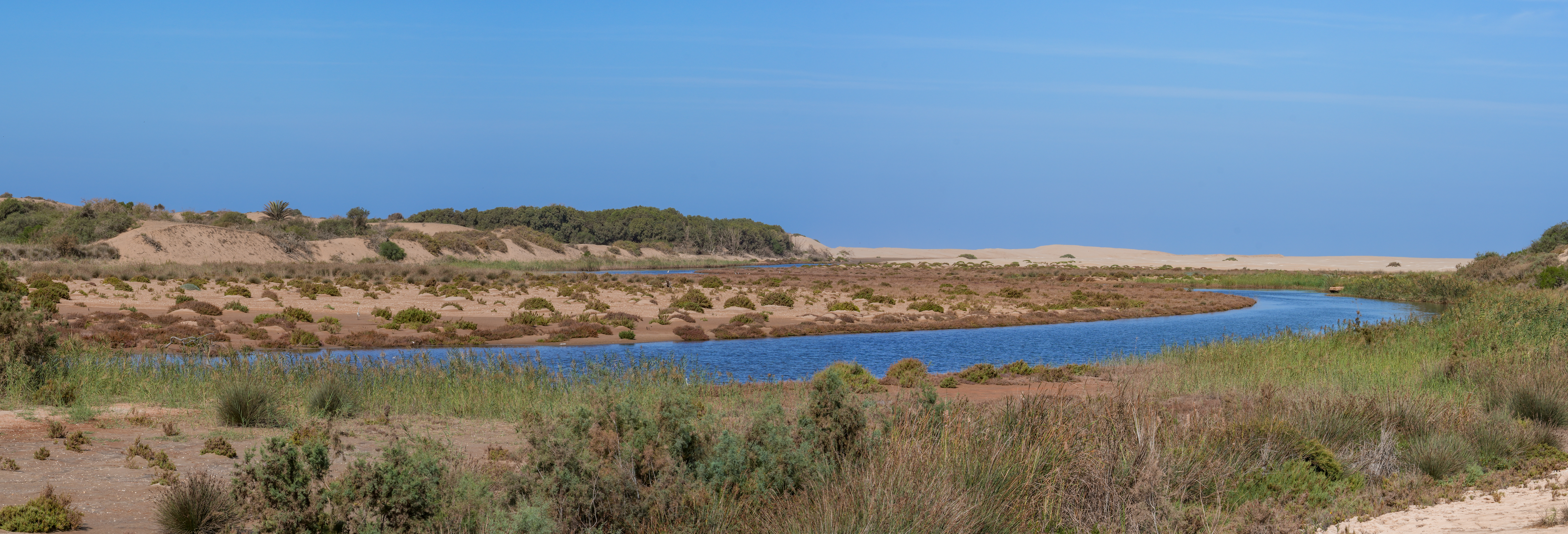
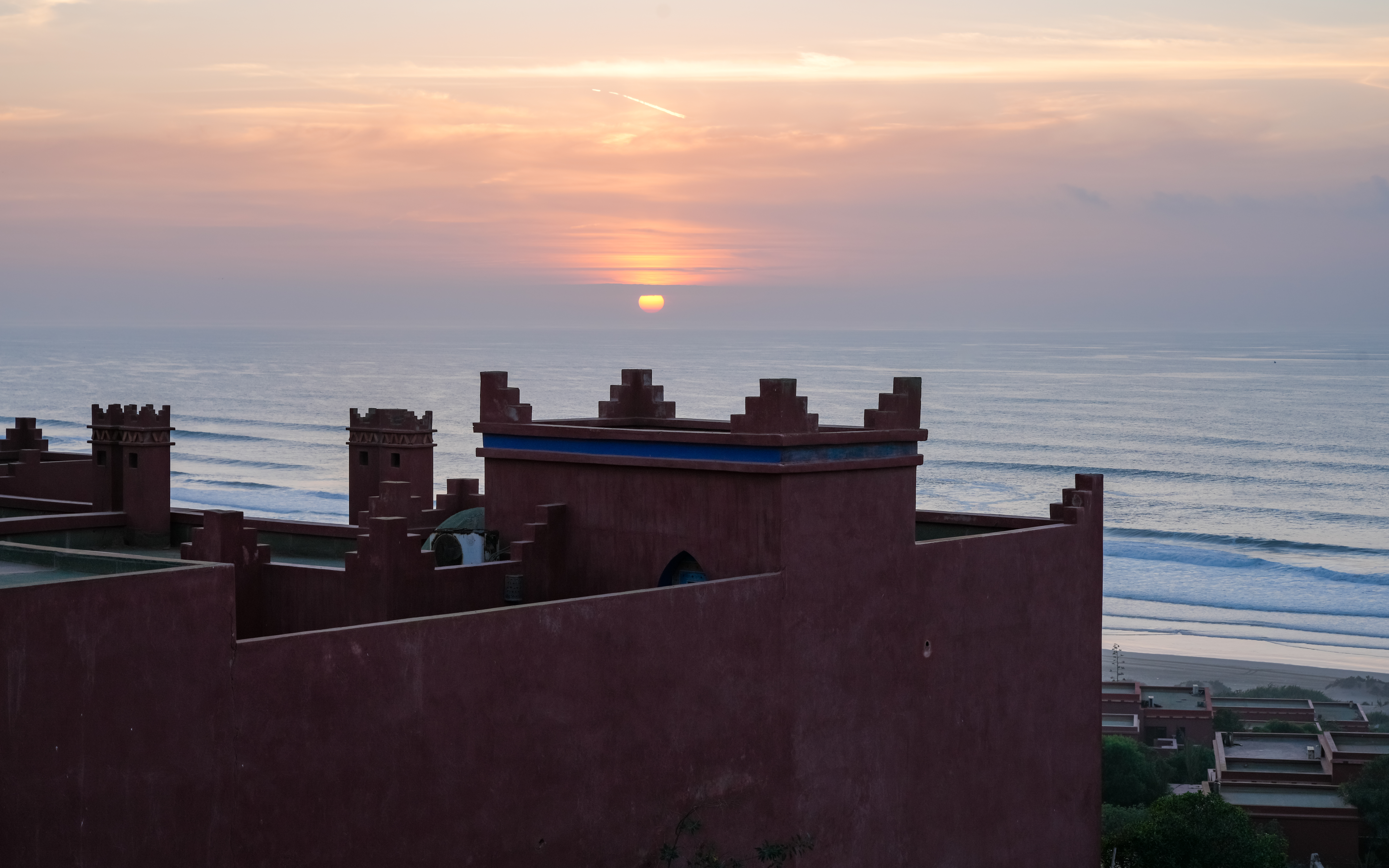
- Massa River Tanalt Tizourgane Sidi R'bat beach
- Interactive map of Chtouka Aït Baha Province
- Coordinates: 30°13′N 9°22′W
- Country: Morocco
- Region: Souss-Massa
- Seat: Biougra

Population (2024)
  - Total: 493,623
- Website: Chtouka Ait Baha

Chtouka Aït Baha (Arabic: اشتوكة أيت باها, Standard Moroccan Tamazight: ⵛⵜⵓⴽⴰ ⴰⵢⵜ ⴱⴰⵀⴰ) is a province in the Moroccan region of Souss-Massa. Its population in 2004 was 493,623. its capital is Biougra.

The major cities and towns are:

- Biougra
- Ait Amira
- Sidi Bibi
- Belfaa
- Massa
- Ait Baha

== Subdivisions ==
Communes of Chtouka Ait Baha Province

The province is divided administratively into the following:

=== Municipalities ===
Name	Geographic code	Households (2024)	Population (2024)	Notes
Ait Amira	163.01.01.	30592	113236	Urban centre: Ait Amira (78,163 inhabitants; 21,308 households)
Ait Baha	163.01.03.	1611	6007	
Biougra	163.01.11.	13774	50626	
Sidi Bibi	163.01.27.	18972	72929	Urban centre: Sidi Bibi (12,359 inhabitants; 3,008 households)

=== Rural communes ===
Name	Geographic code	Households (2024)	Population (2024)	Notes
Ait Milk	163.05.03.	2523	8706	
Ait Mzal	163.03.05.	970	3305	
Ait Ouadrim	163.03.07.	1455	4976	
Aouguenz	163.03.09.	1050	2941	
Belfaa	163.05.11.	9935	36774	Urban centre: Belfaâ (13,492 inhabitants; 3,649 households)
Hilala	163.03.13.	630	1858	
Ida Ougnidif	163.03.15.	787	2095	
Imi Mqourn	163.07.17.	2783	10365	
Inchaden	163.05.19.	11959	42724	
Massa	163.05.21.	4994	17946	Urban centre: Massa (11,496 inhabitants; 3,198 households)
Ouad Essafa	163.07.23.	21290	83442	
Sidi Abdallah El Bouchouari	163.03.25.	1834	6604	
Sidi Boushab	163.07.29.	2294	8386	
Sidi Ouassay	163.05.31.	2748	10050	
Tanalt	163.03.33.	766	2138	
Targua Ntouchka	163.03.35.	1083	3371	
Tassegdelt	163.03.37.	1260	4046	
Tizi Ntakoucht	163.03.39.	417	1098	
