= List of companies and cities in Africa that manufacture cement =

List of cement companies and cement-producing cities in Africa

== Countries ==
=== Algeria ===
- Amouda Ciment - a private producer with a presence in El Beida and other regions
- Biskria Ciment - a significant private operator located in Branis, Biskra, with an installed capacity of 5 million tons
- GICA Group (Groupe Industriel des Ciments d'Algérie) - the state-owned GICA Group is the largest producer, operating 14 cement plants across the country
- Hadjar Soud (Skikda)
- Lafarge Algérie - two plants, overall capacity of approximately 11.1 million tons
- Meftah (Blida)
- Saoura (Bechar)
- SCAK (Aïn El Kebira) - produces specialized oil-well cement
- SCHB (Hamma Bouziane) - a major facility in Constantine. Chlef Plant: A massive exporter, sending nearly 2 million tons of clinker to Europe in 2025.
- SCIBS (Beni Saf) - recently exported 45,000 tons to Mauritania and targeted 800,000 tons of grey cement sales for 2025
- Sour El Ghozlane

=== Angola ===
- Lobitoo - proposal 2006
- Nova Cimangola - state-owned cement company based in Luanda, associated with Scancem and Heidelberg Cement

=== Benin ===
- Onigbolo, Porto-Novo

=== Botswana ===
- Gaborone - expansion 2007

=== Burkina Faso ===
- Ouagadougou
- Ouagadougou - cement works

=== Burundi ===
- Bugarama
- Burundi Cement Company - BUCECO

=== Cameroon ===
- Bélabo - concrete sleepers
- Douala - portland cement
- Douala - cement works
- existing owned by LaFarge of France
- Limbe
- Yaoundé - national capital - portland cement

=== Central African Republic ===
- 75% from Ione, Cameroon

=== Democratic Republic of Congo (Congo Kinshasa) ===
- Lukala

=== Republic of the Congo (Congo Brazzaville) ===
- Loutété - rehabilitate 2005

=== Djibouti ===
- Djibouti Cement SARL - 200,000MTPA for local consumption, built by Saboo Engineers India, with Indian government funding

=== Egypt ===
Egypt is one of the biggest cement producers all over the world, and the leading country in the middle East, Africa, and the Arabian Region with a total production capacity of 50 million tons of cement.

- Al Arabia for Cement
- Al Sweedy for Cement
- Arabian Cement Co.
- CEMEX (Assiut Cement Company)
- Egyptian Cement Company recently became Lafarge Cement Egypt with a total production capacity of about 10 million tons of cement coming from five lines designed and manufactured by POLYSIUS FRANCE, LCE arranged as the second plant all over the world on the cement production.
- El Ammriya Cement Company
- Italcementi Group, Cairo - five plants, three business units; Suez Cement Plant, Qattamya Cement Plant, Tourah Cement Plant, Helwan Cement Plant, and the white Plant on Al Minya
- Misr-Beni Suef
- Misr-Quena
- The National Cement Company
- Sinai White Cement Portland
- South-Valley for Cement
- Titan Cement Company - two plants, one located in Alexandria and another in Beni-Suef

=== Equatorial Guinea ===
- Malabo - Cement Works Comercial Okomar, S.A.

=== Eritrea ===
- Massawa - port and railhead, under construction

=== Ethiopia ===
Ethiopia has 20 cement factories which produce mainly OPC and PPC cement. Two other cement factories are in the pipeline. As of 2017, production capacity in Ethiopian, according to the Ethiopian Reporter, had increased to 15 million tonnes per year, but local consumption was only 6 million tonnes per year.

=== Gabon ===
- Franceville - grinding
- Ntoum - integrated
- Owendo - CIMAF
- Owendo - grinding

=== Ghana ===
- Buipe - proposed
- Diamond Cement Ghana - 2001; railway siding Diamond Cement Ghana at Aflao near Lomé
- Ghana Cement 97% market share
- Ghacem - a subsidiary of Scancem and Heidelberg Cement, with operations in the port city of Tema

Note: "Ghacem" is the same as "Ghana Cement", and does not have 97% market share anymore because Buipe plant has been built, and is not really a subsidiary of Scancem, because Scancem is owned by Heidelberg Cement, and has two plants in Ghana:one in Tema, which was upgraded in November 2012 from 1.2 million tons per year to 2.2 Mton/year, and one in Sekondi-Takoradi, which can produce 1.2 Mton/year.

=== Guinea ===
- CIMAF Cement Works, Conakry
- Diamond Cement Guinea S.A., Kagbelen
- Onigbolo Cement Company

=== Ivory Coast ===
- Abidjan
- Abidjan - CIMAF
- San Pédro

=== Kenya ===
- Athi River Mining, Nairobi
- East African Portland Cement Co. Ltd
- Lafarge Bamburi Cement of Mombasa and Nairobi
- Marich - proposed 2009
- Mombasa Cement Ltd (MCL)
- National Cement Co. Ltd
- Rhino Cement Co. Ltd
- Savanna Cement Co. Ltd
- Simba Cement Co. Ltd
- South Africa Portland Cement

=== Liberia ===
- Monrovia

=== Libya ===
- Arabian Cement Co.
- Khoms - concrete sleeper plant by Walterbau, Germany
- Libyan Cement Company

=== Madagascar ===
Alpha Ciment - Ibity (Antsirabe), Vakinankaratra

=== Malawi ===
- Cement Products Limited, Mangochi
- LaFarge Portland Malawi, Blantyre
- Shayona Cement Corporation Limited, Kasungu

=== Mali ===
- Diamond Cements S.A., Bamako

=== Mauritania ===
- Nouakchott - Ciment de Mauritanie
- Nouakchott - MAFCI

=== Mauritius ===
- Port Louis, Mauritius - import

=== Morocco ===
Total production capacity was 19 million tons in 2017.

==== Béni Mellal-Khénifra region ====
- Beni Mellal (CIMAT)

==== Casablanca-Settat region ====
- Ben Ahmed (CIMAT)
- Casablanca (Holcim)
- Jorf Lasfar (Ciments du Maroc)
- Settat (Holcim)

==== Fès-Meknès region ====
- Fez (Holcim)
- Meknes (Holcim)

==== Laâyoune-Sakia El Hamra region ====
- Laayoune (Ciments du Maroc)

==== Marrakesh-Safi region ====
- Marrakesh (Ciments du Maroc)
- Safi (Ciments du Maroc)

==== Oriental region ====
- Nador (Holcim)
- Oujda (Holcim)

==== Rabat-Salé-Kénitra region ====
- Temara (Votorantim Cimentos)

==== Souss-Massa region ====
- Ait Baha (Ciments du Maroc)

==== Tanger-Tetouan-Al Hoceima region ====
- Tangiers (Holcim)
- Tetouan (Holcim)

=== Mozambique ===
- Cimentos de Mozambique, subsidiary of Portuguese company Cimpor at Matola
- Dondo - also concrete sleeper plant
- Nacala Sunera Cimentos

=== Namibia ===
- Karibib - proposed 2008
- Otavi - Ohorongo Cement, under construction 2010; rail siding

=== Niger ===
- Niamey - Société Nigérienne De Cimenterie (SNC)

=== Nigeria ===
- Bauchi-Gwana Cement, Alkaeri L.G.A. Bauchi (subsidiary of Cretent Intl)
- BUA Cement, Obu, Okpella, Edo State, former Edo cement, near Benin City
  - BUA Cement, Kalambaina Sokoto Stately - commissioned July 2018
- Cement Company of Northern Nigeria - also known as Sokoto Cement, with 6 offices in northern states
- Dangote Cement
  - Benue Cement Company (now under Dangote group)
  - Obajana cement factory (Dangote group), Ibeshe, Ogun state
  - Obajana cement factory (Dangote group), Obajana, Kogi State
- Lafarge
  - Ashaka Cement in Bauchi State in the north
  - Atlas Cement
  - Lakatabu cement factory (WAPCO Lafarge), Ifo, Ogun State
  - WAPCO in Lagos State
- Nigerian Cement

=== Rwanda ===
- Rwanda Cement Factory (CIMERWA)

=== Senegal ===
- Ciments du Sahel, Polysius AG subsidiary, Kirène - to be expanded in 2008
- Dangote Cement
- Societe Commerciale de Transport et d'Industrie (SUARL) in Dakar
- Sococim Industries, Rufisque

=== Sierra Leone ===
- Freetown

=== Somaliland ===
- Berbera Horn Cement Somaliland - MSG Group of Companies Horn Holding Group Ltd. 1.2 million tons of clinker, 23 million bags per year at 1.2 million tons clinker production

=== South Africa ===
- AfriSam
  - Brakpan (blending station)
  - Dudfield (Lichtenburg)
  - Roodepoort (grinding station)
  - Ulco (Kimberly)
  - Vanderbijlpark (slag grinding & blending station)
- Lafarge Cement
  - Lichtenburg
  - Randfontein (grinding station)
  - Richards Bay (grinding station)
- NPC Cimpor
  - Coedmore
  - Newcastle (slag grinding and cement blending plant)
  - Simuma
- Pretoria Portland Cement Company
  - De Hoek
  - Dwaalboom
  - Hercules (Pretoria)
  - Jupiter (Johannesburg)
  - Port Elizabeth
  - Riebeeck West
  - Saldanha (slag grinding only)
  - Slurry
- Sephaku Cement
  - Aganang (Lichtenburg)
  - Delmas (grinding station)

=== Sudan ===
- Aslan Cement Factory - rail junction - river in Khartoum Region
- Atbara - rail junction - river in atbara Region
- Rabak - rail junction - river

=== Tanzania ===
- Athi River Mining, Dar es Salaam & Tanga
- Camel Cement, Dar es Salaam
- Dangote Industries Tanzania, Mtwara
- Kilimanjaro Cement, Moshi
- Kilwa Cement, Lindi
- Kisarawe Cement, Dar Es Salaam
- Nyati Cement, Dar es Salaam
- Mbeya Cement, Mbeya
- Tanga Cement, Tanga
- Twiga Cement, Dar es Salaam

=== Togo ===
- Cimtogo, Lomé
- Tabligbo - CIMAO clinker works (proposed)
- WACEM, Lomé

=== Tunisia ===
- Benzert - privatized in 1997
- Carthage Cement - built in 2013 by FL Smith with capacity of 6500TPD, based in EL Mourouj
- La société des Ciments Artificiels Tunisiens (CAT) - part of Italian group COLACEM, based in Tunis
- La société des Ciments de Gabès (SCG) - from the Portuguese group SECIL, based in Gabès
- La société des Ciments de Jbel Oust (CJO) - from the Brazilian group Votorantim Cimentos, based in Jbel Oust
- La société des Ciments d'Enfidha (CE) - from the Spanish group UNILAND, based in Enfidha
- La SOTACIB - white cement production plant, from the Spanish group PRASA, based in Tunis

=== Uganda ===
- Hima Cement Limited, Hima, in Kasese District (29% market share)
- Kampala Cement Company Limited, Namataba, Mukono District (5% market share)
- Moroto Cement Limited, Moroto, in Moroto District (32% market share)
- Tororo Cement Limited, Tororo, Tororo District (34% market share)

=== Zambia ===
==== Lusaka ====
- AMAKA Cement
- Lafarge Cement Zambia in Chilanga
- SINOMA plant

==== Ndola ====
- Chilanga Cement Plant
- Dangote
- Zambezi Portland Cement

=== Zimbabwe ===
- Lafarge Cement Zimbabwe, formerly Circle Cement, Harare
- Live Touch Cement Company, Redcliff
- Pacstar Cement Company, Redcliff
- Sino Zimbabwe Cement Company, Gweru
- Unicem, fully owned by PPC Cement
  - Bulawayo
  - Colleen Bawn
  - Harare

== See also ==
- Portland cement
- Concrete sleeper
- Cement mill
- Cement kiln
- List of countries by cement production
