= Mount Adad Madani =

Mountain in Tiznit, Morocco

Adad Madani Mountain
- Location within Morocco

Highest point
- Elevation: 1,470 m (4,820 ft)
- Coordinates: 29°46′01″N 9°14′55″W

Geography
- Country: Morocco
- Province: Chtouka Aït Baha Province
- Parent range: Anti-Atlas

Mount Adad Madani (in Tamazight: ⴰⴰⴷⴷⵔⴰⴰⵔ ⵏⴰⴷⴰⵣ ⵎⴰⴷⵏⵉ, also pronounced in Arabic: Adrar Nadaz Namdani) is a mountain of the Western Anti-Atlas with a height of 1,470 metres (4,820 ft) above sea level. It is located 75 kilometers (47 mi) northeast of the city of Tiznit in the Aouguenz commune in the Chtouka Aït Baha region of the Souss-Massa region in southern Morocco. The mountain is located in the center of the Argan Tree Biosphere Reserve.

== Name ==
The name Adad Madani is a corruption of the original Amazigh name Adaz Namdani or Adad Namdani which means people's finger. Also, in another narrative is believed to be named after Wali Sidi al-Madani, or the brother of Wali Sidi Ayza, or whoever is buried in the ancient school of Tizkin who was buried at the top of Mount Adad Madani. There are also those who say that the reason for the name is that the mountain has the shape of a finger from a specific angle of view and people see it from afar, so it is called people's finger.

== Geography ==
=== Geology ===
On a geological level, Mount Adad Madani is composed of quartzite and rhyolite that dates back to the Precambrian era as noticed by French scientist François Cuzin who visited the area in March 1996 as part of an expedition to the region. In some places this geological formation that belongs to the Precambrian can be found in the Anzhi region, which consists of schist and sandstone. Also a type of brown and red soil on the slopes can be found.

=== Climate ===
The climate of the mountain and the region is not well studied due to lack of data, but compared to neighboring regions, the average annual precipitation in Tiznit and Tafraoute is less than 200 mm (7.9 in), while Anzi and Tanalt are, respectively, 234 and 351 mm (9.2 and 13.8 in).

=== Vegetation ===
Mount Adad Madani is one of the few habitats for the Ajkal dracaena draco trees, which was discovered by chance by the French scientist François Cuzin while traveling to the area in 1996. This discovery has drawn botanists and scientists to the tree's habitat to unravel the mystery of its existence in the region. The word "Ajkal" means "suspended" or "inaccessible" in Amazigh.

== Stories and myths ==
Mount Adad Madani is considered a sacred mountain in the region and for the inhabitants, it can be seen from afar and from all over Anzi and its surroundings, in addition to the fact that climbing it is dangerous and many of those who ventured to climb it lost their lives. There are many stories, myths and folk tales told about this mountain, but they lack reliable sources. One of the folk tales says that Sidi al-Madani decided to take refuge in the mountain after he was living in one of the plains and a soldier of the Makhzen which is the state at that time was passing by his house on his way to carry out one of his missions, feeling hungry, he asked Sidi al-Madani to feed him so he cooked him the only chicken he had. One of Sidi al-Madani's sons was crying out of hunger, so his father fed him a chicken leg. The Makhzeni noticed that the cooked chicken had only one leg, so he asked him why, and he replied that he had given it to his hungry little son. The Makhzeni was furious and ordered the child to be brought in and then amputated his entire leg, and he has been disabled ever since. Sidi al-Madani was so angry that he left his village for good and settled at the top of the mountain where no government could reach him. Another version says that the person buried at the top of the mountain is another of the Shorafaa al-Sabaean. Every year, the poor, followers of one of the Sufi zawiyas in the area later known as the poor of the Aydawaltit sect, would make a pilgrimage to the shrine, where they built a night shelter at the top of the mountain; they also dug a cistern to collect rainwater for drinking.

Another story said that Sidi Hammad or Moussa visited the tomb of Sidi Ayza or Ali in Tizkin and prayed at the place called al-Marka'a where people still pray at the same place during the Tezkin season near the old school. Then he continued his journey through the neighboring villages, accompanied by his followers, later known as the poor of the Aydawaltit sect. Sidi Ahmed or Moussa is considered the founder of this Sufi order. He then continued on his way to Mount Adad Madani, and it is said that his horse's tracks are still carved into one of the mountain's rocks. The order still follows the same path as the Sidi Ahmad or Moussa al-Samlali walked in the 17th-century. Now the poor no longer climb the rugged mountain they just take a car ride to the village of Timjisht, which is near the top of the mountain.

=== Adad Madani tomb ===
There are different opinions about who is buried at the top of Adad Madani, with some sources saying the grandfather of the Shorafaa al-Sabaean tribe, Amer Al Hamel Al Idrissi Al Hassani and others Sidi al-Madani, the brother of Sidi Aiza, or Ali of the ancient school of Tizkin. The mountaintop also includes two other unidentified graves.
