= Simba Cement Uganda Limited =

Cement manufacturer in Uganda

Coordinates: 00°44′05″N 34°11′02″E

- Type: Private
- Industry: Manufacturer and distributor of cement
- Founded: May 2018; 8 years ago
- Headquarters: Tororo, Uganda
- Key people: Narendra Raval (managing director)
- Products: Cement
- Number of employees: ~ 400 (2018)

Simba Cement Uganda Limited (SCUL), also National Cement Company Uganda, is a cement manufacturer in Uganda. It is a subsidiary of National Cement Company Limited, the construction materials manufacturer based in Kenya. National Cement is a subsidiary of the Devki Group of Companies.

== Location ==
The factories and main offices of SCUL are located off of the Tororo–Mbale Road, in Nyakesi Village, Nyakesi Parish, Rubongi sub-county, in Tororo District, approximately 9 kilometres (6 mi) by road north of the central business district of the town of Tororo. The coordinates of the Simba Cement Uganda Limited Complex are: 0°44'05.0"N, 34°11'02.0"E (Latitude:0.734709; Longitude:34.183878).

== Overview ==
The new cement factory has an installed production capacity of one million metric tonnes annually. It was developed at an estimated cost of US$185 million. Other credible sources have estimated the cost at US$199 million. Commercial production started during the first half of 2018. Installed capacity production is 3,000 metric tonnes daily, which translates to about 800,000 metric tonnes annually.

== Ownership ==
SCUL is a wholly owned subsidiary of National Cement Company Limited (NCCL) based in Kenya. The shareholding in National Cement Kenya, the parent of Simba Cement Uganda Limited, is as illustrated in the table below:

National Cement stock ownership
Rank	Name of owner	Percentage ownership
1	Devki Group owned by Narendra Raval and family	85.0
2	International Finance Corporation (IFC)	7.5
3	IFC Subsidiary Company	7.5
	Total	100.0

== Construction ==
The main contractor was Mepani Technical Services Limited. The construction of the factory (excluding equipment and systems) cost an estimated US$55 million, and took two and one half years. Official commissioning took place on 29 August 2018.

== See also ==
- List of cement manufacturers in Uganda
- Tororo Steel Mill
