= List of cement manufacturers in Uganda =

This is a list of companies that manufacture cement in Uganda.

- Tororo Cement Limited
- Hima Cement Limited
- Kampala Cement Company Limited
- Simba Cement Uganda Limited
- Metro Cement Limited (based in Mbale, Uganda)
- Sinoma Cement Factory Uganda Limited (under development)

== Production ==
As of March 2018, Uganda cement manufacturers had installed capacity of 6,800,000 tonnes of cement annually, with Tororo Cement Limited being responsible for 3.0 million tonnes (44 percent) and Hima Cement Limited producing 1.9 million tonnes (28 percent). Simba Cement Uganda Limited produces 1 million tonnes annually (15 percent). The remaining companies are responsible for the remaining 900,000 tonnes (13 percent).

In January 2018, Uganda's consumption was estimated at 2.4 million tonnes annually; 35.3 percent of total annual production, although that percentage is on the rise, given the multitude of major, ongoing infrastructure projects in the county. The remaining output that is not consumed locally is marketed to regional neighboring countries, including Rwanda, Kenya, South Sudan and eastern Democratic Republic of the Congo.

== Market sharing ==
The table below illustrates the rankings of Uganda's cement manufacturers, based on annual production figures, for the calendar year 2018.

Market share rankings of Uganda's cement companies
Rank	Name of owner	Annual tonnage	Market share
1	Tororo Cement Limited	3.0 million	44.0
2	Hima Cement Limited	2.0 million	28.0
3	Simba Cement Uganda Limited	1.0 million	14.0
4	Kampala Cement Company Limited	1.0 million	14.0
	Total	7.0 million	100.00

== See also ==
- List of cement manufacturers in Kenya
- List of cement manufacturers in Rwanda
- List of cement manufacturers in Tanzania
- List of companies and cities in Africa that manufacture cement
