= List of Indians in Africa =

The list of Indians in Africa is a dynamic list of notable people of Indian extraction who have lived or worked in Africa.

== A ==
- Anil Agarwal, founder of Vedanta Group

== C ==
- Manu Chandaria, founder of Comcraft Group

== J ==
- Savitri Jindal, politician

== M ==
- Mayur Madhvani, founder of Madhvani Group
- Rajan Mahtani
- Naushad Merali (1951–2021), businessman

== R ==
- Narendra Raval, businessman and founder of Devki Group
- Sudhir Ruparelia, founder of Ruparelia Group

== S ==
- Bhimji Depar Shah, businessman and founder of Bidco Group
- Prateek Suri, founder of Maser Group

== V ==
- Sunil Vaswani, businessman

== See also ==
- Indian diaspora in Southeast Africa
- Indian diaspora in Africa
