= National Cement Company Limited =

Kenyan building products conglomerate

Coordinates: 01°29′31″S 37°03′26″E

National Cement Kenya Limited
- Company type: Private
- Industry: Manufacturer and distributor of cement
- Founded: 2008; 18 years ago
- Headquarters: Nairobi-Mombasa Road, Athi River, Kenya
- Key people: Narendra Raval; Group Chairman
- Products: Cement
- Number of employees: ~1,200 (2019)
- Website: Homepage

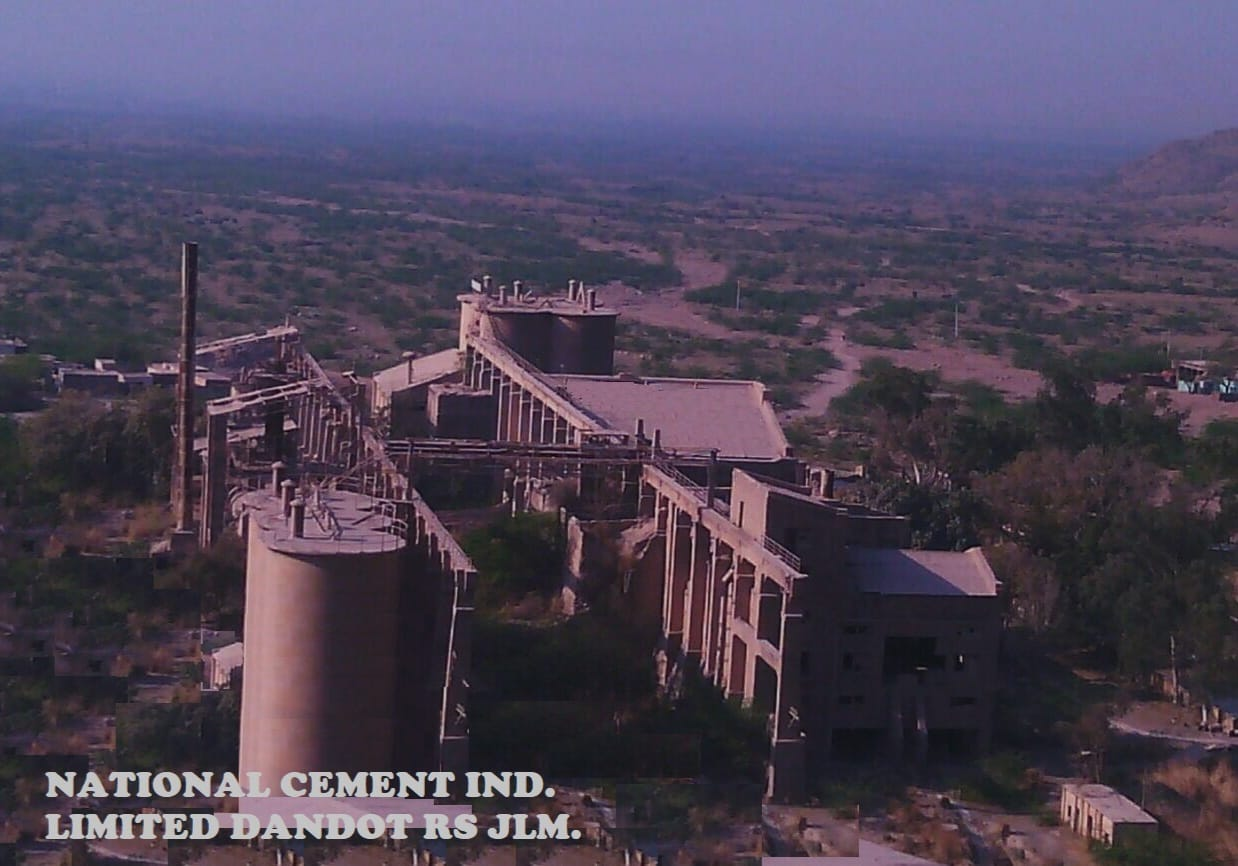

National Cement Company Limited (NCCL), also National Cement Company Kenya Limited, is a cement manufacturer in Kenya. It is a subsidiary of the Devki Group of Companies, an industrial and manufacturing conglomerate, with headquarters in Kenya and operating subsidiaries in Kenya, Uganda and the Democratic Republic of the Congo.

== Location ==
The main factories of NCCL are located off of the Nairobi-Mombasa Road, in the town of Athi River, Machakos County. This is approximately 39 kilometres (24 mi), by road, south-east of Nairobi, the capital city of Kenya. The coordinates of the main factory are 1°29'31.0"S, 37°03'26.0"E (Latitude:-1.491944; Longitude:37.057222).

== Overview ==
National Cement Company Limited was established in 2008 and began cement production in 2010.

As of April 2018, NCCL was the largest indigenous cement manufacturer in Kenya, with several plants in the country. It owns 100 percent of Simba Cement Uganda Limited, a cement factory in the Ugandan town of Tororo, with installed manufacturing capacity of one million metric tonnes annually.

== Ownership ==
The company ownership as of 2018 is as illustrated in the table below:

National Cement Stock Ownership
Rank	Name of Owner	Percentage Ownership
1	Devki Group owned by Narendra Raval and Family	85.0
2	International Finance Corporation (IFC)	7.5
3	IFC Subsidiary Company	7.5
	Total	100.0

== Recent developments ==
In May 2019, NCCL signed a binding all-cash offer of US$50 million to acquire the Kenyan assets and all subsidiaries of ARM Cement Plc. (In Receivership), as a going concern. The offer requires regulatory approval in Kenya.

The ARM acquisition will be funded with US$25 million in internally generated cash and loans from the International Finance Corporation and Kenya Commercial Bank Group. With the new acquisition NCCL will have production capacity of 1,400,000 metric tonnes annually, accounting for 13 percent of total national production.

== See also ==
- List of cement manufacturers in Kenya
