= Massa, Morocco =

Massa ماسة (Arabic), ⵎⴰⵙⵙⵜ (Tamazight)
- Town
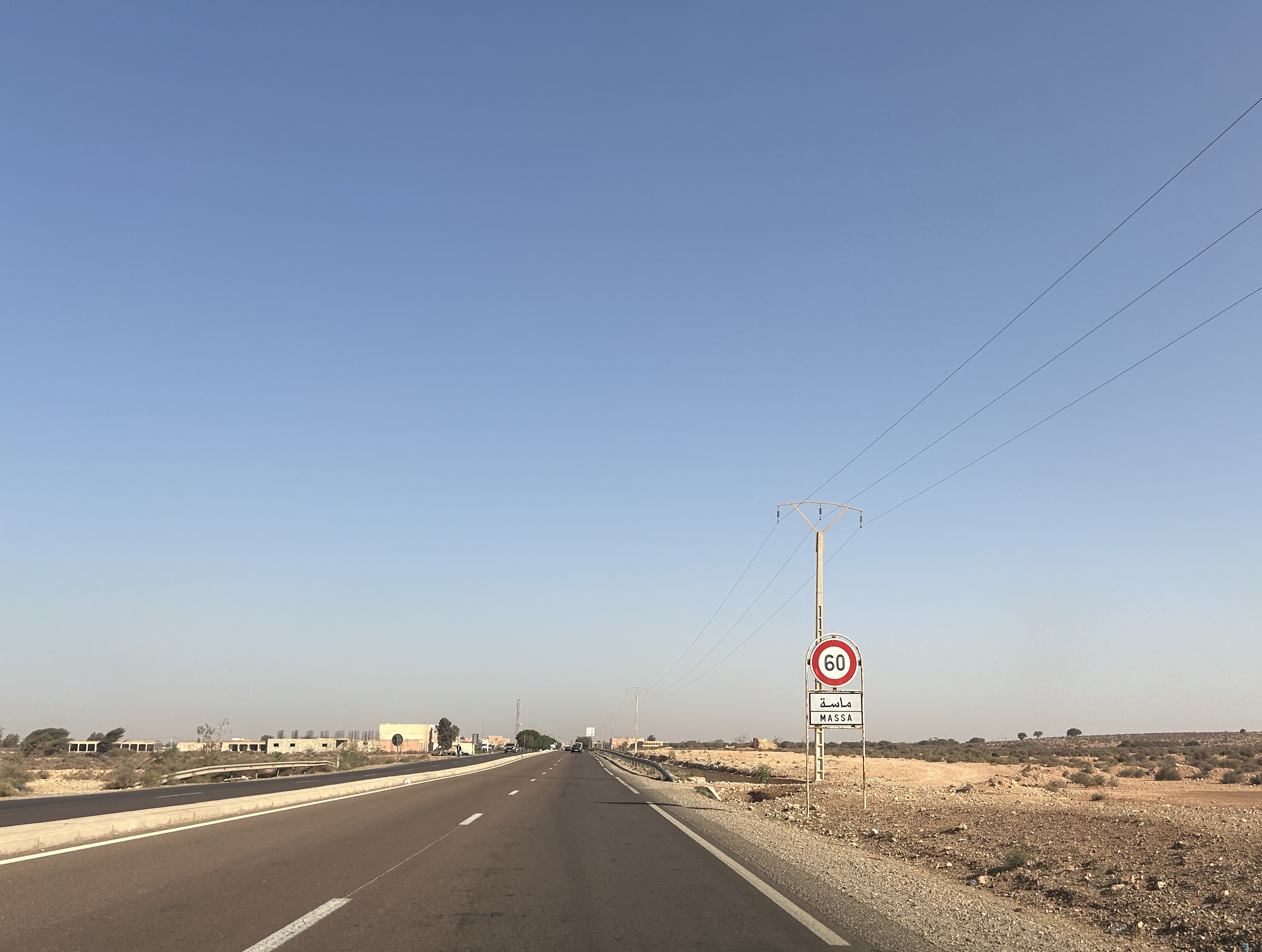

- Location within Morocco
- Coordinates: 29.993°N 9.645°W
- Country: Morocco
- Region: Souss-Massa
- Province: Chtouka Aït Baha

Population (2024)
  - Total: 17,854
- Time zone: UTC+0 (GMT)

Massa is a town in Chtouka Aït Baha Province, Souss-Massa, Morocco. According to the 2024 census it has a population of 17,854.
