= Grace Oburu =

Ugandan politician

Member of Parliament for Tororo District

Commissioner, Judicial Service Commission
- Incumbent
- Assumed office February 2012

Personal details
- Born: Uganda
- Occupation: Politician
- Known for: Former MP for Tororo District; Judicial Service Commission Commissioner

Grace Oburu is a Ugandan former Member of Parliament for Tororo District. She was appointed as the Judicial Service Commission Commissioner by President Museveni in February 2012.

== See also ==
- Parliament of Uganda
