= Devki Group =

Kenyan manufacturing conglomerate

Coordinates: 01°08′58″S 36°57′22″E

- Company type: Private Conglomerate
- Industry: Manufacturing of building materials, aviation
- Founded: 1986; 40 years ago
- Headquarters: Ruiru, Kiambu County, Kenya
- Key people: Narendra Raval; Executive Chairman
- Products: Cement, aluminum, steel, helicopter charters
- Revenue: US$650+ million (2020)
- Number of employees: 6,500+ (2020)
- Website: Homepage

The Devki Group of Companies, commonly referred to as the Devki Group, is a privately owned conglomerate in Kenya. Narendra Raval, a wealthy Kenyan industrialist and philanthropist, is a majority shareholder in each of the companies in the Group. The majority of the companies in the group focus on the manufacturing of building materials, including cement, aluminum and steel. The group has subsidiaries in Kenya, Uganda, Rwanda and the Democratic Republic of the Congo.

== Location ==
The group has its headquarters along Ruiru–Kamiti Road, in Ruiru Town, Kiambu County. It is approximately 25.5 kilometres (16 mi), by road, northeast of the central business district of Nairobi, Kenya's capital and largest city. The factories of the subsidiary companies are located in various Kenyan locations and in three other regional countries.

== Overview ==
As of April 2021, Devki Group is mainly involved in the manufacture of building materials, including steel, aluminum and cement. At that time, the group was the largest manufacturer of cement and steel in Kenya.

The Group's founder and executive chairman, is the majority shareholder in the companies that comprise the group. In April 2021 Business Daily Africa estimated his net worth at over US$500 million. At that time the conglomerate manufactured products worth over US$650 million annually and employed more than 6,500 workers.

== History ==
Narendra Raval came to Kenya in 1982, poor and single. In 1986, newly married, he and his wife, Neeta, started a hardware store in the Gikomba Market in Nairobi. Business grew and several years later, with the help of a bank loan of US$70,000, they were able to establish their first steel mill.

== Subsidiary companies ==
As of November 2025, the companies of the Devki Group included but were not limited to the following:

1. Devki Steel Mills Limited: Ruiru, Kenya

2. Maisha Mabati Mills Limited: Ruiru, Kenya

3. National Cement Company Limited: Athi River, Kenya.

4. Maisha Packaging Company Limited: Athi River, Kenya

5. Northwood Aviation Limited: Nairobi, Kenya.

6. Simba Cement Uganda Limited: Tororo, Uganda.

7. ARM Cement Limited: Athi River, Kenya.

8. Cimerwa Cement Limited: Bugarama, Rusizi District, in the Western Province of Rwanda.

9. Tororo Steel Mill: Tororo, Tororo District, in the Eastern Region of Uganda.

== See also ==
- List of conglomerates in Kenya
- List of conglomerates in Africa
- List of wealthiest people in Kenya
