= Biougra =

Town in Souss-Massa, Morocco

Coordinates: 30°12′52″N 9°22′15″W

Biougra بيوكرى ⴱⵉⴳⵯⵔⴰ
- Town
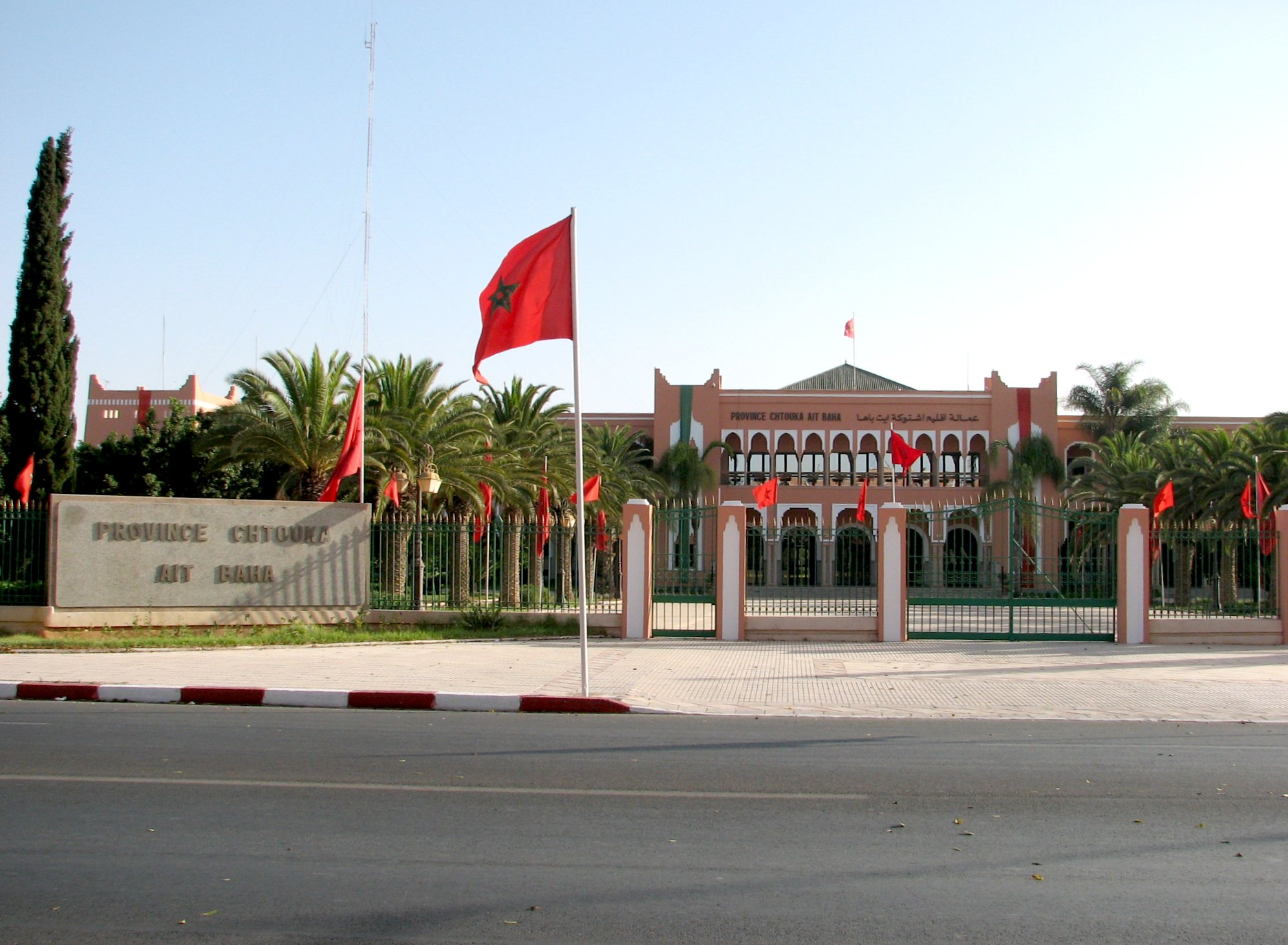
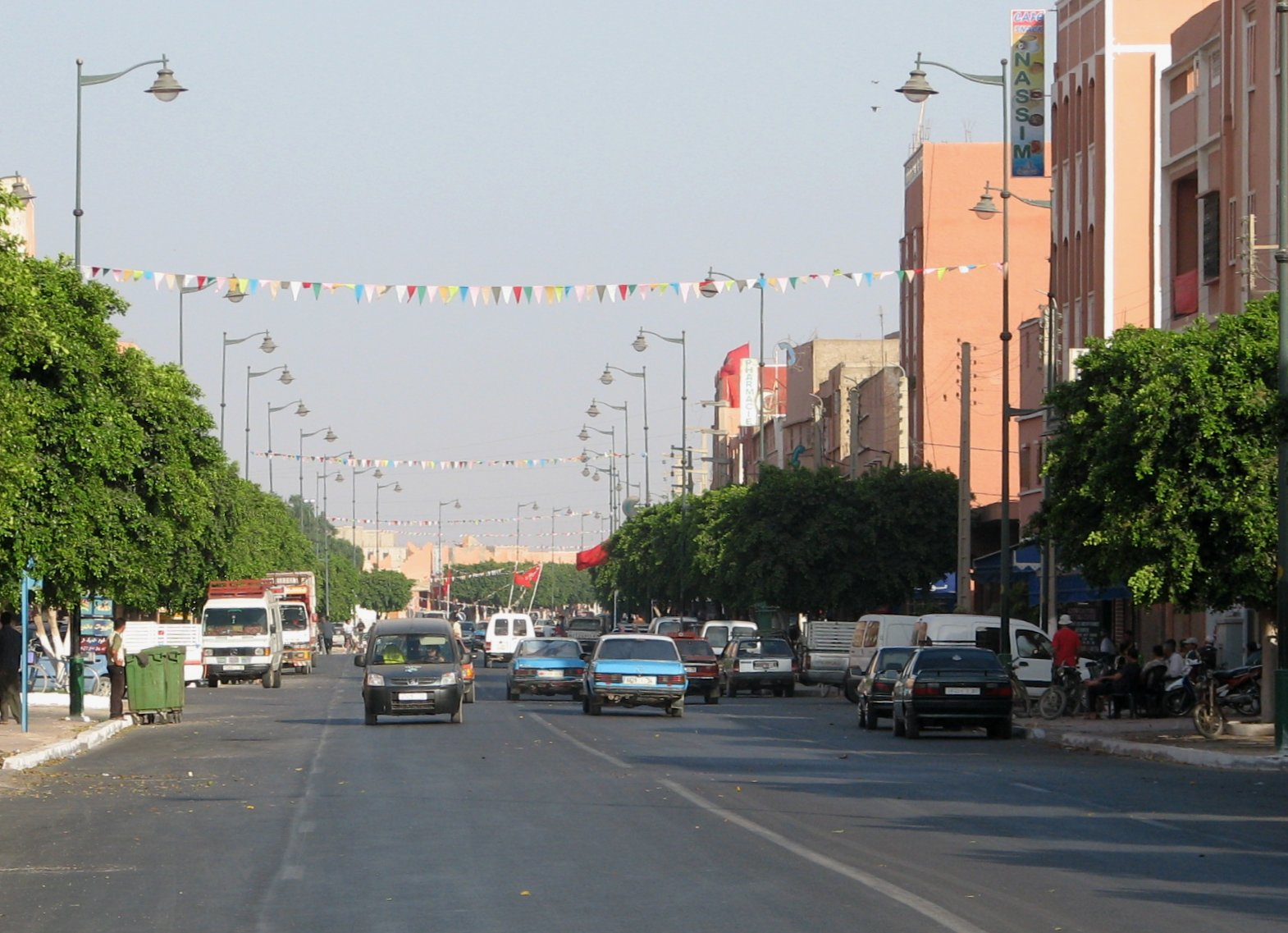
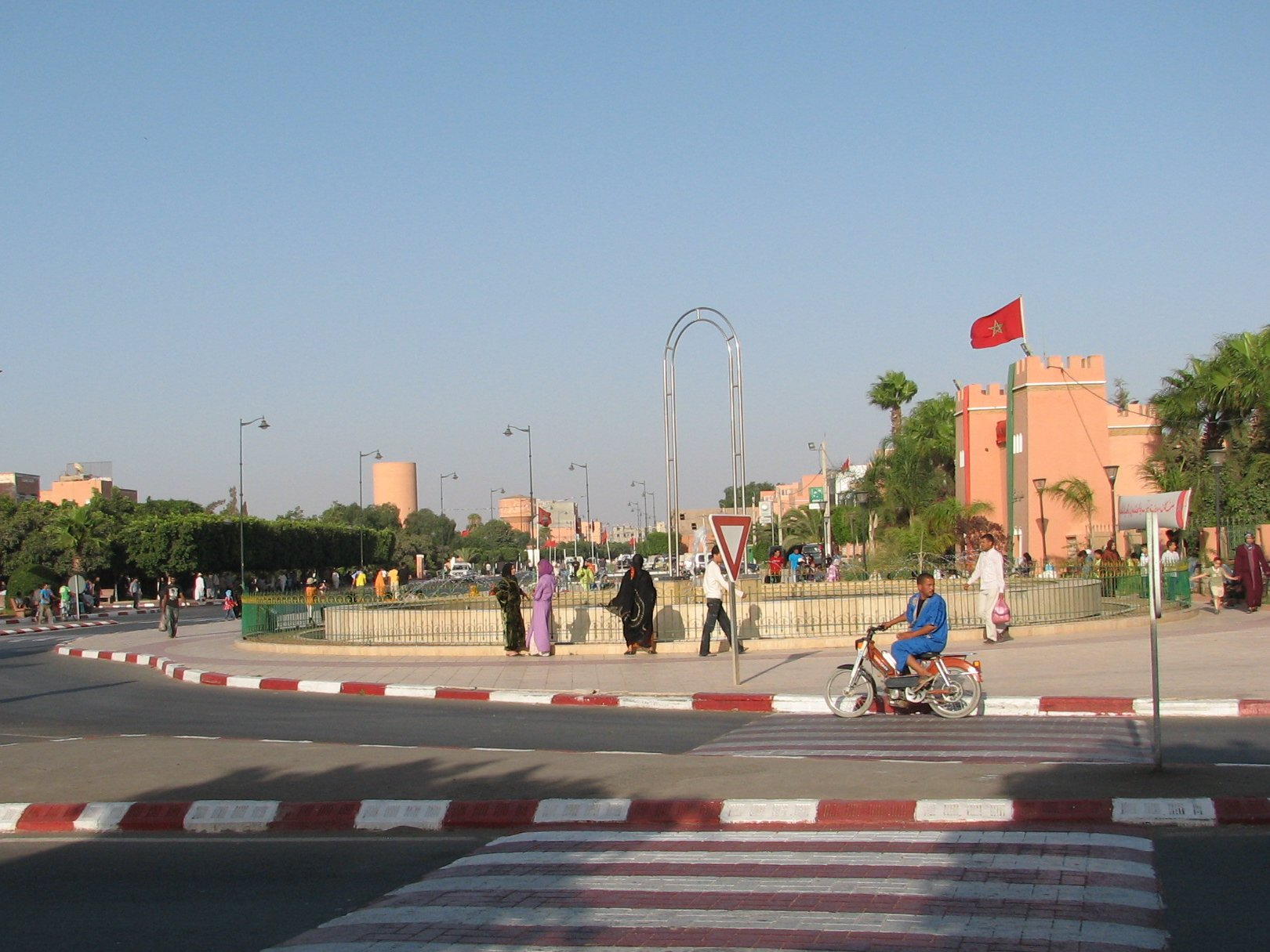
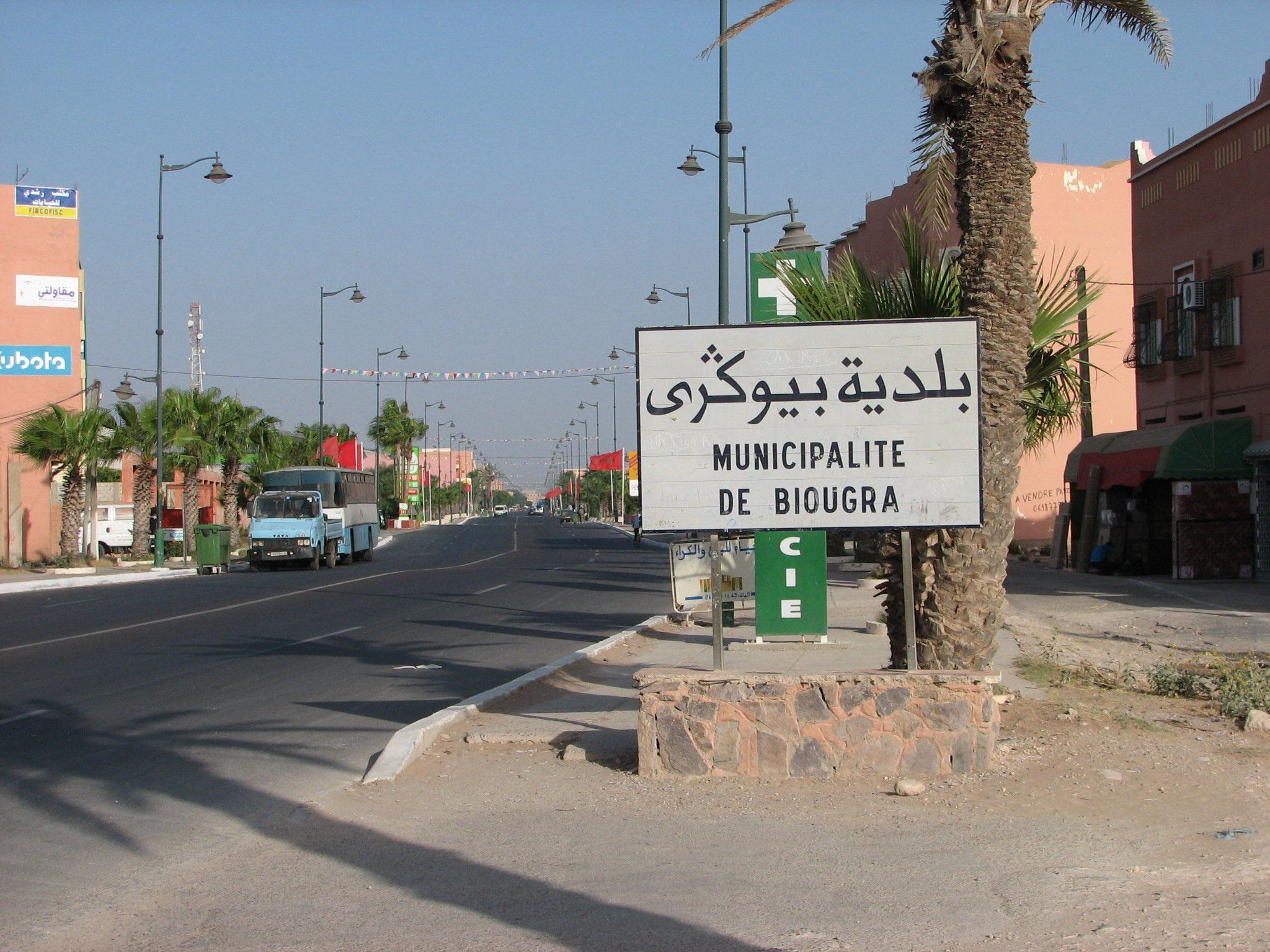
- Interactive map of Biougra
- Country: Morocco
- Region: Souss-Massa
- Province: Chtouka Aït Baha

Government
  - Type: Urban community

Area
  - Total: 3.9 sq mi (10 km^{2})

Population (2014)
  - Total: 37,933
- Time zone: UTC+0 (GMT)
- Postal code: 87200
- Website: https://www.biougra.com

Biougra (Arabic: بيوكرى, romanized: biyūkrā; Tachelhit: ⴱⵉⴳⵯⵔⴰ, romanized: big^{w}ra) is a town that serves as capital of Chtouka Aït Baha Province, Souss-Massa, Morocco, it is located 17 km from Aït Melloul and 37 km from Agadir. According to the 2014 census it has a population of 37,933.

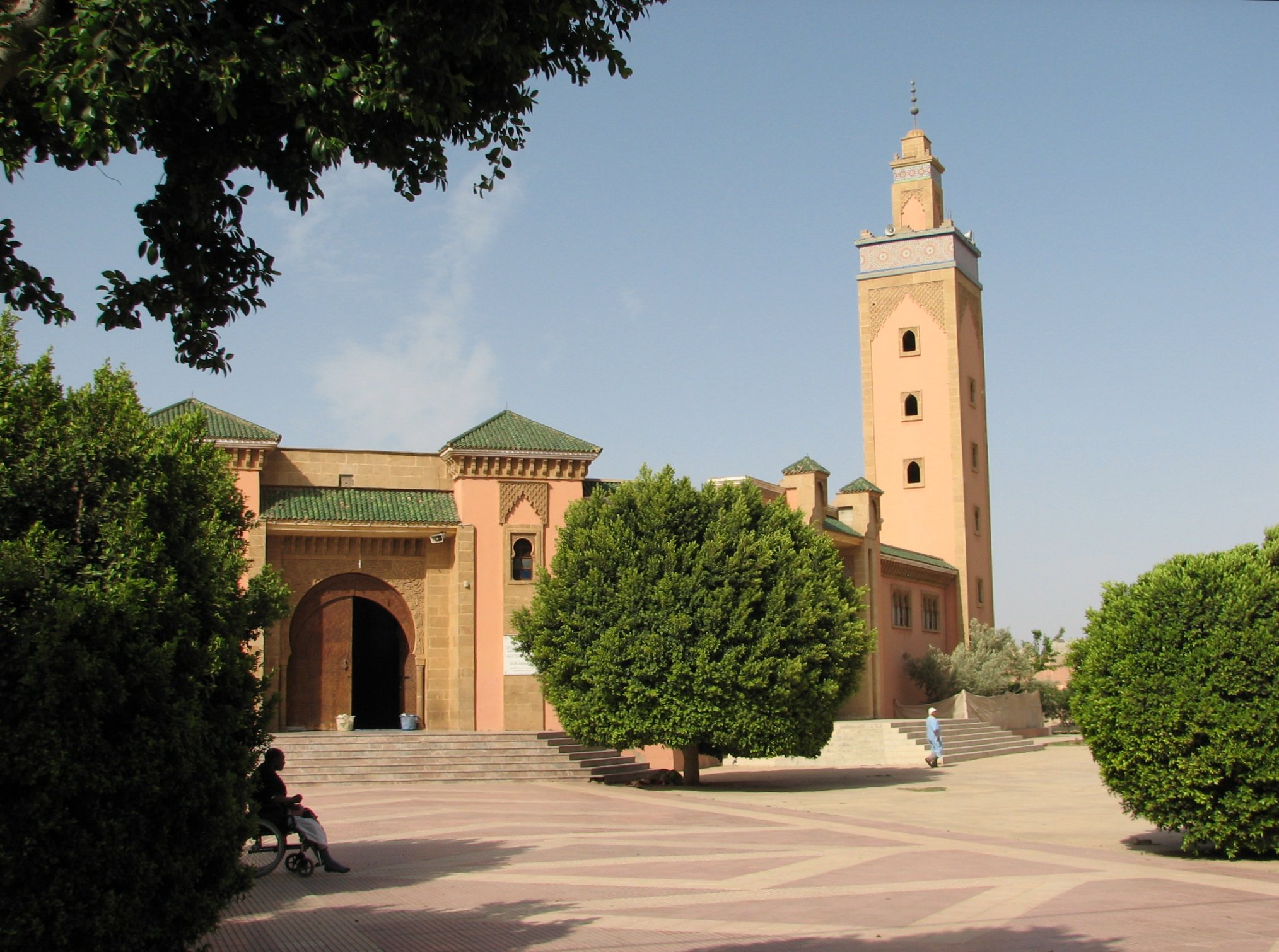
Muhammad al-Jazuli mosque
