= Tororo Steel Mill =

Ugandan company that manufactures steel

Coordinates: 00°33′32″N 34°05′45″E

- Company type: Private
- Industry: Manufacture of Steel
- Founded: 2027 Expected
- Headquarters: Tororo, Uganda
- Key people: Narendra Raval; Executive Chairman
- Products: Steel
- Number of employees: 15,000+ (2027) Expected

Tororo Steel Mill (TSM), a Ugandan factory that is under construction, is planned to be the largest manufacturer of steel in East Africa and Central Africa, when completed in 2027. Owned by the Devki Group, a Kenyan conglomerate that manufacturers construction materials, the steel mill has planned production capacity of one million tons annually. Construction of Tororo Steel Mill is budgeted at US$500 million.

== Location ==
The factories of TSM are in the commumity called Kayoro in Osukuru sub-county, outside the town of Tororo, in Tororo District, in the Eastern Region of Uganda. Kayoro lies approximately 27 kilometres (17 mi) southwest of downtown Tororo, off the Tororo-Kampala Road. This is approximately 211 kilometres (131 mi), by road, east of Kampala, the capital and largest city of Uganda.

== Overview ==
The steel mill is under construction, by the Devki Group of Companies, an industrial conglomerate based in Kenya, with subsidiaries in Kenya, Uganda, Rwanda and the Democratic Republic of the Congo (DRC). The conglomerate is led by its Executive Chairman, industrialist and philanthropist, Narendra Raval.

The steel plant plans to use as raw material, the vast iron ore deposits in Uganda estimated at over 500 million tons in the districts of Kabale, Rubanda, Kisoro and Tororo. Using "blast technology", the factory plans to manufacture 1,000,000 tons of steel products annually starting in the fourth quarter of 2027.

== Operations ==
The steel mill in Tororo, is part of a larger operation that includes the establishment of iron ore mines in the southwestern Ugandan districts of Kabale, Kisoro and Rubanda and construction of an iron ore smelter in Kabale. The purified iron ore will then be transported by road and later by standard gauge railway to the steel factory in Tororo. The steel produced at the factory is intended to meet Uganda's steel needs and the rest will be exported.

== Ownership ==
The steel plant is 100 percent owned by the Devki Group of Companies.

== See also ==
- Simba Cement Uganda Limited
