= Belfaa =

- Rural commune and town
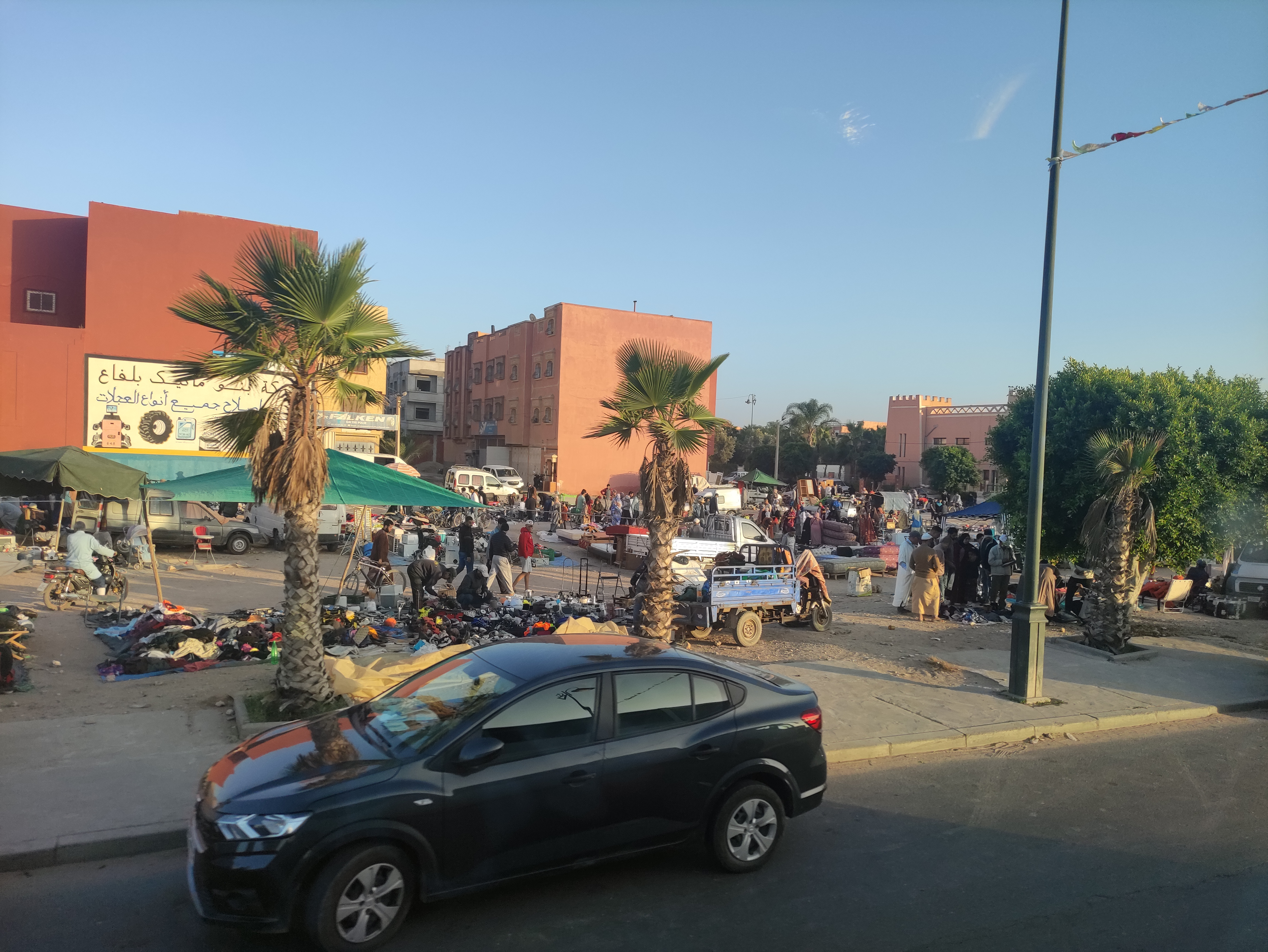
- Interactive map of Belfaa
- Coordinates: 30.031389°N 9.554167°W
- Country: Morocco
- Region: Souss-Massa
- Province: Chtouka Aït Baha Province

Population (2004)
  - Total: 22,406
- Time zone: UTC+0 (GMT)

Belfaa is a small town and rural commune in Chtouka-Aït Baha Province of the Souss-Massa-Drâa region of Morocco. At the time of the 2004 census, the commune had a total population of 22406 people living in 4370 households.
