= Nagojje =

- Location in Uganda
- Coordinates: 00°26′29″N 32°53′00″E
- Country: Uganda
- Region: Central Uganda
- District: Mukono District
- Elevation: 3,710 ft (1,130 m)

Nagojje is a town in the Buganda Region of Uganda. It is a municipality in Mukono District.

== Location ==
Nagojje is located in a rural area, approximately 13 kilometres (8 mi), by road, north-east of Namataba (which lies along the Kampala-Jinja Highway). This is about 17 kilometres (11 mi), by road south-east of Nakifuma, where the sub-county headquarters are located.

The town of Mukono, the location of the district headquarters, is located approximately 25 kilometres (16 mi), by road, southwest of Nagojje. The coordinates of Nagojje are 0°26'29.0"N, 32°53'00.0"E (Latitude:0.441389; Longitude:32.883333). Nagojje's average elevation is 1,130 metres (3,707 ft), above sea level.

== Points of interest ==
Nagojje is surrounded by a rural area where the main economic activity is agriculture. The main crop that is grown in the area is the cultivation of coffee. Both the Robusta and the more disease-resistant clonal variety are grown in the Nagojje neighborhood.

== See also ==
- Lugazi
- Kayunga
- List of cities and towns in Uganda
