= Moroto Cement Limited =

Cement manufacturer in Uganda

- Company type: Private
- Industry: Manufacture of Construction Materials
- Founded: 2012
- Headquarters: Moroto, Uganda
- Key people: Raza Ghulam; Chairman; Michael Mawanda Muranga; Executive Director
- Products: Cement

Moroto Cement Limited (MCL), whose full name is Moroto Cement Industries Limited, is a manufacturer of cement in Uganda with approximately 3000 tonnes per day clinker capacity.

== Location ==
It was expected that when construction would be completed in 2013, the main factories of the company would be located in Lorukumoi Village, in Rupa Sub-county, in Moroto District, Karamoja sub-region, in Northeastern Uganda. This location lies near the town of Moroto, approximately 460 kilometres (286 mi), by road, northeast of Kampala, the capital of Uganda and the largest city in that country. This location lies approximately 313 kilometres (194 mi), by road, east of the city of Gulu, the largest urban center in Northern Uganda.

== Overview ==
With an estimated production capacity of 1,000,000 metric tonnes annually, Moroto Cement Limited is expected to be one of the largest manufacturers of cement in Uganda, accounting for about 34 percent of annual national output. Tororo Cement Limited, accounts for another 34 percent.

Hima Cement Limited, which produces an estimated 850,000 metric tonnes annually, accounts for the remaining 32 percent. The bulk of MCL's output is expected to go towards the construction of Karuma Power Station, the largest hydro-power station ever undertaken in Uganda's history. As of November 2013, production capacity at the factory in Moroto was estimated at 3,000 metric tonnes daily.

== History ==
The company was established in 2012. It has carried out feasibility studies on limestone deposits in Moroto District, finding sufficient quantities to last 100 years at maximum production capacity. Construction of the main factory was expected to begin in late 2012 and last approximately one year. Commercial production of cement was expected to begin soon after the factory was commissioned. Start-up costs were estimated at UGX:1 trillion (about US$400 million at that time).

== Cancellation of license ==
In March 2017, the Uganda Radio Network, a news agency, reported that the Directorate of Geological Survey and Mines in the Uganda Ministry of Energy and Mineral Development had cancelled the mining license of Moroto Cement Industries Limited, the owner/developers of this project. The reason for the cancellation was given as "failure to start development", four years after being awarded a licence.

== See also ==
- Tororo Cement Limited
- Hima Cement Limited
