= Tororo General Hospital =

Ugandan public hospital

- Location within Uganda

Geography
- Location: Tororo, Tororo District, Eastern Region, Uganda
- Coordinates: 00°41′39″N 34°11′13″E

Organisation
- Care system: Public
- Type: General

Services
- Beds: 200

History
- Founded: 1940

Links
- Other links: Hospitals in Uganda

Tororo General Hospital, also Tororo Government Hospital, Tororo District Hospital or Tororo Main Hospital, is a hospital in Uganda.

== Location ==
The hospital is located in the central business district of the town of Tororo, in Tororo District, in the Eastern Region of the country, approximately 46 kilometres (29 mi), south of Mbale Regional Referral Hospital. This location is approximately 132 kilometres (82 mi), by road, east of Jinja Regional Referral Hospital. The coordinates of the hospital are: 0°41'39.0"N, 34°11'13.0"E (Latitude:0.694167; Longitude:34.186944).

== Overview ==
Tororo General Hospital is a public hospital owned by the Uganda Government and administered by the Uganda Ministry of Health. The hospital serves the general public despite severe challenges, including poor funding, corruption, inadequate staffing, poor remuneration, insufficient medication and antiquated medical equipment.

A study carried out in 2019, using data collected in 2014, that was published in 2020, identified seven conditions associated with still births (after the 24th week of pregnancy) and neonatal deaths (from age zero to 28 days). The top seven conditions at Tororo General Hospital are: 1. Prematurity of the baby 2. Breech presentation 3. Multiple gestation 4. Cesarean delivery 5. Low birth weight 6. Antepartum hemorrhage and 7.Cord prolapse. The rate of perinatal death at this hospital was higher than Uganda's national targets. The "calculated stillbirth rate was 26.3 per 1000 total deliveries, and the neonatal death rate of 8.9 per 1000 live deliveries".

== See also ==
- List of hospitals in Uganda
