= Sidi Bibi =

Sidi Bibi سيدي بيبي
- Rural commune and town
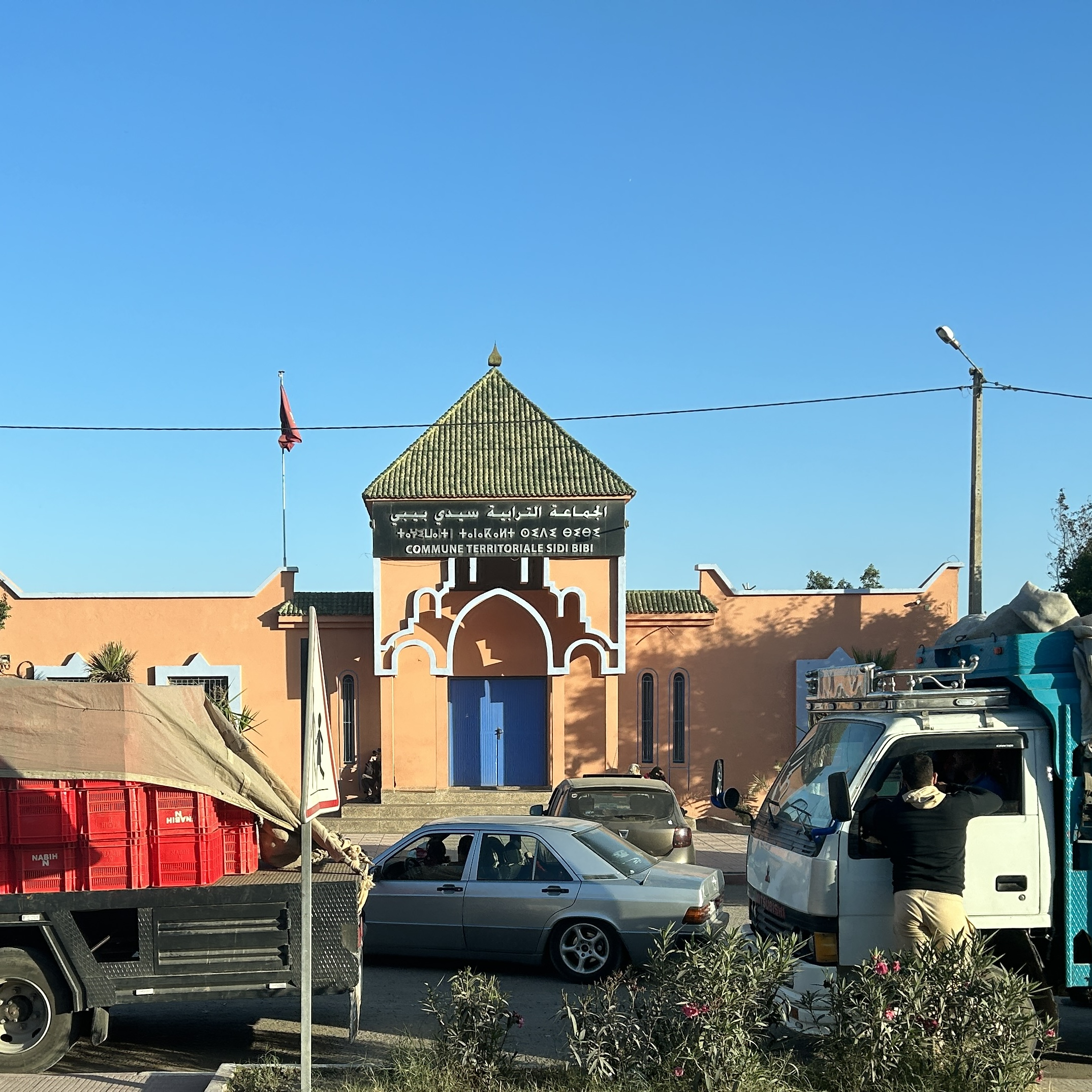

- Location within Morocco
- Coordinates: 30°14′N 9°32′W
- Country: Morocco
- Region: Souss-Massa
- Province: Chtouka-Aït Baha Province

Population (2014)
  - Total: 23,909
- Time zone: UTC+0 (GMT)

Sidi Bibi is a town and rural commune in Chtouka-Aït Baha Province of the Souss-Massa region of Morocco. At the time of the 2014 census, the commune had a total population of 23,909 people living in 5,108 households.
