= Kampala Cement Company Limited =

Ugandan company

Coordinates: 00°23′11″N 32°51′13″E

- Type: Private
- Industry: Manufacture of construction materials
- Founded: September 1, 2015; 10 years ago
- Headquarters: Namataba, Uganda
- Key people: MacDosman Kabega; Co-Owner; Bob Baryaw; Managing Director & CEO
- Products: Cement
- Total assets: €110 million (2016)
- Number of employees: 450+ (2016)
- Website: http://www.kampalacement.com

The Kampala Cement Company Limited (KCCL) is a manufacturer of cement in Uganda.

== Location ==
The main factory and headquarters of the company are located in Namataba on the Kampala–Jinja Highway, approximately 40 kilometres (25 mi) east of Kampala, the capital and largest city of Uganda. The facility sits on the eastern bank of the Sezibwa River at coordinates: 0°23'11.0"N, 32°51'13.0"E (Latitude:0°23'11.0"N; Longitude:32°51'13.0"E).

== Ownership ==
KCCL is a wholly owned subsidiary of Multiple Industries Limited, an industrial conglomerate involved in the manufacture and marketing of building materials, including metal bars, plumbing pipes, rainwater gutters, plastic pipes, and cement.

== See also ==
- List of cement manufacturers in Uganda
- List of companies and cities in Africa that manufacture cement
