= Tanalt =

- Rural commune and town
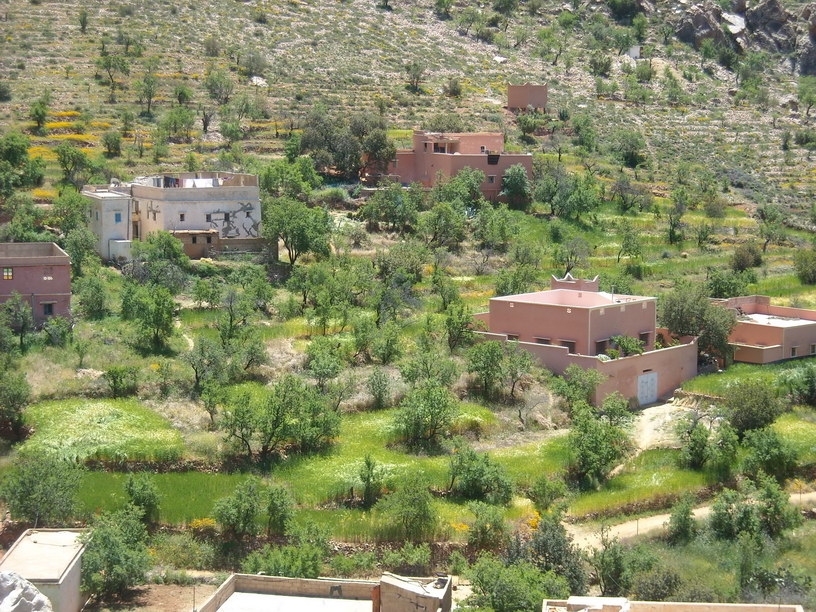
- Interactive map of Tanalt
- Coordinates: 29°46′24″N 9°10′10″W
- Country: Morocco
- Region: Souss-Massa-Drâa
- Province: Chtouka-Aït Baha Province
- Time zone: UTC+0 (GMT)

Tanalt is a village located in Chtouka-Aït Baha Province of the Souss-Massa region of Morocco.

Along with the town of Tafraout, Tanalt is one of two places in southern Morocco where Lupinus atlanticus is found.
