= Ait Baha =

Coordinates: 30.07°N 9.155°W

Ait Baha آيت باها ⴰⵢⵜ ⴱⴰⵀⴰ
- Town
- Interactive map of Ait Baha
- Country: Morocco
- Region: Souss-Massa
- Province: Chtouka Aït Baha Province

Population (2004)
  - Total: 4,767
- Time zone: UTC+0 (GMT)

Ait Baha (in Tifinagh : ⴰⵢⵜ ⴱⴰⵀⴰ) is a town in Chtouka Aït Baha Province, Souss-Massa, Morocco. According to the 2004 census it has a population of 4,767.
