= Hilala =

Hilala ⵀⵉⵍⴰⵍⴰ (Standard Moroccan Berber) هلالة (Arabic)
- Rural commune and town
- Location within Morocco
- Coordinates: 30.05265°N 8.99073°W
- Country: Morocco
- Region: Souss-Massa
- Province: Chtouka-Aït Baha

Population (2004)
  - Total: 3,831
- Time zone: UTC+0 (GMT)

Hilala is a small town and rural commune in Chtouka-Aït Baha Province of the Souss-Massa region of Morocco. At the time of the 2004 census, the commune had a total population of 3831 people living in 734 households.
