= Ait Amira =

Ait Amira آيت عميرة
- Rural commune and town
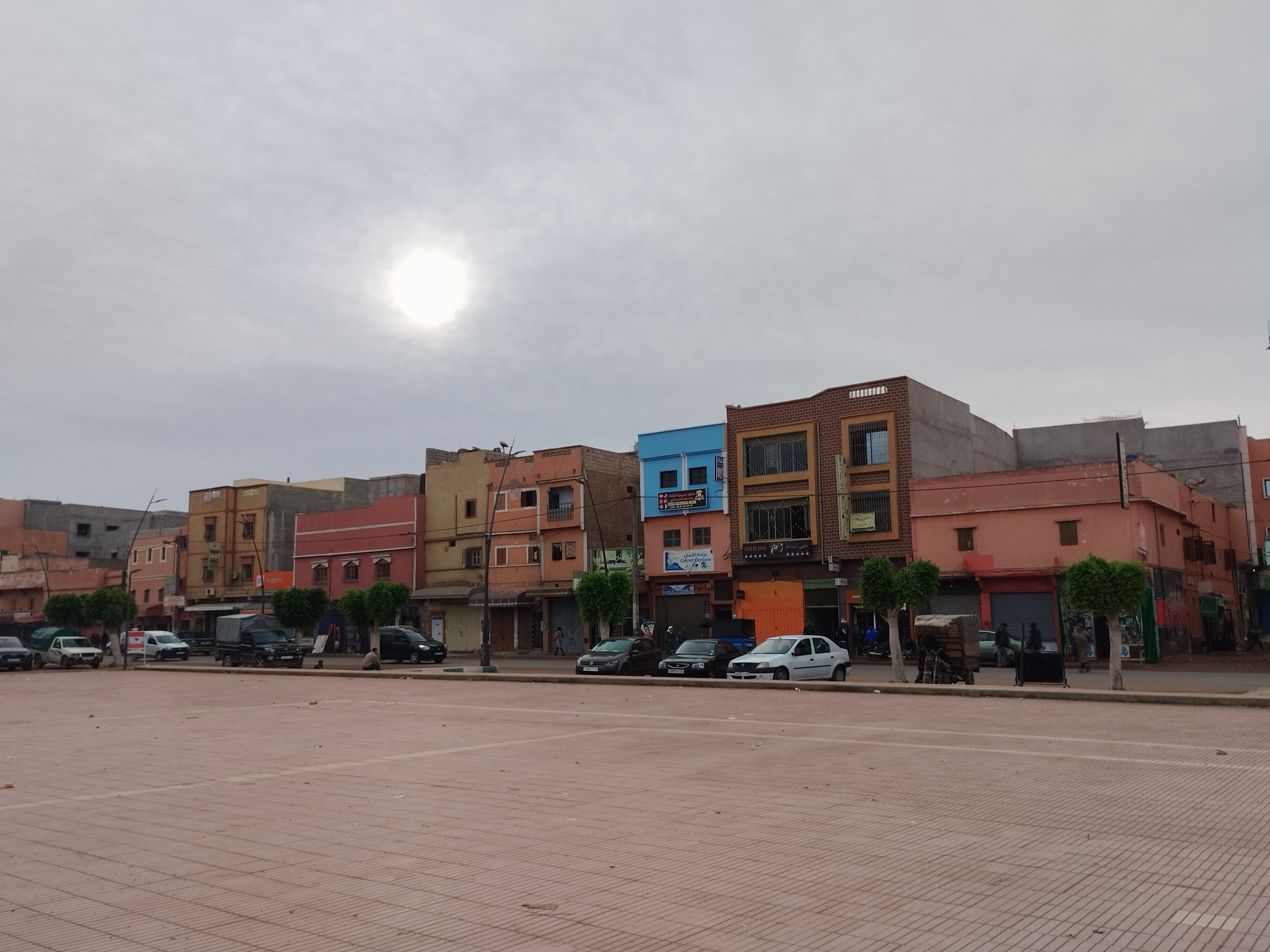
- Interactive map of Ait Amira
- Country: Morocco
- Region: Souss-Massa
- Province: Chtouka-Aït Baha

Government
  - Mayor: Ali El Berhichi (Istiqlal)

Population (2004)
  - Total: 47,458
- Time zone: UTC+0 (GMT)

Ait Amira (Arabic: آيت عميرة) is a town and rural commune in the Chtouka-Aït Baha Province of the Souss-Massa region of Morocco. It is located about 20 kilometers southeast of the city of Agadir.
