= Arabian Cement Co. =

- Company type: Public
- Industry: Cement
- Founded: 1988
- Headquarters: Khoms, Libya
- Key people: Mohammed Ali Sakkah (Chairman); Moustafa Al Tafouh (General Manager, Technical and Production); Jouma Hundar (GM)
- Products: Construction; Ready-mix concrete Gypsum; Lime
- Number of employees: 3,000
- Website: http://www.acclibya.com

The Arabian Cement Co. (ACC) is a Libyan company involved in production of cement, lime, gypsum and paper bags for cement packaging, and other construction related operations. It has a total production capacity of roughly 3.340 million tons per year (t/yr) and currently operates seven plants throughout Libya. The company's investment volume was estimated at Ld 180 million.

== Background ==
Nationally, the cement sector in Libya is not a major economic actor. Nevertheless, on a sectoral level, the impact of the production of cement on the natural and social environment in Libya is important. ACC was formed as a state-owned company in 1988, resulting from a merger between the National Cement & Building Materials Establishment and the Souk El Khamis General Cement & Building Materials Corporation. Since then, cement manufacture in Libya has been the sole domain of two parastatals; the ACC and the Libyan Cement Co. In 1998, ACC operated four plants: El Mergeb with a 330,000-t/yr capacity, and Souk, El Khamis, and Lebda each with a 1-M/yr capacity. Production from the two companies satisfied most domestic demand, and minimal surplus was available for export; on average, capacity utilization was 50%. In 2001, the Libyan Government proposed a number of state company projects for which joint ventures would be considered. These included an expansion of ACC's cement plants in Libda and Zliten, valued at $242 million and $169 million respectively.

In February 2005, the initial public offering of shares in the formerly state-owned ACC resulted in the sale of 60% of the company for $273 million. Later that year, ACC proposed to build a second 1-Mt/yr-capacity cement production line at its Zliten plant.

It was the country's first IPO and the biggest sale of a government-owned business as Col. Muammar el-Qaddafi's government began stepping up efforts to attract private investment and open the economy after the lifting of international sanctions on Libya in 2004.

== See also ==
- Libyan Cement Company
- Libyan Iron and Steel Company
