= Sidi Boushab =

Sidi Bousshab سيدي بوسحاب
- Rural commune and town
- Location within Morocco
- Coordinates: 30.074°N 9.279°W
- Country: Morocco
- Region: Souss-Massa
- Province: Chtouka-Aït Baha

Population (2004)
  - Total: 10,438
- Time zone: UTC+0 (GMT)

Sidi Boushab is a small town and rural commune in Chtouka-Aït Baha Province of the Souss-Massa region of Morocco. At the time of the 2004 census, the commune had a total population of 10,438 people living in 1882 households.
