= Ait Milk =

Rural community and town in Souss-Massa, Morocco

Ait Milk ⴰⵢⵜ ⵎⵉⵍⴽ Sebt Ait Milk
- Rural community and town
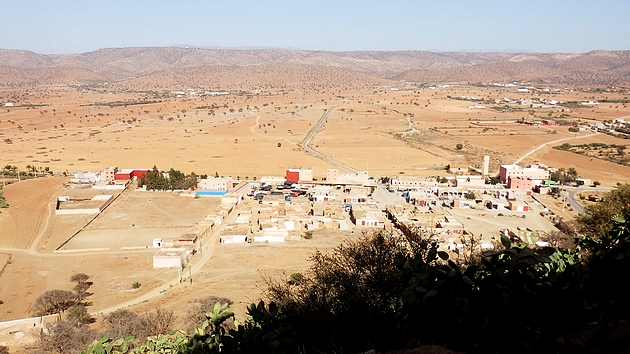

- Location within Morocco
- Coordinates: 29°57′03″N 9°23′15″W
- Country: Morocco
- Region: Souss-Massa
- Province: Chtouka-Aït Baha Province

Population (2014)
  - Total: 10,277
- Time zone: UTC+0 (GMT)

Ait Milk is a small town and rural community in Chtouka-Aït Baha Province of the Souss-Massa region of Morocco.

== Demographics ==
At the time of the 2004 census, the community had a total population of 11414 people living in 2112 households. In 2014, the total population has decreased to reach 10277.
