= List of cement manufacturers in Kenya =

This is a list of companies that manufacture cement in Kenya.

== Production ==
The table below illustrates the rankings of Kenya's cement manufacturers, based on annual production figures, as of December 2016.

Market share rankings of Kenya's cement companies
Rank	Company	Market share
1	Bamburi Cement Limited	32.6
2	Mombasa Cement Ltd (MCL)	15.8
3	East Africa Portland Cement Company	15.1
4	Savannah Cement Limited	15.0
5	ARM Cement Limited	13.5
6	National Cement Company Limited	08.0
	Total	100.00

As of December 2016, Kenya's total annual cement production was 6.7 million tonnes, with national consumption of 6.3 million tonnes. The surplus production was aggressively marketed to regional neighbours.

== See also ==
- List of cement manufacturers in Tanzania
- List of cement manufacturers in Uganda
- List of companies and cities in Africa that manufacture cement
