= Imi Mqourn =

- Rural commune and town
- Location within Morocco
- Coordinates: 30.1675°N 9.232222°W
- Country: Morocco
- Region: Souss-Massa-Drâa
- Province: Chtouka-Aït Baha Province

Population (2004)
  - Total: 11,748
- Time zone: UTC+0 (GMT)

Imi Mqourn is a small town and rural commune in Chtouka-Aït Baha Province of the Souss-Massa-Drâa region of Morocco. At the time of the 2004 census, the commune had a total population of 11748 people living in 2093 households.
