= Targua Ntouchka =

- Rural commune and town
- Location within Morocco
- Coordinates: 29.886667°N 9.204444°W
- Country: Morocco
- Region: Souss-Massa-Drâa
- Province: Chtouka-Aït Baha Province

Population (2004)
  - Total: 6,552
- Time zone: UTC+0 (GMT)

Targua Ntouchka is a small town and rural commune in Chtouka-Aït Baha Province of the Souss-Massa-Drâa region of Morocco. At the time of the 2004 census, the commune had a total population of 7552 people living in 1244 households.
