= Inchaden =

- Rural commune and town
- Location within Morocco
- Coordinates: 30.105°N 9.564167°W
- Country: Morocco
- Region: Souss-Massa-Drâa
- Province: Chtouka-Aït Baha Province

Population (2004)
  - Total: 21,542
- Time zone: UTC+0 (GMT)

Inchaden is a small town and rural commune in Chtouka-Aït Baha Province of the Souss-Massa-Drâa region of Morocco. At the time of the 2004 census, the commune had a total population of 21542 people.
