= Ida Ougnidif =

Ida Ougnidif ⵉⴷⴰ ⵡⴽⵏⵟⵉⴼ (Standard Moroccan Berber) إداوكنظيف (Arabic)
- Rural commune and town
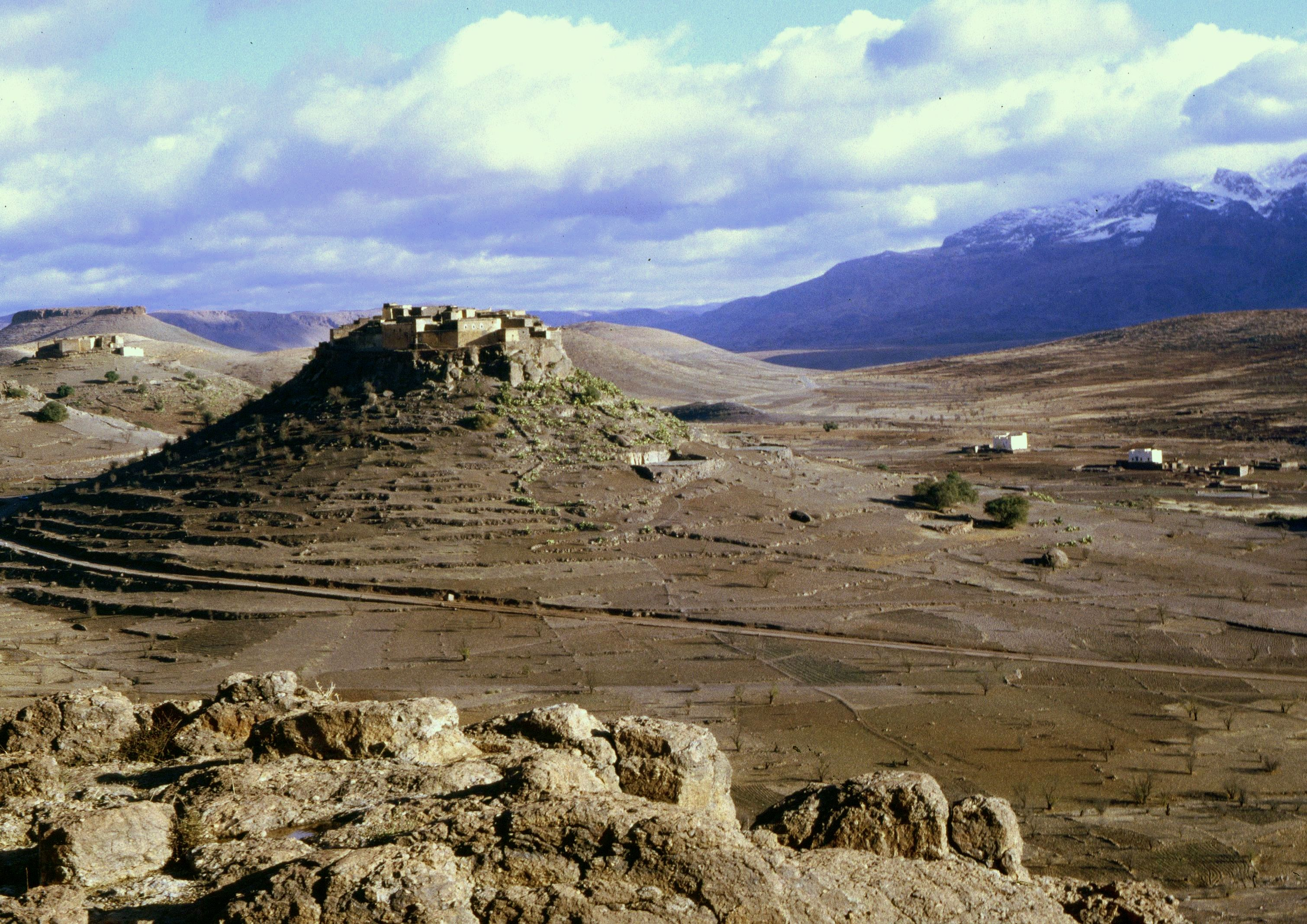

- Location within Morocco
- Coordinates: 29.861667°N 9.007778°W
- Country: Morocco
- Region: Souss-Massa-Drâa
- Province: Chtouka-Aït Baha Province

Population (2004)
  - Total: 3,151
- Time zone: UTC+0 (GMT)

Ida Ougnidif is a small town and rural commune in Chtouka-Aït Baha Province of the Souss-Massa-Drâa region of Morocco. At the time of the 2004 census, the commune had a total population of 3151 people living in 864 households.
