= Sidi Abdallah El Bouchouari =

Sidi Abdallah El Bouchouari سيدي عبد الله البوشواري
- Rural commune and town
- Location within Morocco
- Coordinates: 29.964722°N 9.278333°W
- Country: Morocco
- Region: Souss-Massa-Drâa
- Province: Chtouka-Aït Baha Province

Population (2004)
  - Total: 9,068
- Time zone: UTC+0 (GMT)

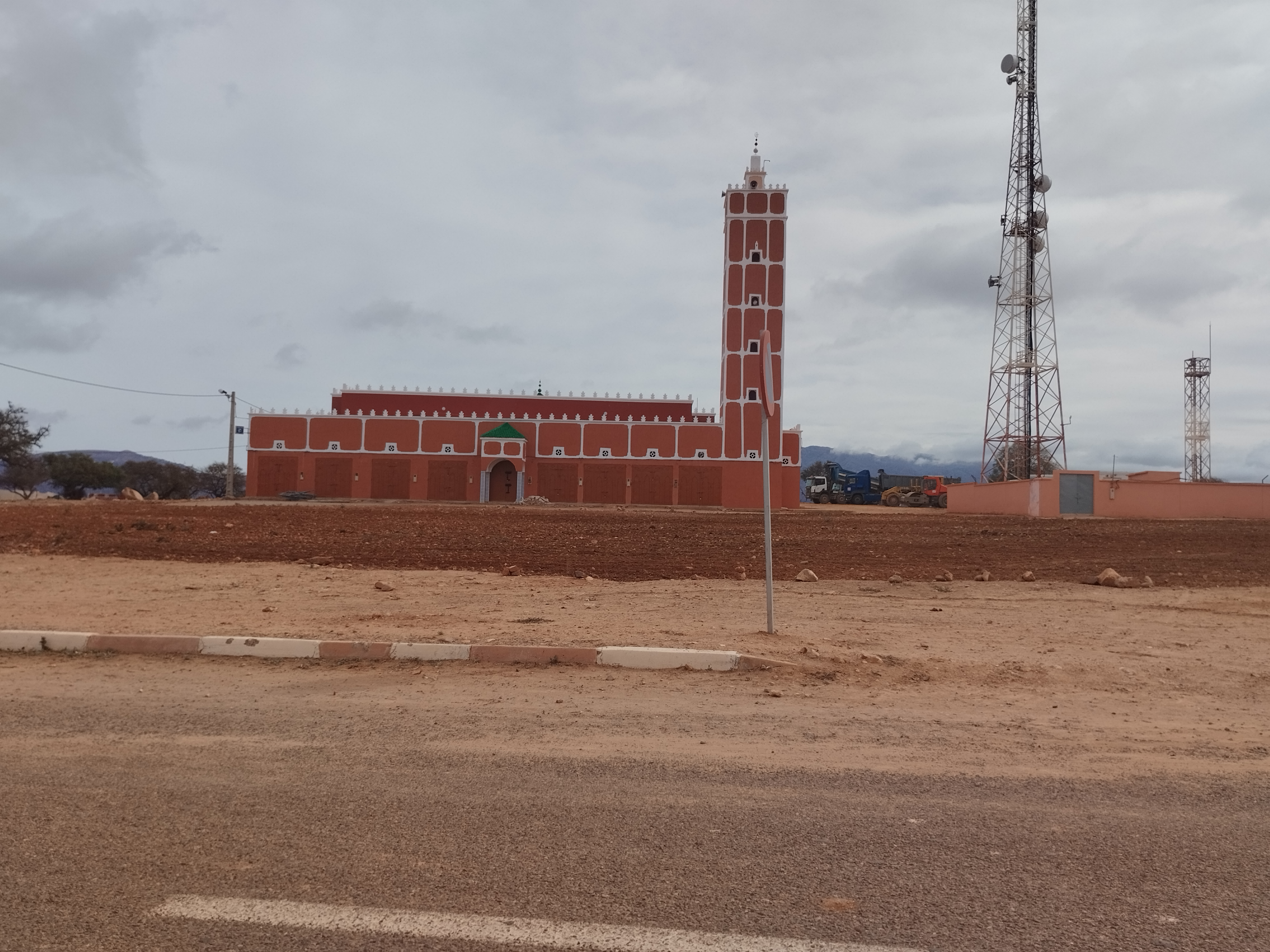
Mosque in Sidi Abdallah El Bouchouari commune

Sidi Abdallah El Bouchouari is a small town and rural commune in Chtouka-Aït Baha Province of the Souss-Massa-Drâa region of Morocco. At the time of the 2004 census, the commune had a total population of 9068 people living in 1713 households.
