= Ait Ouadrim =

Ait Ouadrim ⴰⵢⵜ ⵡⴰⴷⵔⵉⵎ / أيت وادريم
- Rural commune and town
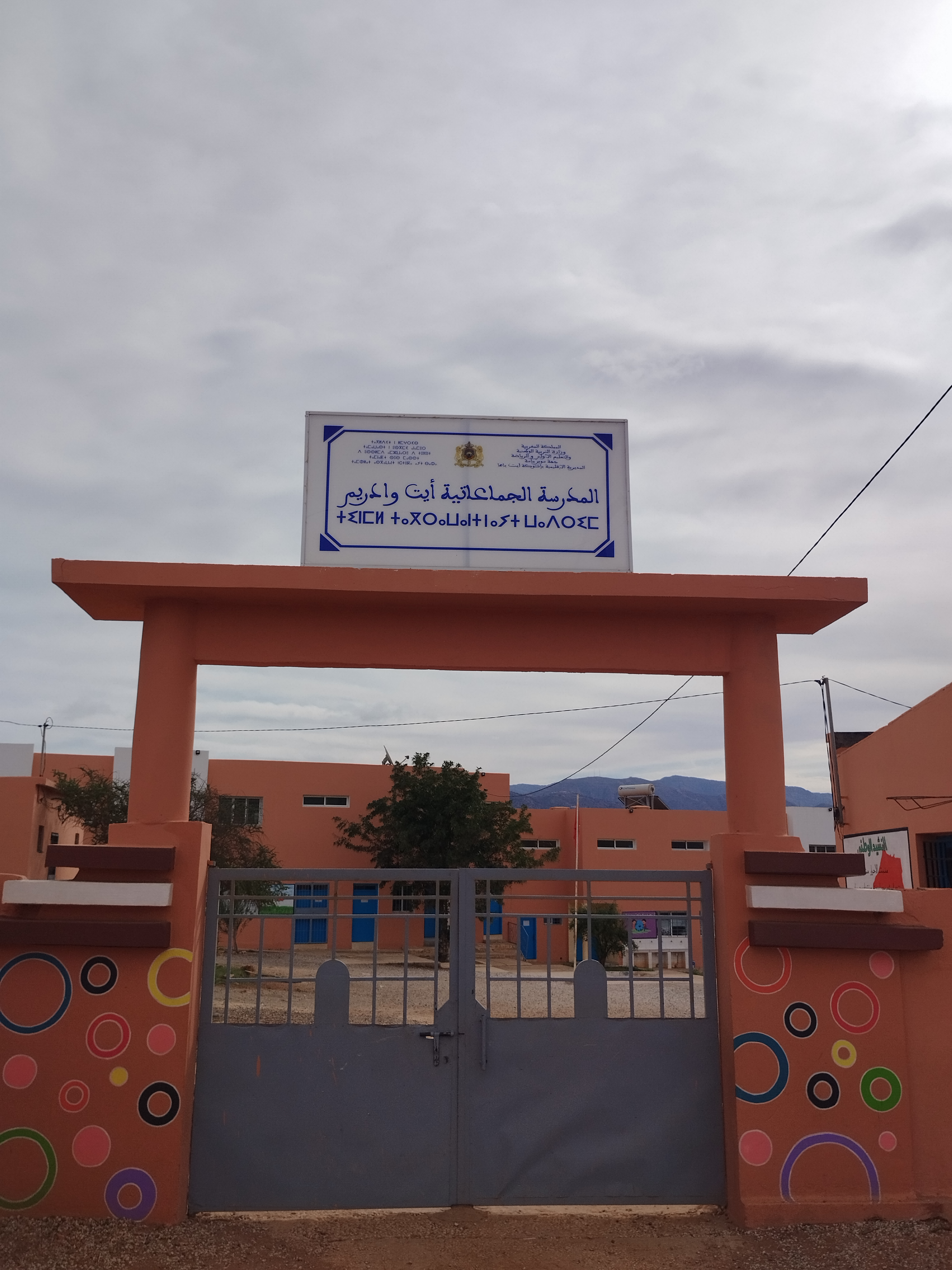
- A community school in Ait Ouadrim

- Location within Morocco
- Coordinates: 30.029722°N 9.247778°W
- Country: Morocco
- Region: Souss-Massa-Drâa
- Province: Chtouka-Aït Baha Province

Population (2004)
  - Total: 7,366
- Time zone: UTC+0 (GMT)

Ait Ouadrim is a small town and rural commune in Chtouka-Aït Baha Province of the Souss-Massa-Drâa region of Morocco. At the time of the 2004 census, the commune had a total population of 7,366 people living in 1,438 households.
