= Ait Mzal =

Ait Mzal ⴰⵢⵜ ⵎⵣⴰⵍ / أيت مزال
- Rural commune and town
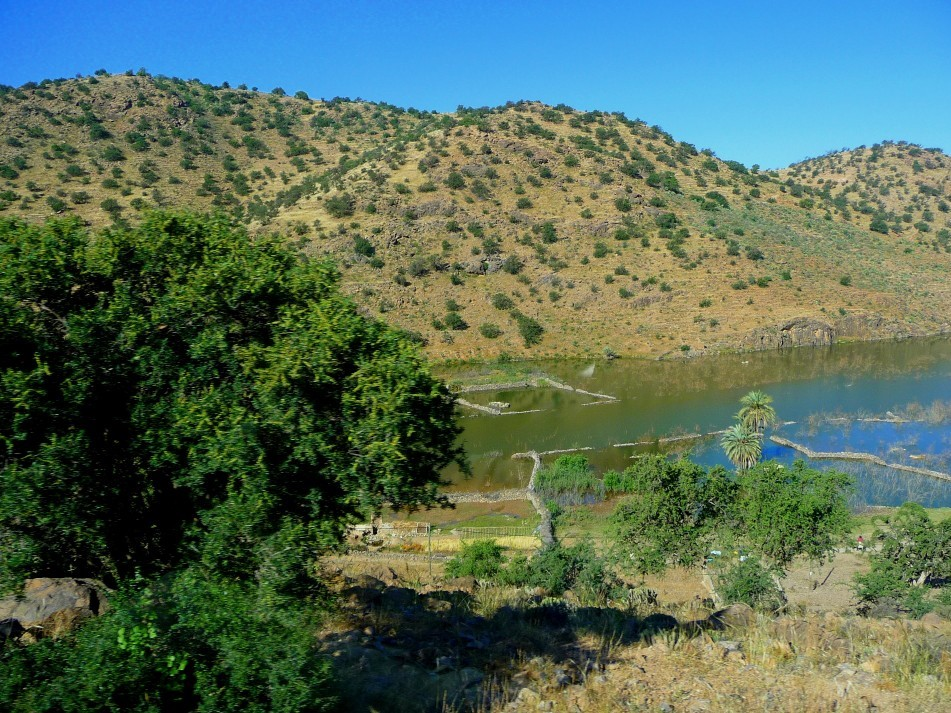
- Ait Mzal Lake

- Location within Morocco
- Coordinates: 30°17′N 9°07′W
- Country: Morocco
- Region: Souss-Massa-Drâa
- Province: Chtouka-Aït Baha Province

Population (2004)
  - Total: 4,555
- Time zone: UTC+0 (GMT)

Ait Mzal is a small town and rural commune in Chtouka-Aït Baha Province of the Souss-Massa-Drâa region of Morocco. At the time of the 2004 census, the commune had a total population of 4,555 people living in 917 households.
