= Namataba =

- Location in Uganda
- Coordinates: 00°23′3.0″N 32°50′42.0″E
- Country: Uganda
- Region: Central Uganda
- District: Mukono District
- Elevation: 3,783 ft (1,153 m)

Namataba is a town in Mukono District, Central Uganda. The town is an urban center under Mukono District Administration.

== Location ==
Namataba is located approximately 12 kilometres (7.5 mi), by road, northeast of Mukono, the location of the district headquarters. This location lies along the Kampala-Jinja Highway, approximately 33 kilometres (21 mi), by road, east of Kampala, the capital of Uganda and the largest city in that country. The coordinates of Namataba are:0°23'03.0"N, 32°50'42.0"E (Latitude:0.384167; Longitude:32.845000). The town is located at an average altitude of 1,153 metres (3,783 ft), above sea level.

== Overview ==
Namataba is an urban center in Mukono District. The town is administered by Namataba Town Council, an urban local government within Mukono District Administration. Other urban centers in the district include: Mukono, Kalagi, Nakifuma, Kasawo, Nagojje and Katosi.

== Points of interest ==
Namataba is governed by Namataba Town Council. The town has a central market where one can procure fresh produce every day of the week. The Kampala-Jinja Highway passes through the center of town in an east to west direction. The town is the location of the Uganda campus of Limkokwing University of Creative Technology, based in Cyberjaya, Selangor, Malaysia. The university took over space, formerly occupied by Namataba Technical Institute.

Namataba is also home to Kampala Cement Company Limited, a cement-manufacturing company with capacity of about 1 million tonnes annually. Some of the cement manufactured here, was used in the construction of Karuma Hydroelectric Power Station and in other national infrastructure developments.

== See also ==
- Mukono
- Mukono District
- Central Region, Uganda
