= Tassegdelt =

- Rural commune and town
- Location within Morocco
- Coordinates: 30.087778°N 9.088333°W
- Country: Morocco
- Region: Souss-Massa-Drâa
- Province: Chtouka-Aït Baha Province

Population (2004)
  - Total: 6,526
- Time zone: UTC+0 (GMT)

Tassegdelt is a small town and rural commune in Chtouka-Aït Baha Province of the Souss-Massa-Drâa region of Morocco. At the time of the 2004 census, the commune had a total population of 6526 people living in 1168 households.
