= Tizi Ntakoucht =

- Rural commune and town
- Location within Morocco
- Coordinates: 29.958056°N 9.111944°W
- Country: Morocco
- Region: Souss-Massa-Drâa
- Province: Chtouka-Aït Baha Province

Population (2004)
  - Total: 1,951
- Time zone: UTC+0 (GMT)

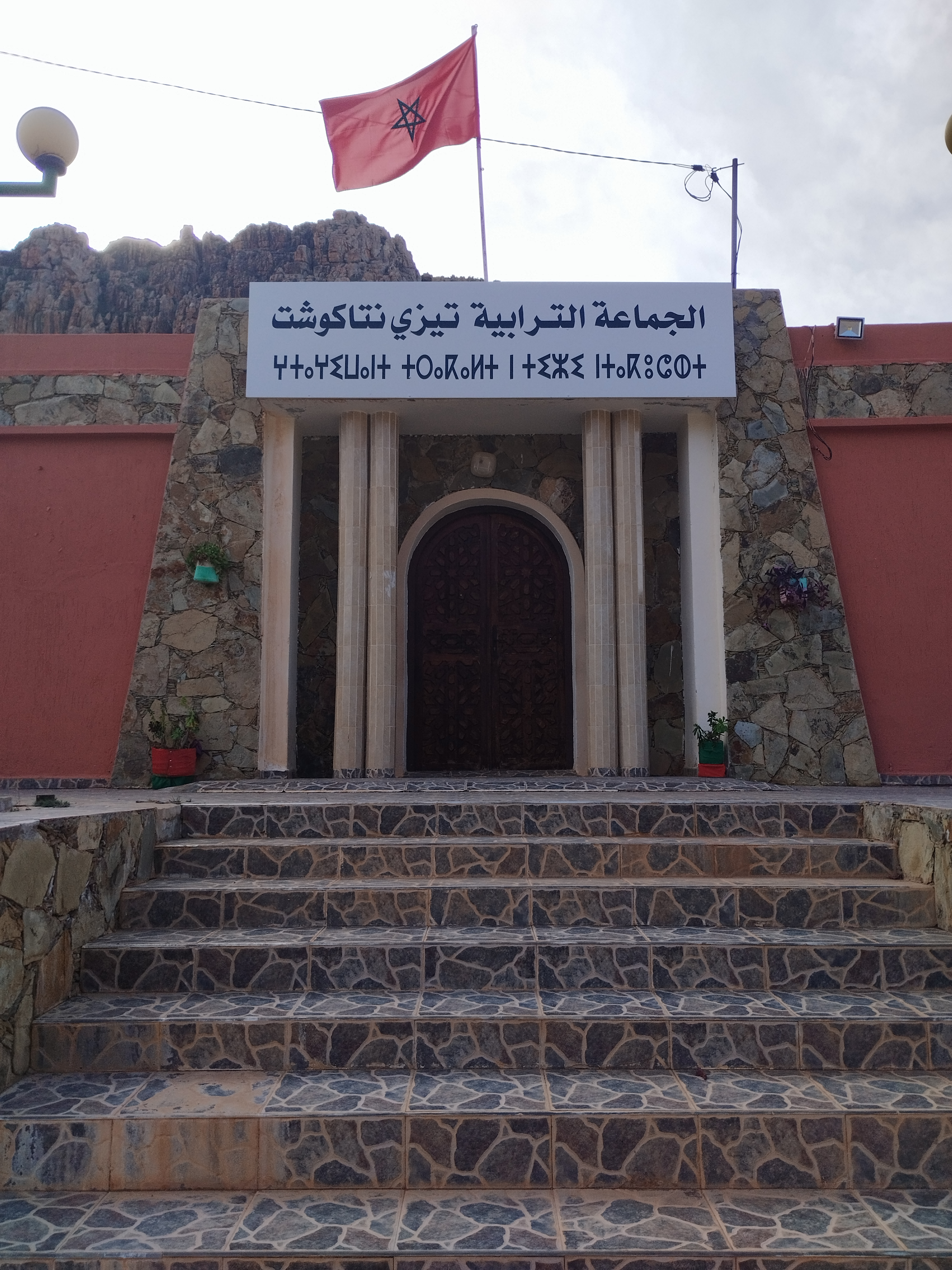
Entrance to the Tizi Ntakoucht Commune building

Tizi Ntakoucht is a small town and rural commune in Chtouka-Aït Baha Province of the Souss-Massa-Drâa region of Morocco. At the time of the 2004 census, the commune had a total population of 1951 people living in 484 households.
