= Rajan Mahtani =

Zambian business magnate (born 1948)

Rajan Mahtani (born 14 February 1948) is a Zambian business magnate who is Chairman of Finance Bank Zambia Limited, a medium-sized banking unit in Zambia. He pursued a career in Finance and Law. He is a Fellow of the Chartered Association of Certified Accountants and holds a PhD in Commercial Law from the London Institute of Business Studies.

On 13 April 2015, Mahtani agreed to surrender his claim over the Zambezi Portland Cement Factory, which its minority shareholder 'the Ventriglias' had taken over by force on 7 April 2015. The surrender was made with a view to safeguard the interest of the existing employees working at the Zambezi Portland Cement Factory.

== Win at the Malawi High Court in 2015 ==
On July 28, 2015, the Malawi High Court passed a judgement in favor of Dr. Rajan Mahtani where it was witnessed that Nyasa Times, had published defamatory content in the name of Dr. Mahtani. With no particular evidence and weak arguments from the side of Nyasa Times, the High Court Honored Dr. Rajan Mahtani with a win and Nyasa Times has been asked to take down all the defamatory content from its website along with paying a sum as compensation for the injury caused.

== Win at the Lusaka High Court in 2015 ==
As per The Post, on November 19, 2015, the Lusaka High Court Judge, Mwiinde Siavwapa passed a judgement where it was witnessed that a permanently closed cannot be reconsidered for a new judgement. The issue is connected to share forgery charges which the Ventriglia family has put on Dr. Rajan Mahtani with respect to Zambezi Portland Cement Factory. It was concluded that it was wrong on behalf of the acting Director of Public Prosecutions and Attorney General to support the arrest of the Former Finance Bank Chairman, Dr. Rajan Mahtani.

== Judgement ==
The decision which was made earlier in 2012, will stand as same and therefore, Mahtani cannot be questioned on the share forgery claim anymore.
