= Ouad Essafa =

Ouad Essafa وادي الصفاء
- Rural commune and town
- Location within Morocco
- Coordinates: 30.267222°N 9.371944°W
- Country: Morocco
- Region: Souss-Massa-Drâa
- Province: Chtouka-Aït Baha Province

Population (2004)
  - Total: 39,386
- Time zone: UTC+0 (GMT)

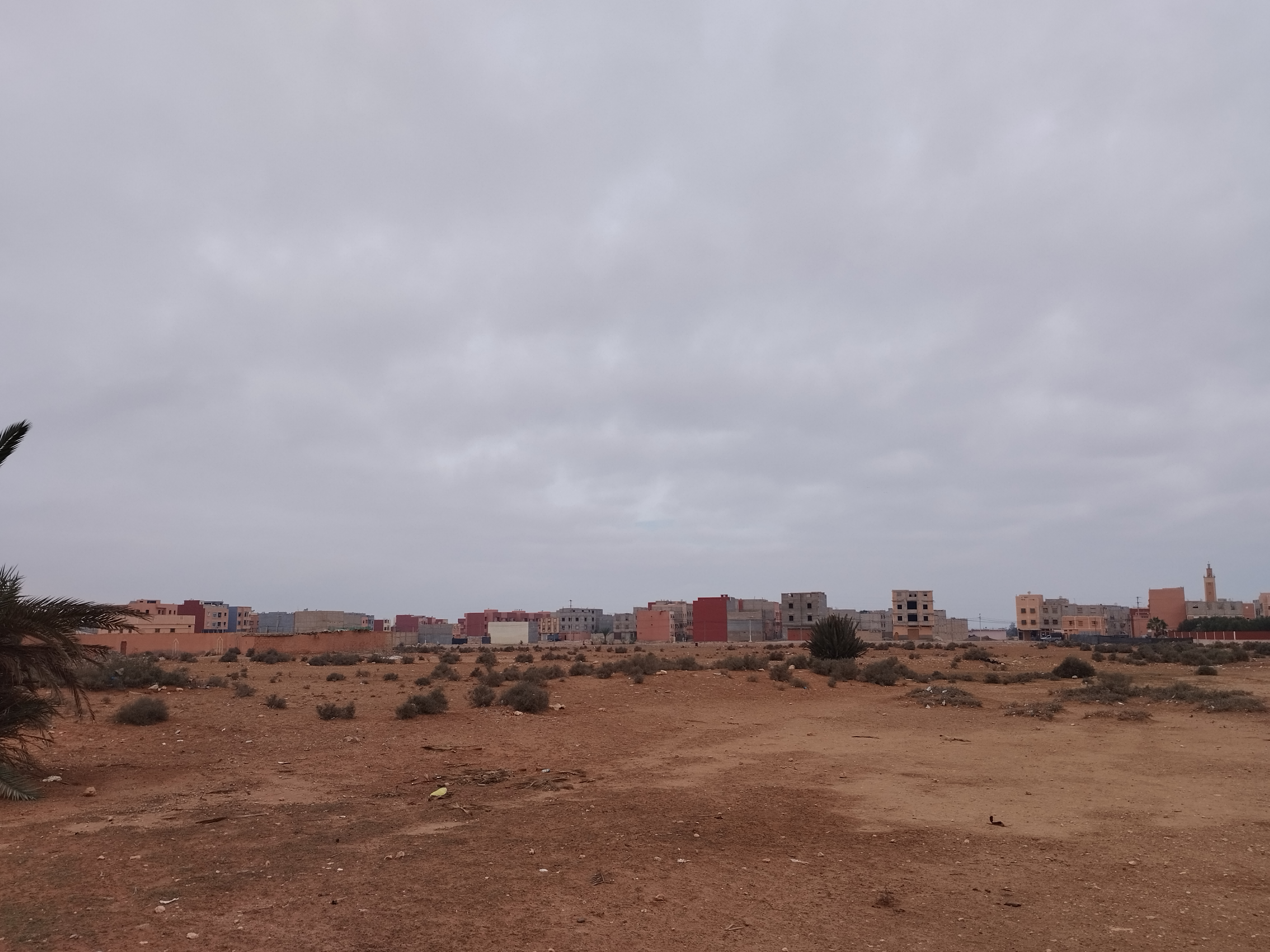
An overview of Ouad Essafa commune's areas

Ouad Essafa is a small town and rural commune in Chtouka-Aït Baha Province of the Souss-Massa-Drâa region of Morocco. At the time of the 2004 census, the commune had a total population of 39,386 people living in 7,796 households.
