= Narendra Raval =

Kenyan industrialist, entrepreneur and philanthropist

- Born: 1962 (age 63–64); India
- Citizenship: Kenyan
- Occupations: Industrialist, Entrepreneur, Philanthropist
- Years active: 1986 - present
- Known for: Philanthropy, Entrepreneurship
- Title: Executive Chairman of the Devki Group of Companies

Narendra Raval (born 1962) is a Kenyan industrialist, entrepreneur and philanthropist of Indian Gujarati origin. Raval serves as the executive chairman of the Devki Group of Companies, a conglomerate in East Africa that manufactures steel, aluminum and cement.

He is estimated to have a net worth of US$400 million as of 2015, ranking him as the 46th richest African, and 2nd richest Kenyan based on the 2015 Forbes list of Africa's richest in Kenya.

== Early life and education ==
Raval was born in India, c. 1962. He became a priest at the temple of the Lord Narnarayandev in Bhuj at age 11, while still in India. As a teenager, Raval came to Kenya to work as an assistant priest at a temple in Kisumu, western Kenya, on the shores of Lake Victoria. In 1986, he abandoned his priesthood, married a Kenyan woman and with his wife started trading in building materials, starting out in the open marketplace (Gikomba), in Nairobi.

== Career ==
=== Devki Group ===
Since 1986, Raval has built an industrial empire, known as the Devki Group of Companies, which manufactures building materials in various locations in Kenya. The group has also established subsidiaries in Uganda, Rwanda and in the Democratic Republic of the Congo. As of April 2021, the Devki Group have an annual manufacturing revenue of over US$650 million, employing over 6,500 people.

Raval's empire within Kenya spans steel, aluminium and cement manufacturing, with interests in aviation. Devki Group also owns a cement factory in the Ugandan border town of Tororo.

In March 2022, the Devki Group divested from Sosian Energy, a Kenyan independent power producer (IPP) which owns a concession contract to build a 35-megawatt geothermal power station in the Menengai Crater. The ownership was sold to Gideon Moi for an undisclosed amount.

== Personal life ==
Narendra Raval is married to Neeta Raval, a medical doctor, with whom he has fathered three children two sons and a daughter.

== Philanthropy ==
Narendra Raval is a passionate philanthropist, and has publicly pledged to leave 50 percent of his wealth to charity and the remaining 50 percent to his children. His autobiography, entitled "Guru: A Long Walk To Success", was released in 2018. Raval is reported to have donated all proceeds from the book to charity.

== See also ==
- Jayesh Saini
- List of cement manufacturers in Kenya
- List of Indians in Africa
