= Aouguenz =

Aouguenz أوكنز
- Rural commune and town
- Location within Morocco
- Coordinates: 29.82796°N 9.15647°W
- Country: Morocco
- Region: Souss-Massa-Drâa
- Province: Chtouka-Aït Baha Province

Population (2004)
  - Total: 5,886
- Time zone: UTC+0 (GMT)

Aouguenz is a small town and rural commune in Chtouka-Aït Baha Province of the Souss-Massa-Drâa region of Morocco. At the time of the 2004 census, the commune had a population of 5,886 living in 1,304 households.
