= Libyan Cement Company =

Libyan Cement Company (LCC)
- Native name: الشركة الليبية للأسمنت
- Type: Joint Venture, FDI
- Industry: Cement
- Founded: 1968
- Headquarters: Benghazi, Libya
- Area served: Libya
- Key people: Ahmed Gadalla (Chairman)
- Products: Cement; Ordinary Portland cement Sulphate-resistant cement Ready-mix concrete Gypsum; Lime
- Number of employees: 1000+
- Website: www.lcc.ly

Libyan Cement Company Inc. (Arabic: الشركة الليبية للأسمنت), known by its acronym LCC, is one of the largest cement manufacturers in Libya and the principal cement producer in the eastern region of the country. Headquartered in Benghazi, the company operates production facilities at Benghazi, Hawari and Al-Fataiah. Its product range includes ordinary Portland cement, sulphate-resistant cement, gypsum and lime.

The Libyan Cement Company was established in 1968. The company's first cement production line was commissioned in Benghazi in April 1972, followed by additional lines commissioned in 1974 and 1977. Over its history, the Libyan Cement Company has undergone several changes of ownership. In 2008, The Libyan Cement Manufacturing Joint Venture Company (JLCC), a joint venture between Austria's Asamer Group and Libya's Economic and Social Development Fund (ESDF), acquired a 90% stake in LCC, while the remaining 10% was held by LCC employees. In April 2015, Libya Holdings Group announced an agreement to acquire a majority stake in LCC from QuadraCir Group, formerly Asamer Holding AG.

In 2023, Ahmed Gadalla, founder and chairman of Alushibe Holding Group, acquired shares in the Libyan Cement Company and later became chairman of the company. Alushibe Holding Group is a Libyan holding group with operations across industrials, consumer goods, retail, healthcare, engineering and services. Following the change in leadership, LCC began a programme of rehabilitation and investment aimed at upgrading its production facilities and expanding operations.

== History ==
=== Founding and early production (1968–1980s) ===
The Libyan Cement Company began production in 1972 with a single factory in Benghazi, with an initial capacity of 200,000 tonnes per year of ordinary Portland cement. A second production line was commissioned in 1974, adding a further 400,000 tonnes per year of capacity, followed by a third line in 1977 with an additional 400,000-tonne capacity, which brought the company's total output to approximately one million tonnes per year.

The company expanded its operations through additional facilities in the surrounding region. The Hawari cement plant was established in 1978 with a design capacity of one million tonnes per year of ordinary Portland cement. In 1987, modifications were made to both production lines to produce sulphate-resistant cement for the Great Man-Made River project. The El-Fataiah cement factory, located approximately 20 km east of Derna and 300 km east of Benghazi, began production in 1984. It has two production lines with a combined capacity of one million tonnes per year. A paper-bag manufacturing facility began production in 1975 with an initial capacity of 100,000 bags per day. A second production line was added in 1978.

=== Operational developments (2000s) ===
By 2007, the Benghazi plant was producing approximately 800,000 tonnes per year. The original 1972 factory subsequently halted production owing to maintenance problems.

=== Changes in ownership (2008–present) ===
In 2008, The Libyan Cement Manufacturing Joint Venture Company (JLCC), a joint venture between Austria's Asamer Group and Libya's Economic and Social Development Fund (ESDF), acquired a 90% stake in LCC, while the remaining 10% was held by LCC employees. In April 2015, Libya Holdings Group announced an agreement to acquire a majority stake in LCC from QuadraCir Group, formerly Asamer Holding AG.

In 2023, Ahmed Gadalla, founder and chairman of Alushibe Holding Group, acquired shares in the Libyan Cement Company and later became chairman of the company.

The company announced plans to rehabilitate and expand its production facilities, with the stated aim of increasing total annual production capacity to approximately three million tonnes.

== Operations ==
The Libyan Cement Company operates production facilities across the eastern region of Libya, with its main operations concentrated in and around Benghazi. In 2012, Global Cement reported that LCC's six production lines across Benghazi, Hawari and Al-Fataiah supplied more than one third of Libya's cement demand.

=== Production facilities ===
The company's principal production sites are located at Benghazi, Hawari and Al-Fataiah. The Benghazi plant, the company's original facility, commenced operations in 1972 and produced approximately 800,000 tonnes per year as of 2007. The Hawari plant, established in 1978, has a capacity of one million tonnes per year and was adapted in 1987 to produce sulphate-resistant cement. The El-Fataiah factory, located approximately 20 km east of Derna and 300 km east of Benghazi, began production in 1984. It has two production lines with a combined capacity of one million tonnes per year.

In addition to its cement plants, the company established a dedicated packaging facility in 1975, with an initial capacity of approximately 100,000 cement bags per day.

=== Products ===
The Libyan Cement Company produces a range of cement and construction materials, including ordinary Portland cement, sulphate-resistant cement. Its products serve the construction and infrastructure sectors across Libya.

== Leadership and corporate governance ==
=== Ahmed Gadalla ===
Ahmed Gadalla also known as Ahmed Alushibe has served as Chairman of the Libyan Cement Company since 2023.

Gadalla is the founder and chairman of Alushibe Holding Group, one of Libya's largest privately owned diversified groups, which he established in 2008. The group operates across six sectors, including industrials, consumer goods, retail, healthcare, engineering and services. He also serves as chairman of Tosyalı SULB, one of the world's largest producers of direct reduced iron (DRI). In 2024, Tosyalı SULB began investment in a DRI complex in Benghazi described as the world's largest, with a planned annual production capacity of approximately 8.1 million tonnes.

Ahmed Gadalla holds a Bachelor of Science in Industrial Engineering from the University of Garyounis, now the University of Benghazi. He subsequently undertook preparatory studies at Indiana University Southeast in the United States, completed an Extended Diploma in International Business - Strategy at SCQF Level 11, awarded by the Scottish Qualifications Authority, and participated in the Certified Manager Programme of the Chartered Management Institute. In 2025, he completed a Master of Business Administration at International Business University in Toronto, Canada.

Under Gadalla's chairmanship, the Libyan Cement Company announced plans to rehabilitate and expand its production facilities, with the stated aim of increasing total annual production capacity to approximately three million tonnes.
