= Tororo District =

- District
- District location in Uganda
- Coordinates: 00°45′N 34°05′E
- Country: Uganda
- Region: Eastern Region
- Capital: Tororo

Area
  - Land: 1,196.4 km^{2} (461.9 sq mi)

Population (2012 Estimate)
  - Total: 487,900
  - Density: 407.8/km^{2} (1,056/sq mi)
- Time zone: UTC+3 (EAT)
- Website: www.tororo.go.ug

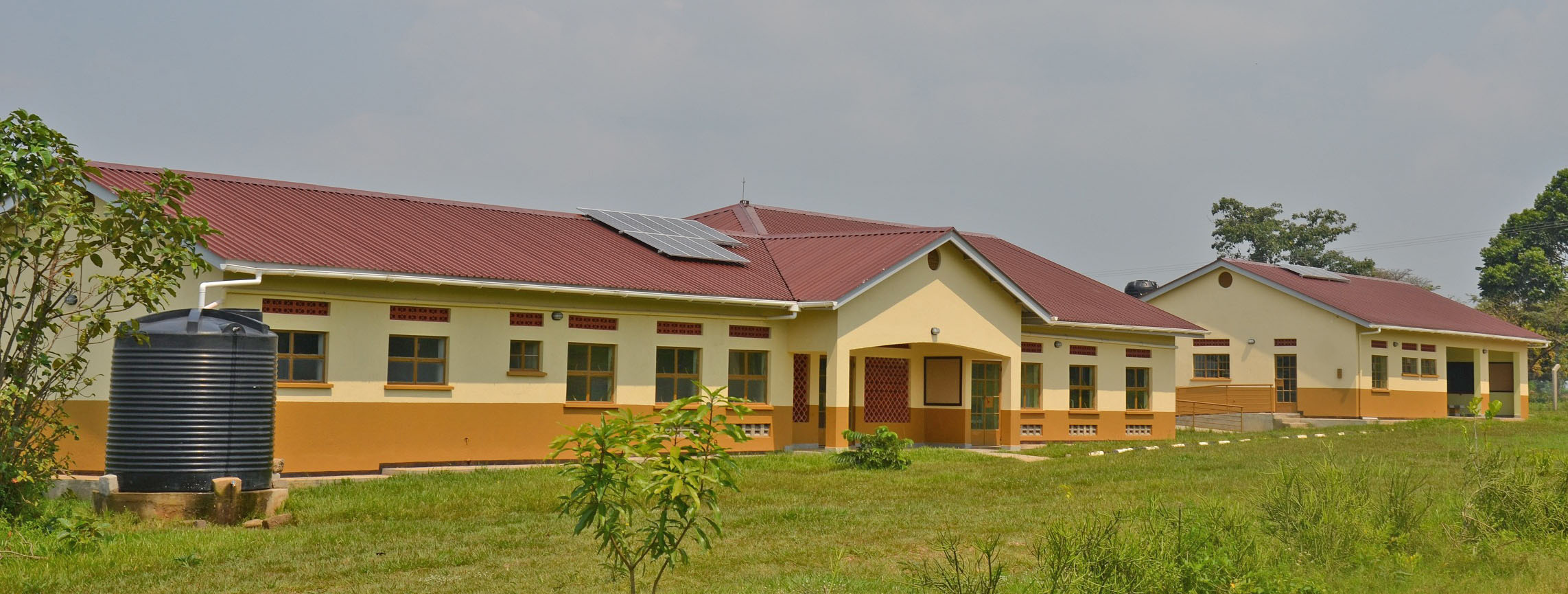
Katajula Health centre III in Tororo district.jpg

Tororo District is a district in the Eastern Region of Uganda. The town of Tororo serves as the district headquarters.

== Location ==
Tororo District is bordered by Mbale District to the north, Manafwa District to the north-east, Kenya to the east, Busia District to the south, Bugiri District to the south-west, and Butaleja District to the north-west. Tororo, the largest town in the district and the location of the district headquarters, is approximately 230 kilometres (140 mi), east of Kampala, the capital and largest city of Uganda.

Tororo is also found in Bukedi Region and it's formed by a number of counties:

1. Tororo Municipality
2. Tororo South County
3. Tororo North County
4. West Budama Central County
5. West Budama County
6. West Budama North East County

=== West Budama North East County ===
This county is made up of five sub-counties: Kirewa, Nawire, Paya, Sere, and Soni.

=== West Budama County ===
West Budama County is the biggest county in Tororo District with over 12 sub-counties: Iyolwa, Iyolwa town council, Katajula, Kisoko, Magola, Nagongera, Nagongera town council, Nyagole, Ojilai, Osia, Petta, and Rubongi.

=== West Budama Central County ===
Mulanda, Mwello, Nabuyoga, Nabuyoga town council, Pajwenda town council, and Siwa are the sub-counties in West Budama Central County.

=== Tororo North County ===
The county includes Akadot, Apetai, Magodes town council, Merikit, Merikit town council, Molo and Mukuju.

=== Tororo South County ===
Below are sub-counties in Tororo South County: Apokor town council, Kalait, Kayoro, Kwapa, Kwapa town council, Malaba town council, Mella, Morukatipe and Osukuru town council.

=== Tororo Municiparity ===
- Tororo Eastern

This county has four parishes namely Amagoro A, Amagoro B, Kasoli and Nyangole.

- Tororo Western

This county has also four parishes: Agururu A, Agururu B, Bison/Magoria and Central.

== Population ==
In 1991, the national population census estimated the population of the district at 285,300. The 2002 national census estimated the population at 379,400, with an annual population growth rate of approximately 2.7 percent. In 2012, the mid-year population was estimated at 487,900. in 2014 the population was 517,080 and 2024 it was 609,939.

== Economic activities ==
Agriculture is the backbone of the district economy. Most of the district produce is consumed locally or sold in the urban areas within the district. Crops grown include the following:

- Millet
- Cassava
- Peas
- Beans
- Sweet potatoes
- Simsim
- Sunflower
- Cotton
- Onions
- Rice
- Maize
- Printing services
- Brick making
- Pottery
- Wholesale and Retail sale
- Grain milling
- Construction
- Boda-boda Business
- Bookshop business
- Roof tile making
- Leisure industry

== Livestock kept by the populatio ==
- Cattle
- Chicken
- Sheep
- Goat
- Pig
- Ducks
- Turkey

== Notable people ==
- Tezira Jamwa

== See also ==
- Adhola Kingdom
- Parliament of Uganda
- Tororo
- Districts of Uganda
- Tororo (food)
- Eastern Region, Uganda
- Tororo Cement Limited
- Tororo General Hospital
- Tororo Solar Power Station
- Tororo Girls School
- Tororo Steel Mill
