= Tororo Cement Limited =

Ugandan company that supplies construction materials

Coordinates: 00°39′36″N 34°09′18″E

- Company type: Private
- Industry: Manufacture of Construction Materials
- Founded: 1952
- Headquarters: Tororo, Uganda
- Key people: B.M. Gagrani; Executive Director
- Products: Cement, Galvanized Iron, Steel Bars, Nails
- Number of employees: 8,000+ (2015)
- Website: Homepage

Tororo Cement Limited (TCL), a Ugandan company, is one of the largest manufacturers of construction materials in East Africa.

== Location ==
The main factories of TCL are in the town of Tororo, approximately 207 kilometres (129 mi), by road, east of Kampala, the capital and largest city of Uganda. This is approximately 13.5 kilometres (8 mi), by road, west of the border town of Malaba and the international border between Uganda and Kenya. The coordinates of the main factory are 0°39'36.0"N, 34°09'18.0"E (Latitude:0.6600; Longitude:34.1550).

== Overview ==
TCL is the largest manufacturer of cement in Uganda, producing an estimated 3.0 million metric tonnes annually. In second place is Hima Cement Limited, which produces an estimated 1.7 million metric tonnes annually. In July 2015, TCL successfully completed and commissioned a UGX:86 billion expansion to increase annual production to 3.0 million metric tonnes. Production on the newly completed production line is expected to begin in March 2018.

== History ==
TCL was established in 1952 by the British colonial government to manufacture cement from the abundantly available limestone in the area around the town of Tororo in the Eastern Region. The company, then known as Uganda Cement Industries (UCI), was administered as a parastatal company under the umbrella of the Uganda Development Corporation. In 1995, the government of Uganda divested from UCI, which was then acquired by the present owners and re-branded as Tororo Cement Limited.

== Ownership ==
The shares of stock of TCL are privately held. The detailed shareholding in the company is not publicly disclosed.

== See also ==
- Busia, Uganda
