= Souss-Massa =

Region of Morocco

Souss-Massa Region: جهة سوس ماسة (Arabic); ⵜⴰⵎⵏⴰⴹⵜ ⵏ ⵙⵓⵙ ⵎⴰⵙⵙⴰ(Tamazight)
- Region
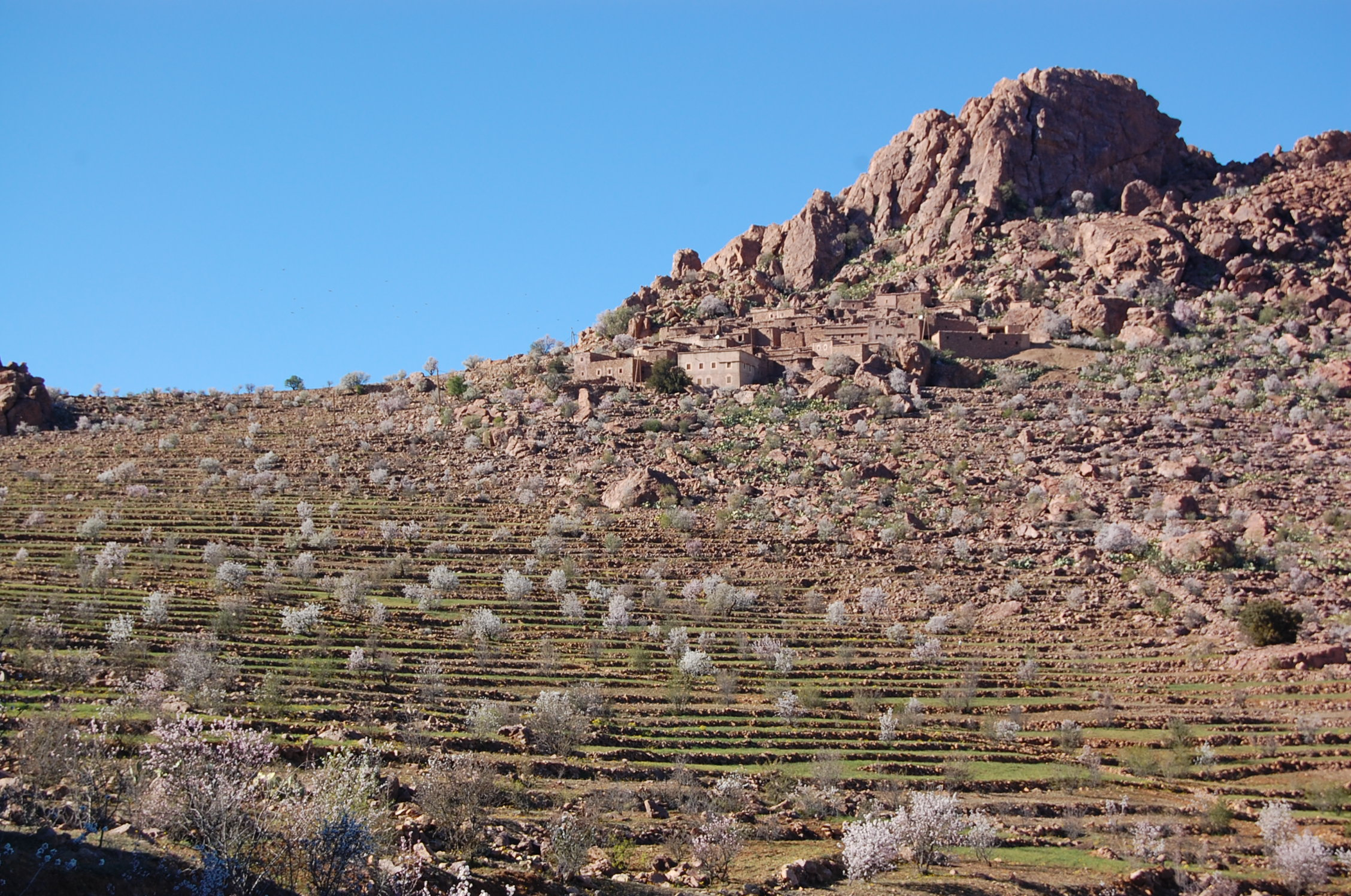

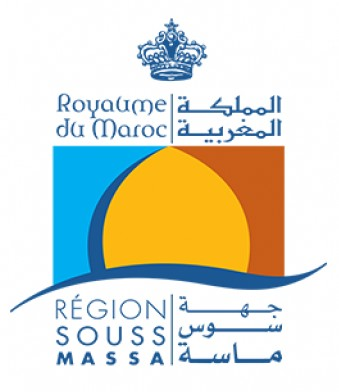
- Seal
- Interactive map of Souss-Massa Region
- Coordinates: 30.08°N 8.48°W
- Country: Morocco
- Created: September 2015
- Capital: Agadir

Government
  - Type: Governor–regional council
  - Wali: Saaïd Amzazi
  - Council president: Karim Achengli (RNI)

Area
  - Total: 51,642 km^{2} (19,939 sq mi)

Population (2024)
  - Total: 3,020,431
  - Rank: 6th out of 12 Regions
  - Density: 58.488/km^{2} (151.48/sq mi)
- Time zone: UTC+0 (GMT)
- ISO 3166 code: MA-09
- Website: www.soussmassa.ma

Souss-Massa (Note: Standard Moroccan Tamazight: ⵙⵓⵙ ⵎⴰⵙⵙⴰ Arabic: سوس ماسة, romanized: sūs māssa) is one of the twelve regions of Morocco. It covers an area of 51,642 km^{2} and had a population of 3,020,431 as of the 2024 Moroccan census. The capital of the region is Agadir.

== Geography ==
Souss-Massa borders the regions of Marrakesh-Safi to the north, Drâa-Tafilalet to the northeast and Guelmim-Oued Noun to the southwest. To the southeast is Algeria's Tindouf Province. The region faces the Atlantic Ocean on its western side: much of the coast is protected by Souss-Massa National Park. The interior of the region is dominated by the Anti-Atlas mountain range, while the Sous River runs across the northern part of the region, in the valley between the Anti-Atlas and the High Atlas. The capital Agadir is located at the mouth of the Sous. Toubkal National Park extends into the northeastern corner of the region.

=== Climate ===
Three factors influence the semi-arid Mediterranean climate of the region: the topography, the oceanic coastline, and the Sahara Desert. In the northern part, dominated by the Atlas Mountains, the climate shifts from humid to semi-arid as one moves towards the plain. This plain, which stretches from the base of the Atlas and includes the basins of the Souss and Massa rivers, experiences an arid climate despite its broad exposure to the Atlantic Ocean. Meanwhile, the southern and southeastern sections of the region, which lie on the northern edge of the Sahara, have a desert climate.

In the Souss plain, average precipitation over the last decade has been 2503 mm, while the high plateaus receive between 350 and 400 mm. The southern part of the region, adjacent to the Sahara, is much drier, but since 2005, the desert has been experiencing a greening trend due to significant winter rains, especially in 2009–2010.

== History ==
Souss-Massa was formed in September 2015 by merging Tata Province, formerly part of Guelmim-Es Semara region, with five provinces of the former Souss-Massa-Drâa region.

== Government ==
Provinces of Souss-Massa

Following the 2021 regional elections, Karim Achengli, also a member of the RNI, was elected president of the regional council. The current wali of the region since 2023 is Said Amzazi.

=== Subdivisions ===
Souss-Massa comprises two prefectures and four provinces:

- Agadir-Ida Ou Tanane Prefecture
- Chtouka-Aït Baha Province
- Inezgane-Aït Melloul Prefecture
- Taroudant Province
- Tata Province
- Tiznit Province

=== Regional leadership ===
Wali of Souss-Massa since 2015
Name	Duration	Under
Zineb El Adaoui	2015–2017	King Mohammed VI
Ahmed Hajji	2017–2023	King Mohammed VI
Saaïd Amzazi	2023–present	King Mohammed VI

Regional Council Presidents of Souss-Massa since 2015
Name	Duration	Party	Under
Ibrahim Hafidi	2015–2021	RNI	King Mohammed VI
Karim Achengli	2021–present	RNI	King Mohammed VI

== Economy ==
The historical Igoudar or communal granaries

Agriculture is a major economic activity in the Sous and Massa river basins located in the northwestern part of the region. Industries related to the processing of agricultural and seafood products are also concentrated in the same area. Agadir is an important fishing and tourist port. Tiznit is known for its traditional silverwork.

== Infrastructure ==
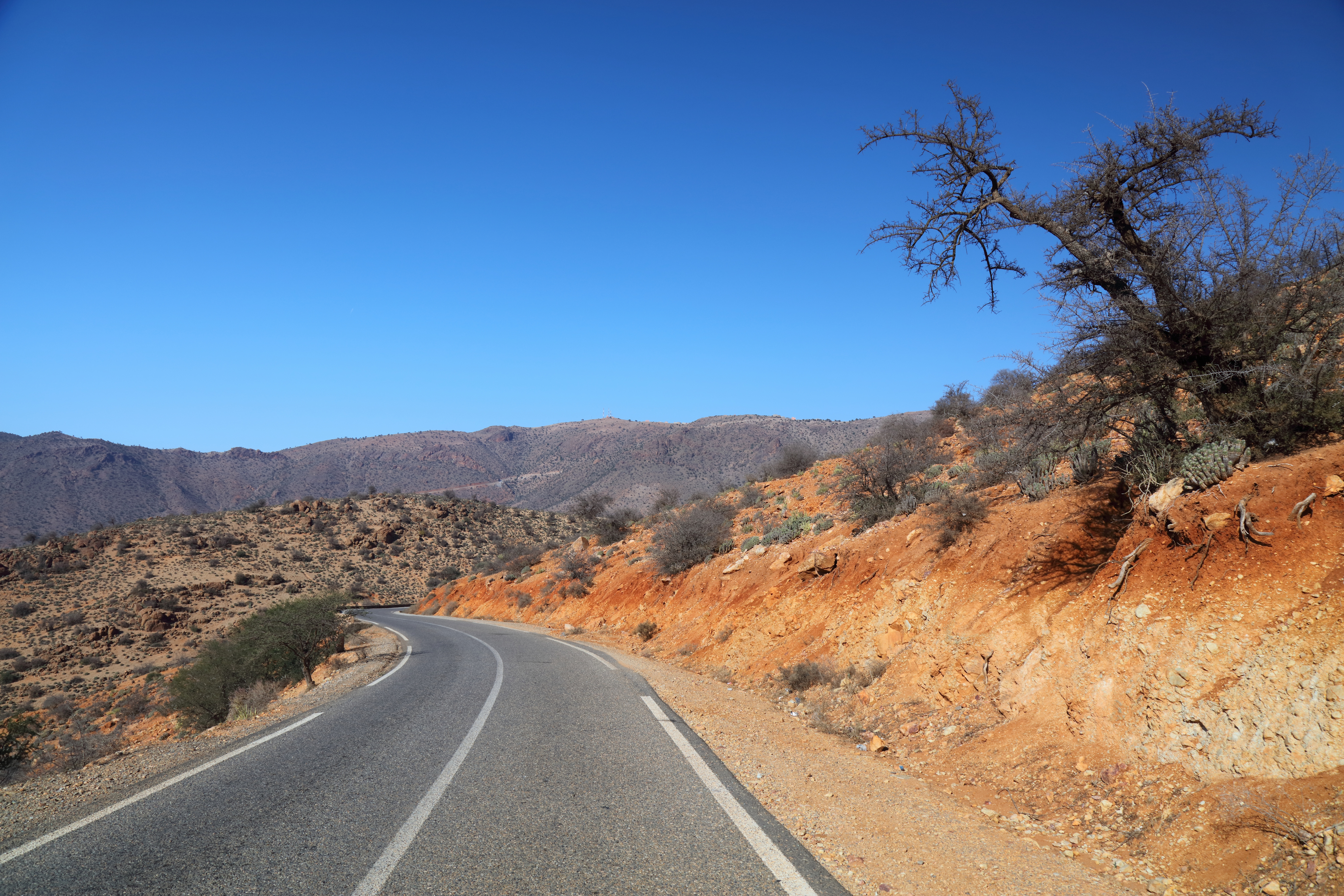
Road R104 in Tiznit Province

The A7 motorway connects Agadir with Marrakesh and Casablanca. The major north–south road through the region is the N1, while the N10 runs east–west in the Sous River valley, connecting Agadir to Taroudant and Ouarzazate. Agadir is a major port city in Morocco and also has an international airport.
