= National identity card (Morocco) =

National identity card of Morocco

Moroccan national identity card البطاقة الوطنية للتعريف Carte nationale d’identité
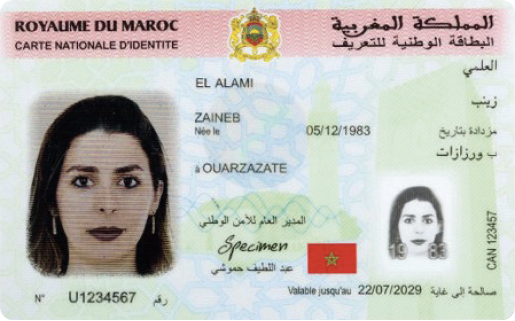

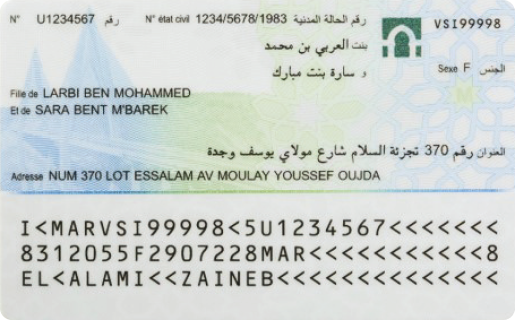
- Type: Electronic identification card
- Issued by: Morocco; Sûreté Nationale
- First issued: 15 February 1977 (law signed); 2020 (new-generation electronic cards)
- Eligibility: Moroccan nationals (mandatory at age 16, optional for minors)
- Expiration: 10 years
- Cost: 75 dirham (US$7.35, for adults and minors over age 12); 50 dirham (US$4.90, for minors under age 12)
- Website: cnie.ma

The Moroccan national identity card (Arabic: البطاقة الوطنية للتعريف, French: carte nationale d’identité; CNI) is the biometric identity document for Moroccan citizens consisting of an electronic ID-1 smart card with identifying information. An immatriculation card (Arabic: بطاقة التسجيل, French: carte d'immatriculation), a variant of the CNI, is issued for foreigners in Morocco for visitors, students, workers, family reunification, and long-term healthcare. It is issued by the General Directorate of National Security (DGSN) and is compulsory after the age of 16 while being valid for a period of 10 years, but can be obtained at any age.

The CNI enjoys a unique position in Moroccan society, and is used in nearly every aspect of transactional life in the country. The CNI has various usages and essentially replaces various documents; birth certificate, certificate of residence, proof of life, and certification of nationality. The DGSN procedurally coordinates with other government departments for proof of identity and confirmation of fingerprints among other uses, such as law enforcement and passports.

The new-generation electronic identification (CNIe) is a contactless (NFC) card compliant with the ICAO DOC9303 standard and is used alongside the Mon Identité Numérique digital identity application developed by the Agency for Digital Development (ADD) for electronic identification and trust services, and was first introduced in 2020. About 20 million active CNI cards have been issued covering 85% of the Moroccan population, about 5,2 million of which are under the new-generation CNIe system.

== Requirements ==
The following requirements are needed for issuing a national identity card:

- CNIe pre-application form (if filled out);
- Four recent passport-size photographs, no more than 6 months old, conforming to biometric standards;
- A fee (stamp duty) of 75 dirham for applicants over age 12 and 50 dirham for applicants under age 12;
- Copy of the page of the family booklet regarding the applicant or;
  - A full copy of the civil registry regarding the applicant or;
  - A birth certificate for the applicant (the last two documents must be valid for no more than three months, and must be written in Arabic and Latin);
- Court order, royal decree, certificate of nationality, or certified copy of the act granting Moroccan nationality (for foreigners or when the applicant's Moroccan nationality appears doubtful);
- Certificate of residence issued by:
  - Police services in urban areas or;
  - The Royal Gendarmerie for rural areas;
  - A certificate of consular registration for Moroccans living abroad;
- To obtain the optional entry "wife" or "widow(er)" on the CNI card:
  - a certified copy of the marriage certificate;
  - birth certificate of spouse;
  - spouse's death certificate;
- For minor applicants, the minor's presence is mandatory alongside their legal guardian, who must present a copy of their CNI and proof of their status;

== History ==
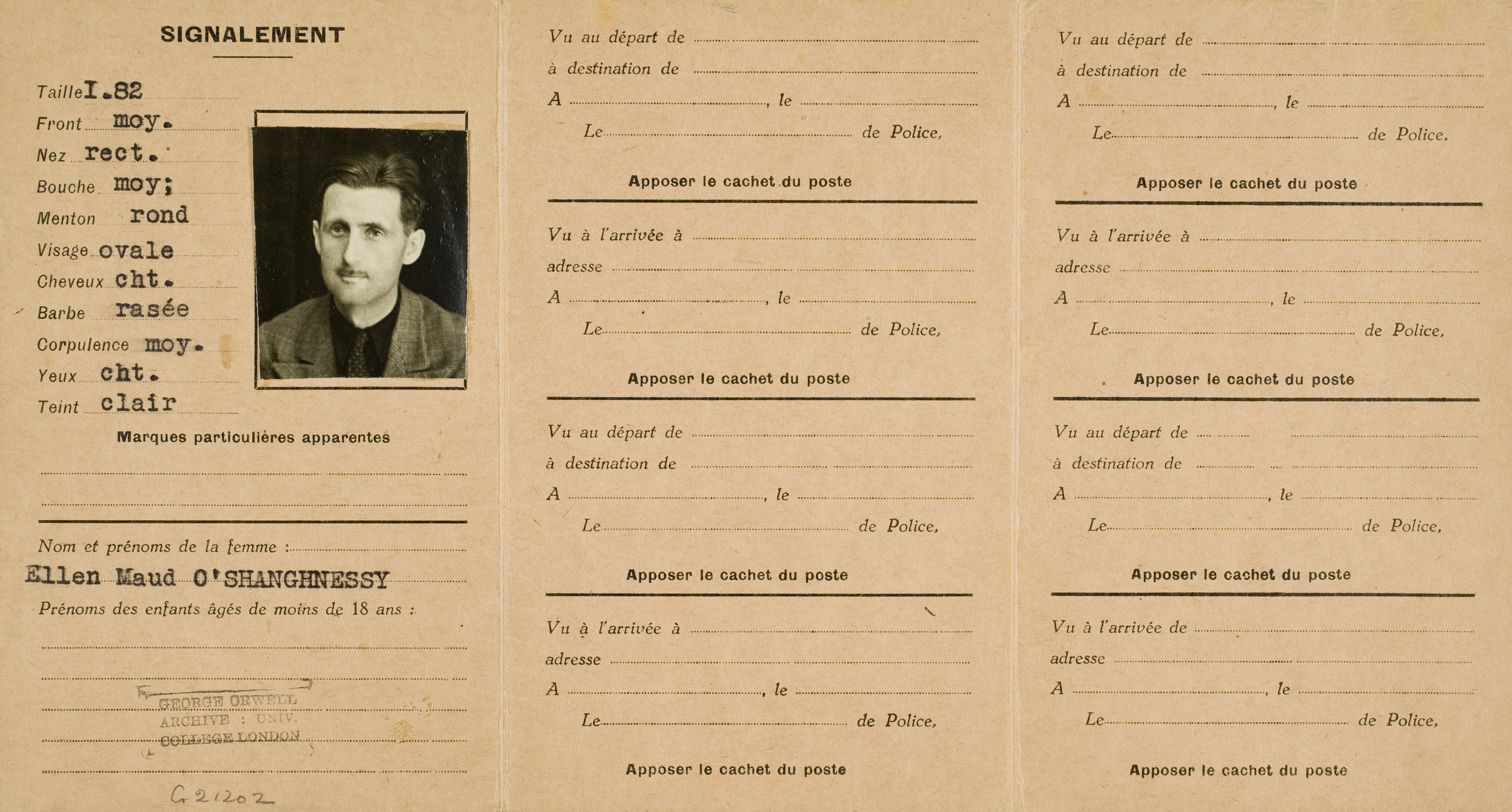

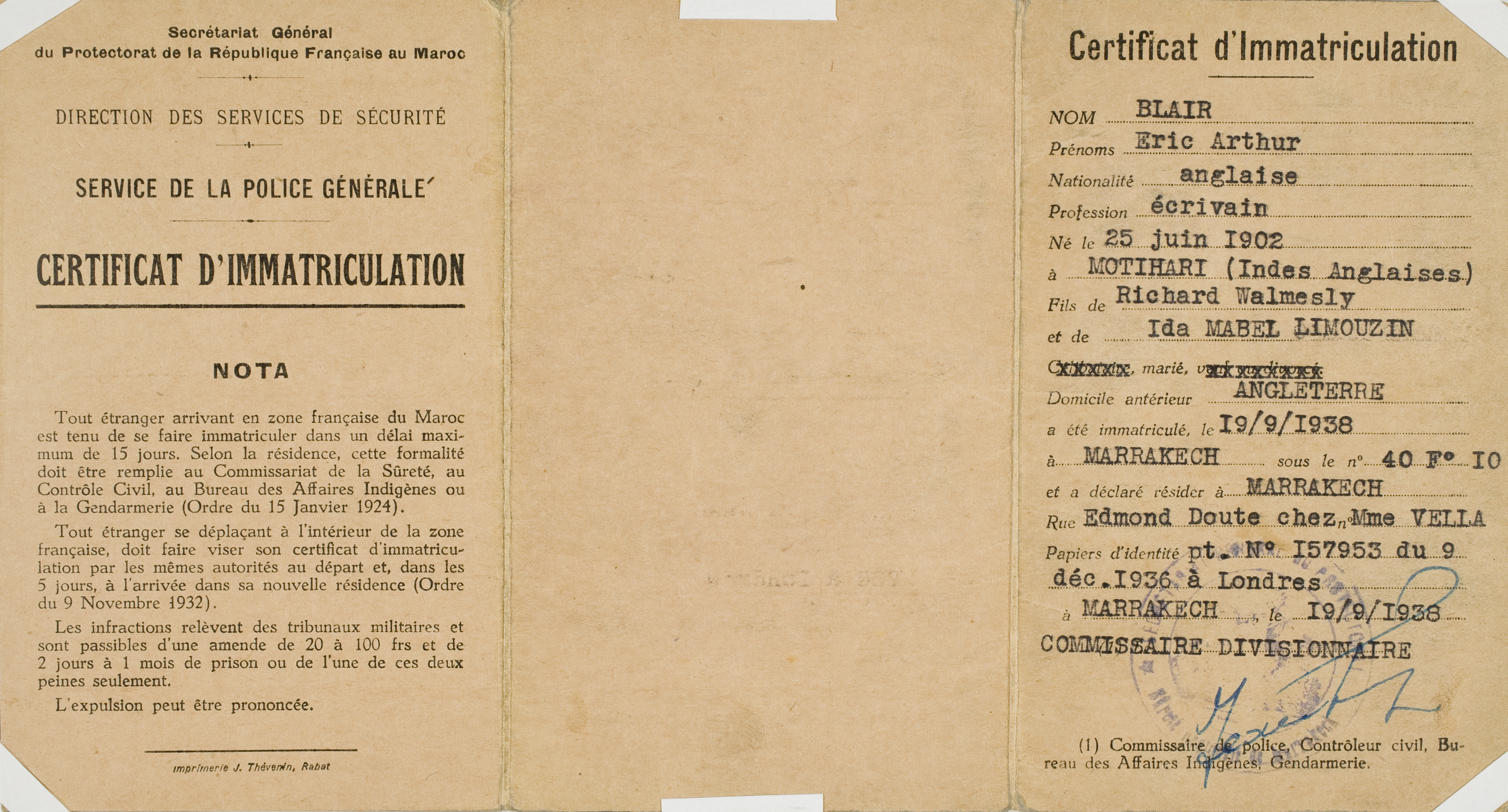
Moroccan immatriculation card issued to George Orwell in 1938, during the French protectorate

A national identity program existed in Morocco since the late 1970s, the Moroccan national identity card was instituted as n° 1-73-560 and signed by King Hassan II on 15 February 1977 following a meeting with the Council of Ministers on 13 March 1975. A semi-electronic identity system was introduced in 1996 with a paper fingerprint system.

In 2008, a fully-electronic identification system (CNIe) was introduced with an automated fingerprint system in a partnership between the DGSN and the French Thales Group. The CNIe was a smart card with a barcode and RFID support. In 2020, a new CNIe system was implemented in a partnership between the DGSN, the ADD and IDEMIA.

== Technology ==
The National Identity Registry is a foundational national identity system implemented alongside the card and is one of the only registries in the country which implements biometrics, making it one of the most robust in the country. It should not be confused with the World Bank financed Registre National des Populations intended for social benefits management and which covered 10 million users in 2023.

The system delivered by IDEMIA implements the OSIA standard for interoperability and iDAKTO's IDCluster platform for digital ID.

The registry registers fingerprints using a non-standard method, with 4 fingers captured flat on live scan for verifying duplicates and for quick checks, while 10 fingers captured rolled with ink then scanned for offline validation, all fingerprints are then registered on an automated fingerprint identification system (AFIS). It is unclear why the unorthodox method was chosen, but the World Bank suggests that a 10 fingers rolled printed format were requested by judicial authorities.

Structure of the National Identity Number Source:
positions	length	chars	meaning
1-3	1-3	alpha	Region code where the card was first issued
4-10	6	num	Sequential serial number
11-12	2	num	Luhn control number

Region code in the National Identity Number Source:
code	region
A, AA, AC, AJ	Rabat
AB, AE, AY, AS	Salé
AD	Témara
B, BA, BB, BE, BH, BJ, BK, BL, BM, BF, BV, BW	Casablanca
BX, DF, PK, PP, PS, PK, PH, PZ	Moroccans residing abroad (MRE)
C, CC, CD	Fez
CB	Sefrou
CN	Boulemane
D, DN	Meknes
DA	Azrou
DB	Ifrane
DC	Moulay Idriss Zerhoun
DJ	Ain Taoujdate
DN	El Hajeb
DO	Ouislane
E, EE	Marrakesh
EA	Ben Guerir
F	Oujda
FA	Berkane
FB	Taourirt
FC	El Aioun Sidi Mellouk
FD	Ain Bni Mathar
FE	Saïdia
FG	Figuig
FH	Jerada
FJ	Ahfir
FK	Touissit
FL	Bouarfa
G	Kenitra, Sidi Yahya El Gharb
GA	Sidi Slimane, Sidi Yahya El Gharb
GB	Souk El Arbaa
GK	Sidi Kacem
GM	Ouazzane
GN	Mechra Bel Ksiri
GJ	Jorf El Melha
H, HH	Safi
HA	Youssoufia
I	Beni Mellal
IA	Kasba Tadla
IB	Fquih Ben Saleh
IC	Azilal
ID	Souk Sebt Ould Nemma
IE	Demnate
J, JK	Agadir
JA	Guelmim
JB	Inezgane, Dcheira El Jihadia
JC	Taroudant
JD	Sidi Ifni
JE	Tiznit
JF	Tan-Tan
JH	Chtouka Aït Baha
JM	Aït Melloul, Temsia, Lqliâa, Oulad Dahou
JT	Oulad Teima
JY	Tata
JZ	Assa-Zag
K, KB	Tangier
KA	Asilah
L	Tétouan
LA	Larache
LB	Ksar el-Kebir
LC	Chefchaouen
LE	Martil
LF	Fnideq
LG	M'diq
M	El Jadida
MA	Azemmour
MC	Sidi Bennour
MD	Zemamra
N	Essaouira
O, OD	Dakhla
P	Ouarzazate
PA	Tinghir
PB	Zagora
Q	Khouribga
QA	Oued Zem
R	Al Hoceima
RB	Imzouren
RC	Targuist
RX	Bni Bouayach
S, SA	Nador
SH	Laayoune
SJ	Smara
SK	Tarfaya
SL	Boujdour
T	Mohammedia
TA, TK	Benslimane
U	Errachida
UA	Goulmima
UB	Er-Rich
UC	Erfoud
UD	Rissani
V	Khenifra
VA	Midelt, Itzer
VM	M'rirt
W	Settat
WA	Berrechid
WB	Ben Ahmed
X	Khemisset
XA	Tifelt
Y	Kalaat Sraghna
Z	Taza
ZG	Guercif
ZH	Karia Ba Mohamed
ZT	Taounate
