= List of cities in Morocco =

The basic unit of local government in Morocco is the commune. At the time of the 2014 population census, Morocco was divided into 1538 communes, 256 of which were classified as urban and also called municipalities. The remaining 1282 communes were classified as rural. Urban centres were defined by the High Commission for Planning for some rural communes.

The following list includes all Moroccan municipalities with 50,000 or more inhabitants according to the 2024 census, (Note: Except Ouislane, which is legally defined as part of the city of Meknes: see note g.) as well as one urban centre of a rural commune whose population also exceeds 50,000 inhabitants. In its 2014 census report, the High Commission for Planning also published a list of the legal populations of seven major Moroccan cities, some of which comprise more than one administrative unit. Those legal population figures are incorporated into the list, and the city definitions they are based upon are provided in the notes.

== List of cities with 50,000 or more inhabitants ==
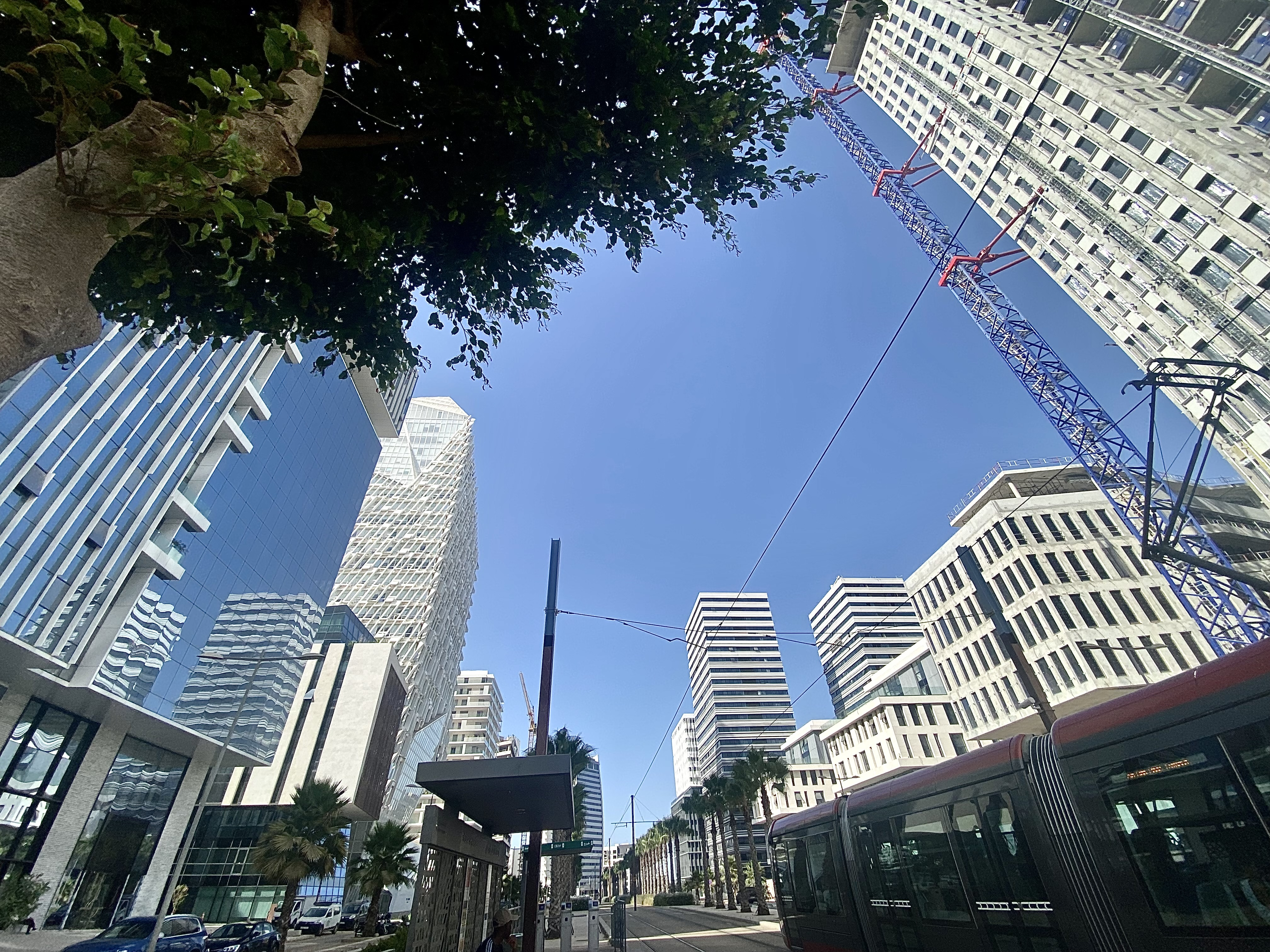
Casablanca, the economic and financial capital

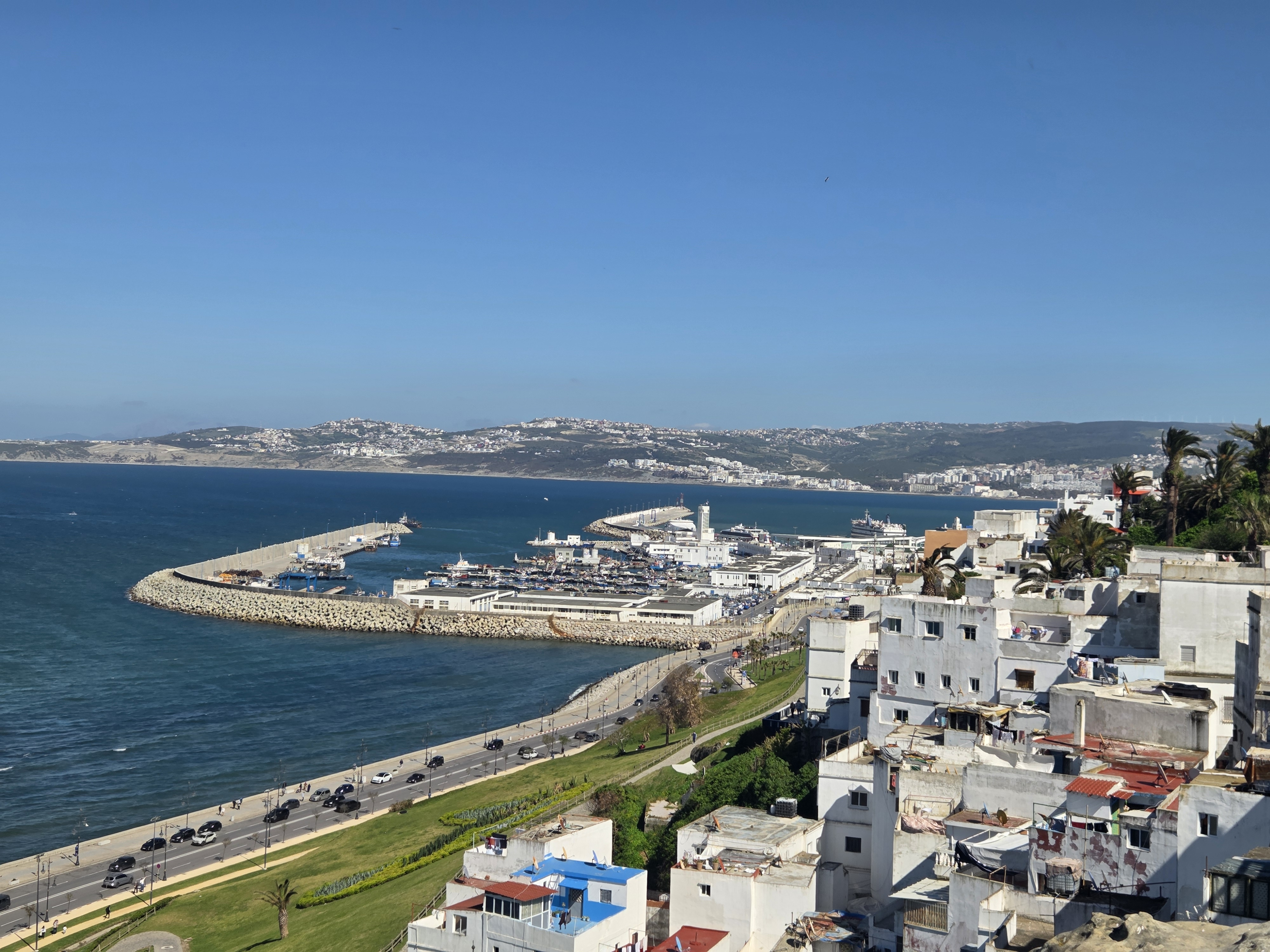
The bay of Tangier, considered the logistical capital

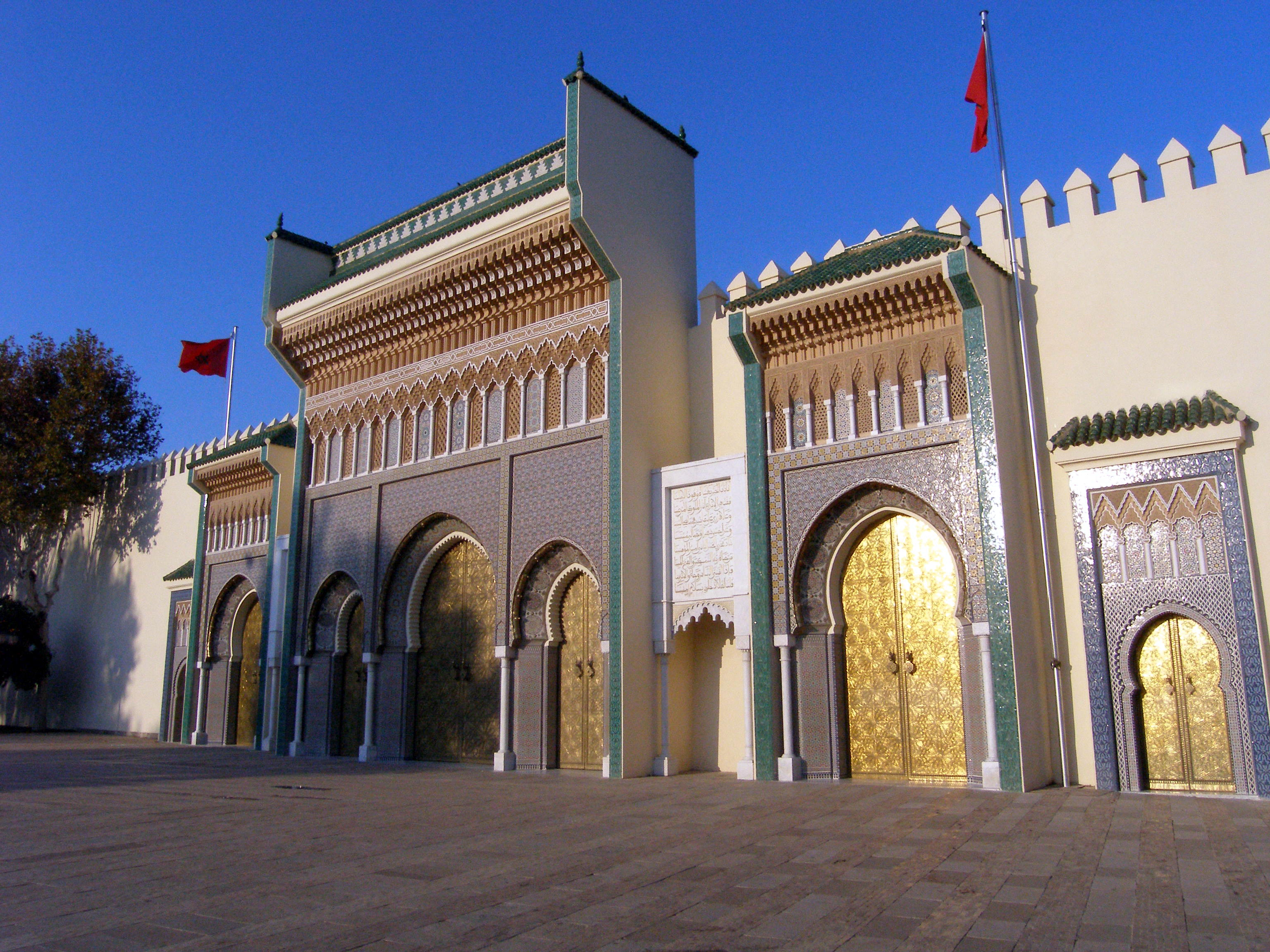
Royal Palace in Fes, the cultural and spiritual capital

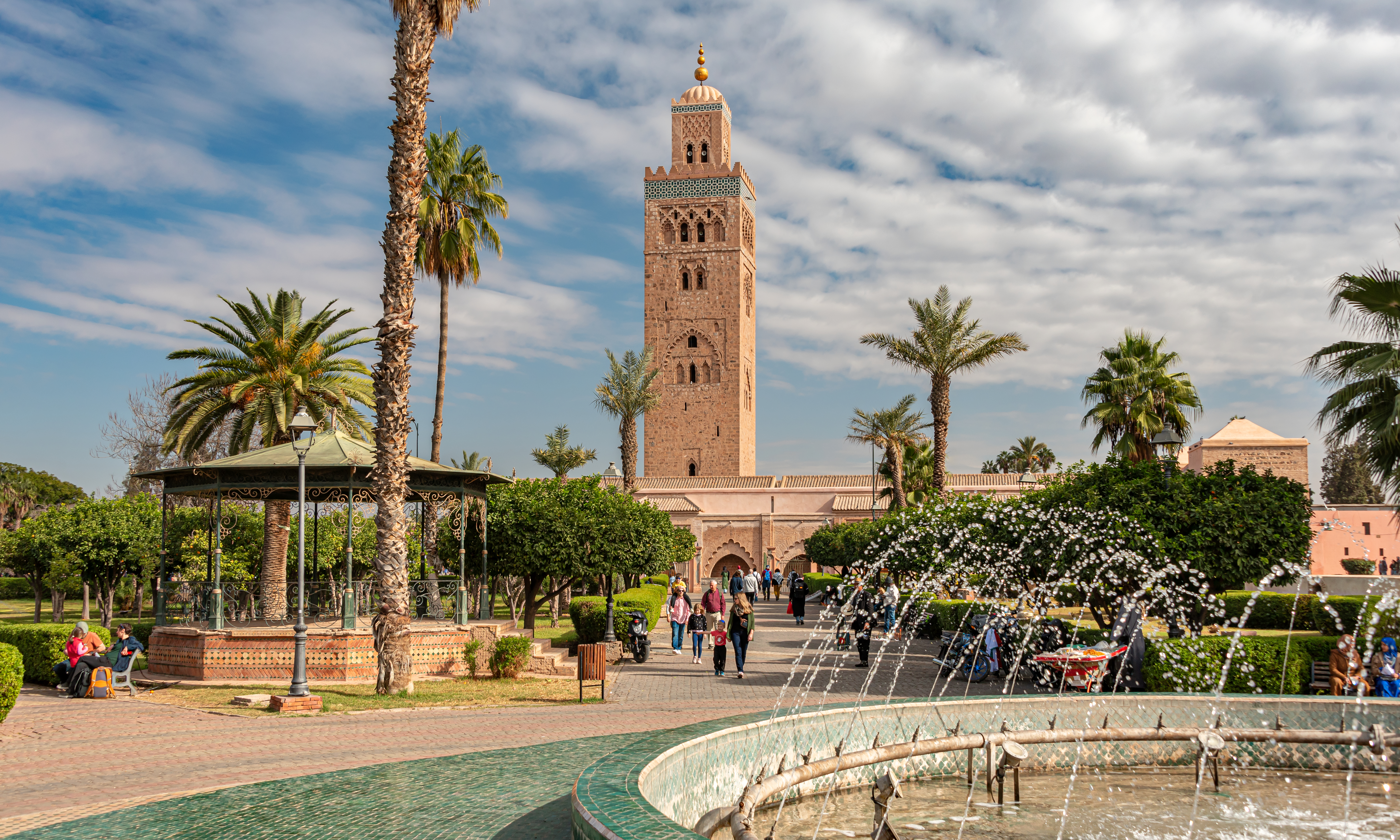
The 12th-century Koutoubia Mosque in Marrakesh, the tourism and hospitality capital

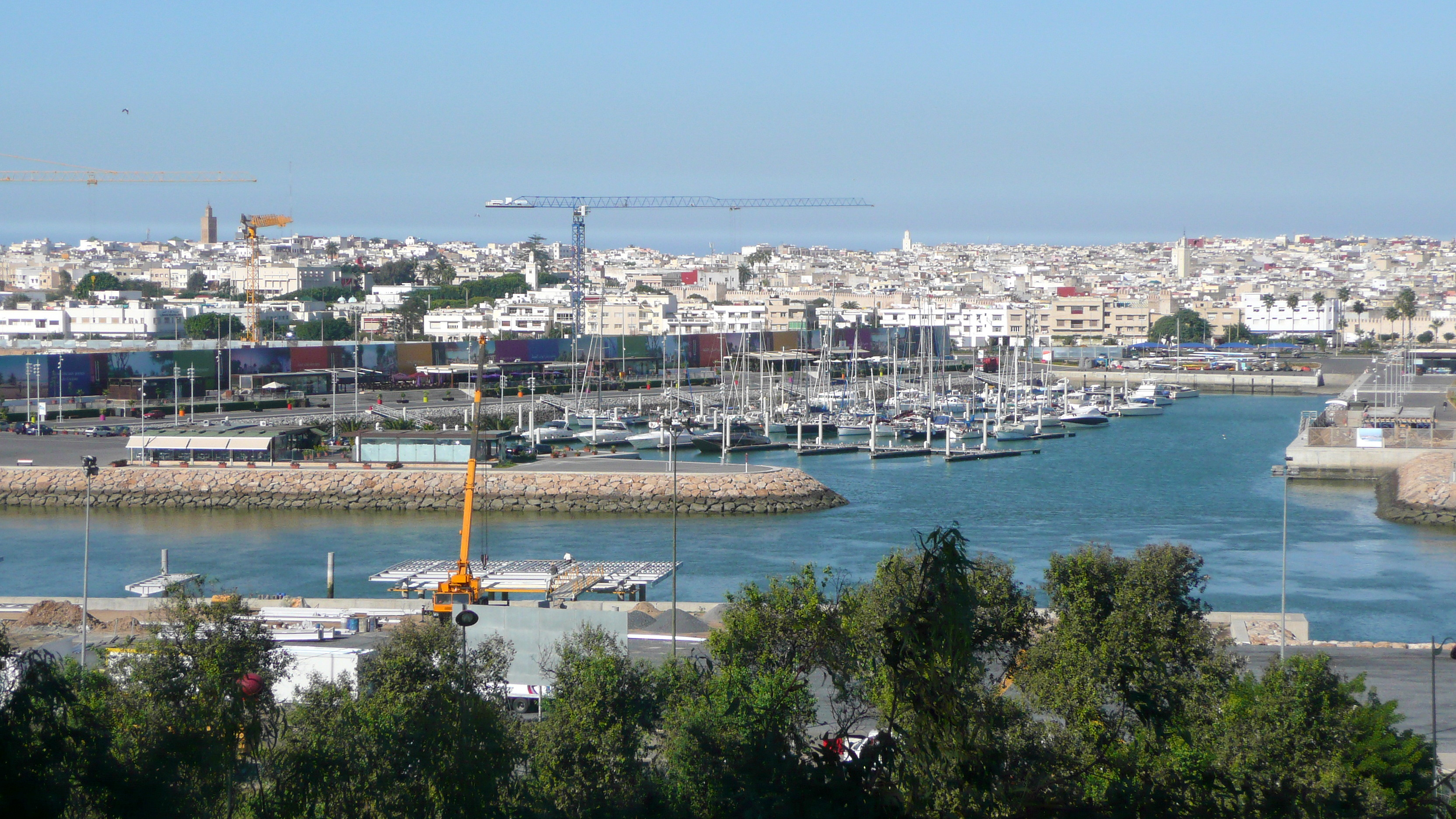
Salé, twin city of Rabat

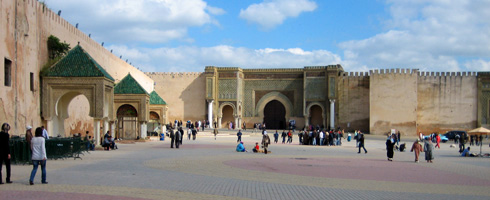
Bab Mansour and El Hedime Place in Meknes

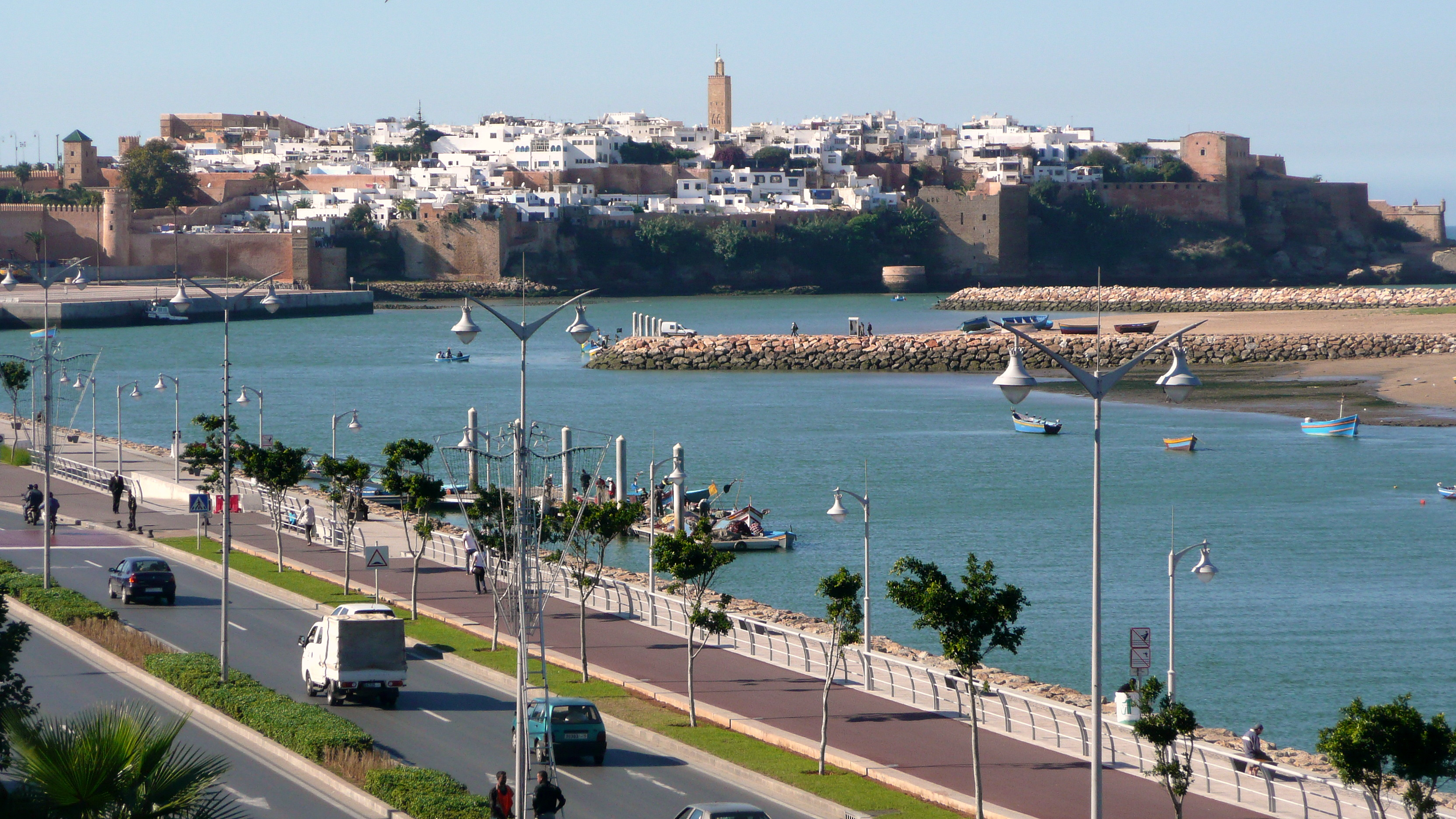
Rabat, the administrative and political capital

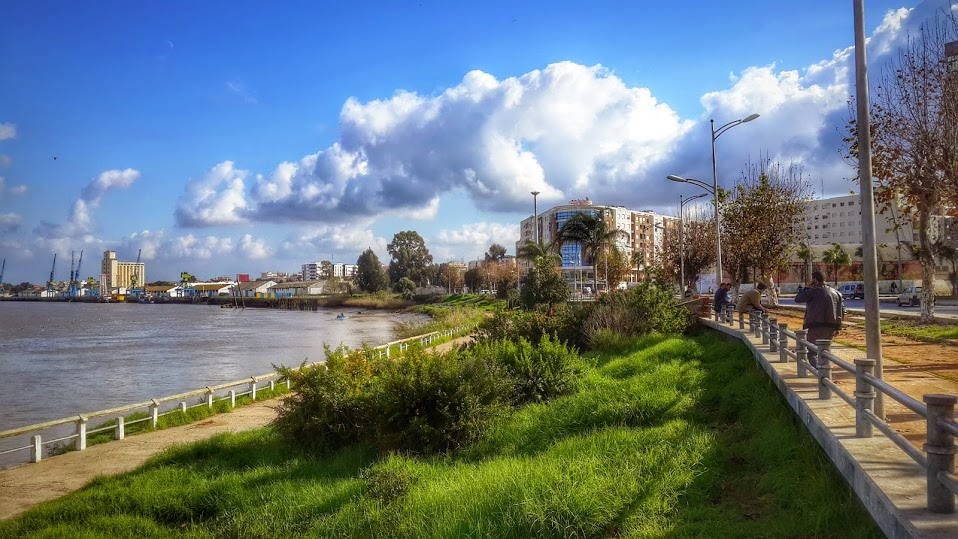
Kenitra, major industrial agglomeration

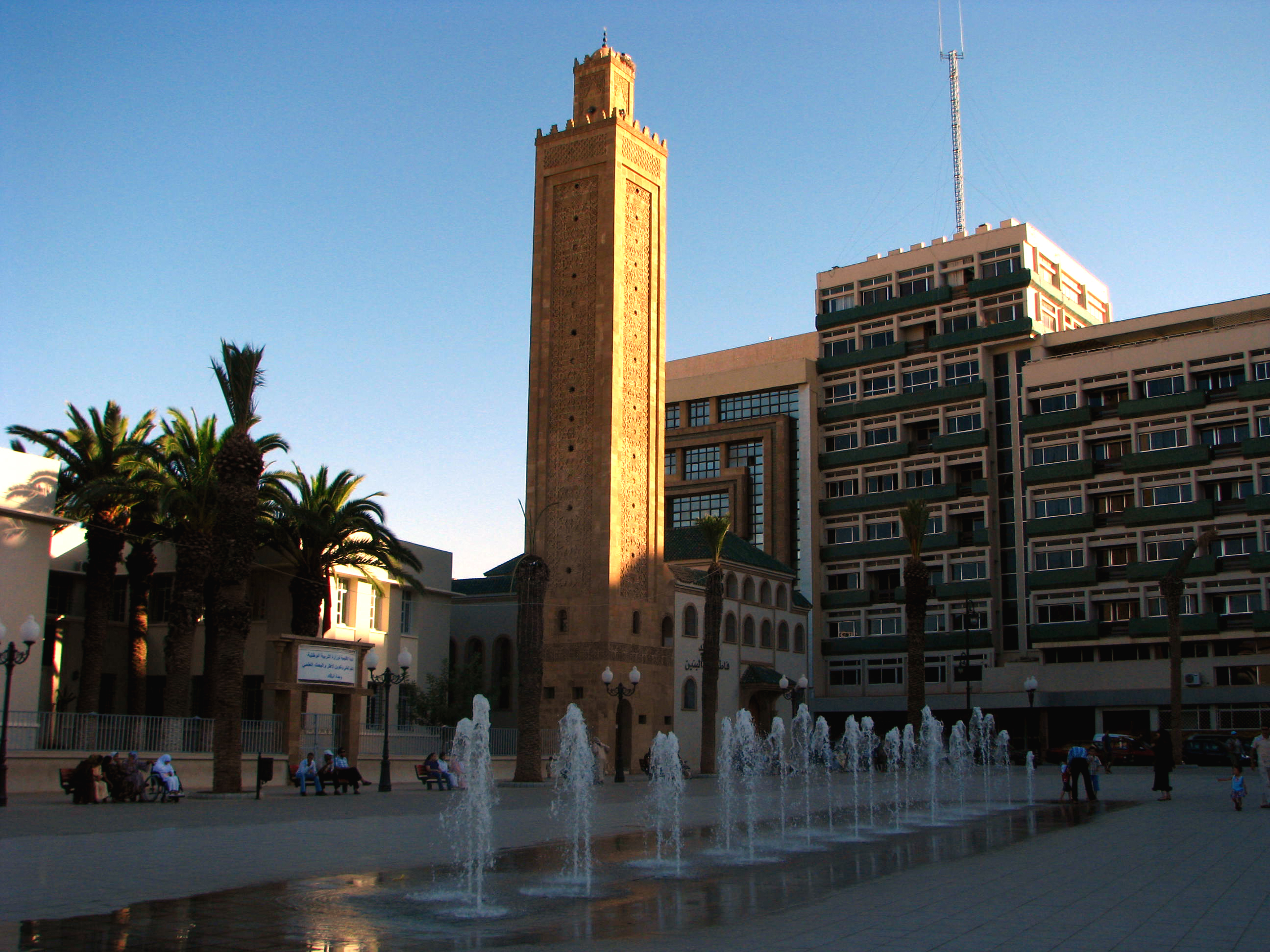
Oujda

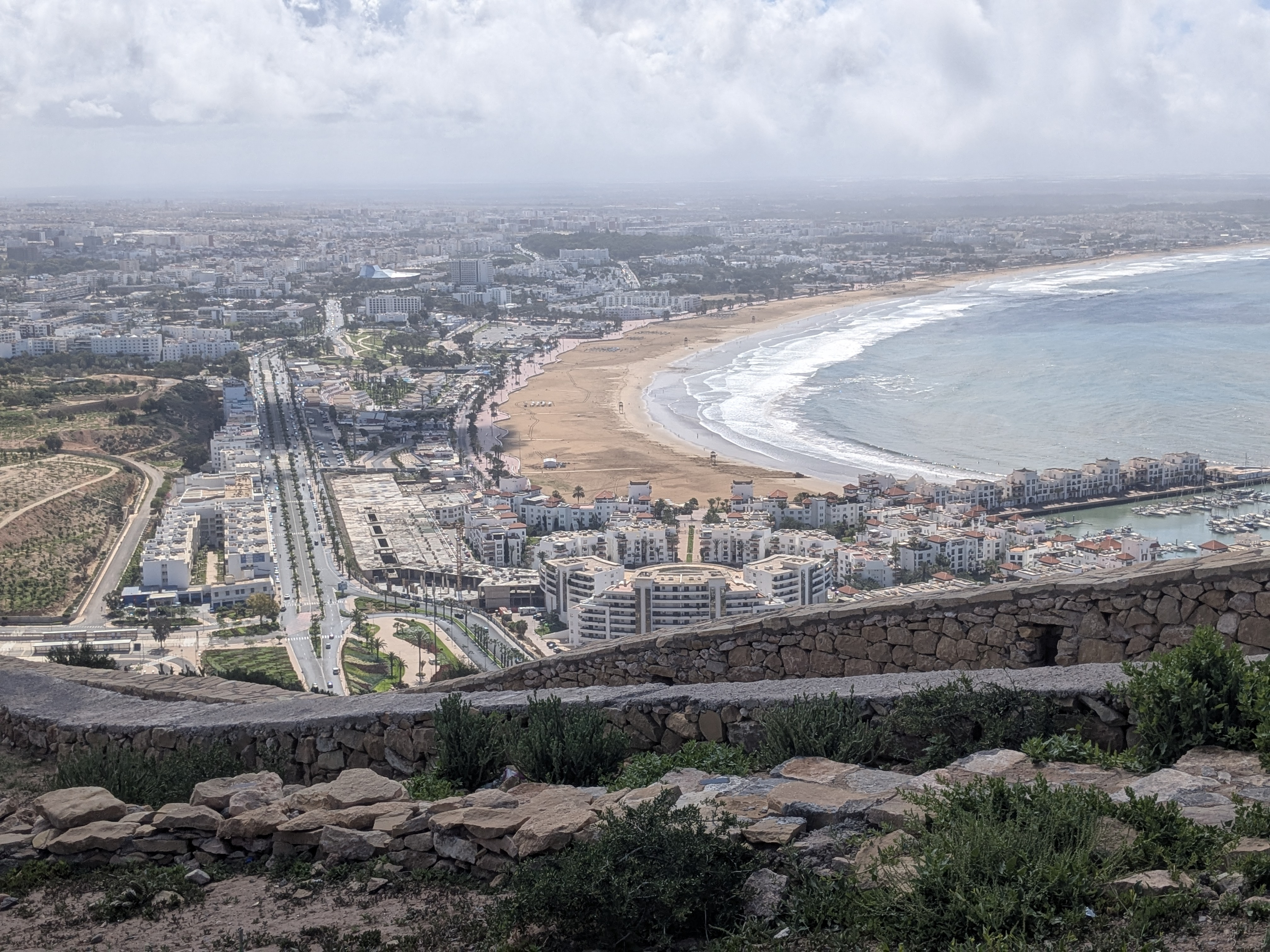
Agadir's bay

Tetouan

Cities in Morocco with a population of 50,000 or more
City	Population (2024)	Region
Casablanca (Note: In the 2024 census, the High Commission for Planning gave the legal population of Casablanca as 3,218,036, which corresponds to the population of Casablanca Prefecture.)	3,218,036	Casablanca-Settat
Tangier (Note: In the 2024 census, the High Commission for Planning gave the legal population of Tangier as 1,275,428 which corresponds to the population of the Commune of tangier.)	1,275,428	Tanger-Tetouan-Al Hoceima
Fez (Note: In the 2024 census, the High Commission for Planning gave the legal population of Fez as 1,239,315 which corresponds to the combined population of those parts of Fez Prefecture not within the cercle of Fez Banlieue ("suburbs").)	1,239,315	Fès-Meknès
Marrakesh (Note: In the 2024 census, the High Commission for Planning gave the legal population of Marrakesh as 1,014,813 which corresponds to the combined population of the municipality of Méchouar-Kasba and the five arrondissements of Annakhil, Gueliz, Marrakech-Médina, Ménara and Sidi Youssef Ben Ali.)	1,014,813	Marrakesh-Safi
Salé (Note: In the 2024 census, the High Commission for Planning gave the legal population of Salé as 945,101 which corresponds to the population of the Commune of Salé.)	945,101	Rabat-Salé-Kénitra
Meknes (Note: In the 2024 census, the High Commission for Planning gave the legal population of Meknes as 695,662 which corresponds to the combined population of the municipalities of Meknes, Al Machouar – Stinia, Toulal and Ouislane.)	695,662	Fès-Meknès
Rabat (Note: In the 2024 census, the High Commission for Planning gave the legal population of Rabat as 515,619 which corresponds to the population of Rabat Prefecture.)	515,619	Rabat-Salé-Kénitra
Kenitra (Note: Doesn't Include Mehdya or Kénitra-Banlieue, which counts an additional 58,558 and 84,435 respectively.)	507,736	Rabat-Salé-Kénitra
Oujda	506,224	Oriental
Agadir (Note: Only includes the Commune of Agadir within Agadir-Ida Ou Tanane Prefecture , Inezgane-Aït Melloul Prefecture counts an additional 636,916.)	504,768	Souss-Massa
Tetouan	422,757	Tanger-Tetouan-Al Hoceima
Safi	323,888	Marrakesh-Safi
Dar Bouazza	302,970	Casablanca-Settat
Temara	297,098	Rabat-Salé-Kénitra
El Jadida	237,464	Casablanca-Settat
Aït Melloul	210,870	Souss-Massa
Beni Mellal	209,594	Béni Mellal-Khénifra
Bouskoura	200,359	Casablanca-Settat
Khouribga	195,931	Béni Mellal-Khénifra
Mohammedia	194,358	Casablanca-Settat
Settat	171,556	Casablanca-Settat
Berrechid	168,687	Casablanca-Settat
Nador	158,202	Oriental
Taza	150,763	Fès-Meknès
Inezgane	137,512	Souss-Massa
Larache	133,731	Tanger-Tetouan-Al Hoceima
Guelmim	126,729	Guelmim-Oued Noun
Khemisset	125,834	Rabat-Salé-Kénitra
Ksar El Kebir	124,701	Tanger-Tetouan-Al Hoceima
Khenifra	123,738	Béni Mellal-Khénifra
Skhirat	122,705	Rabat-Salé-Kénitra
Benguerir	114,872	Marrakesh-Safi
Dcheira El Jihadia	113,041	Souss-Massa
Lqliaa	107,133	Souss-Massa
El Kelaa Des Sraghna	106,418	Marrakesh-Safi
Tiflet	103,850	Rabat-Salé-Kénitra
Taourirt	100,402	Oriental
Oulad Teima (Houara)	100,284	Souss-Massa
Berkane	99,069	Oriental
Errachidia	97,687	Drâa-Tafilalet
Fquih Ben Salah	97,380	Béni Mellal-Khénifra
Martil	95,896	Tanger-Tetouan-Al Hoceima
Sidi Slimane	95,114	Rabat-Salé-Kénitra
Oued Zem	93,776	Béni Mellal-Khénifra
Bni Yakhlef	89,531	Casablanca-Settat
Lahraouyine	87,977	Casablanca-Settat
Sefrou	86,903	Fès-Meknès
Tiznit	86,595	Souss-Massa
Taroudant	83,496	Souss-Massa
Essaouira	82,962	Marrakesh-Safi
Guercif	80,703	Oriental
Ouarzazate	79,218	Drâa-Tafilalet
Drargua (Note: The population figure refers only to the urban centre (HCP geographic code 09.001.05.09.3) of the rural commune of Drargua.)	78,830	Souss-Massa
Fnideq	77,250	Tanger-Tetouan-Al Hoceima
Tan-Tan	76,134	Guelmim-Oued Noun
Sidi Kacem	75,037	Rabat-Salé-Kénitra
Souk El Arbaa	70,894	Rabat-Salé-Kénitra
Tamensourte	68,285	Marrakesh-Safi
M'diq	67,599	Tanger-Tetouan-Al Hoceima
Sidi Taibi	67,255	Rabat-Salé-Kénitra (Note: The population figure refers only to the urban centre.)
Benslimane	67,317	Casablanca-Settat
Youssoufia	65,669	Marrakesh-Safi
Midelt	62,648	Drâa-Tafilalet
Ain Harrouda	60,804	Casablanca-Settat
Souk Sebt Ouled Nemma	60,293	Béni Mellal-Khénifra
Mehdya	58,558	Rabat-Salé-Kénitra
Ouazzane	57,737	Tanger-Tetouan-Al Hoceima
Azrou	57,657	Fès-Meknès
Ait Ourir	56,954	Marrakech-Safi
Sidi Bennour	56,201	Casablanca-Settat
Tit Mellil	56,019	Casablanca-Settat
Bouznika	55,722	Casablanca-Settat
Biougra	50,626	Souss-Massa
Ech-challalate	52,622	Casablanca-Settat
Beni Ansar	50,508	Oriental
Al Hoceima	50,146	Tanger-Tetouan-Al Hoceima

== See also ==
- List of cities in Western Sahara
- List of metropolitan areas in Africa
- List of largest cities in the Arab world
