= Temsia =

Temsia ⵜⵎⵙⵙⵢⴰ التمسية
- commune
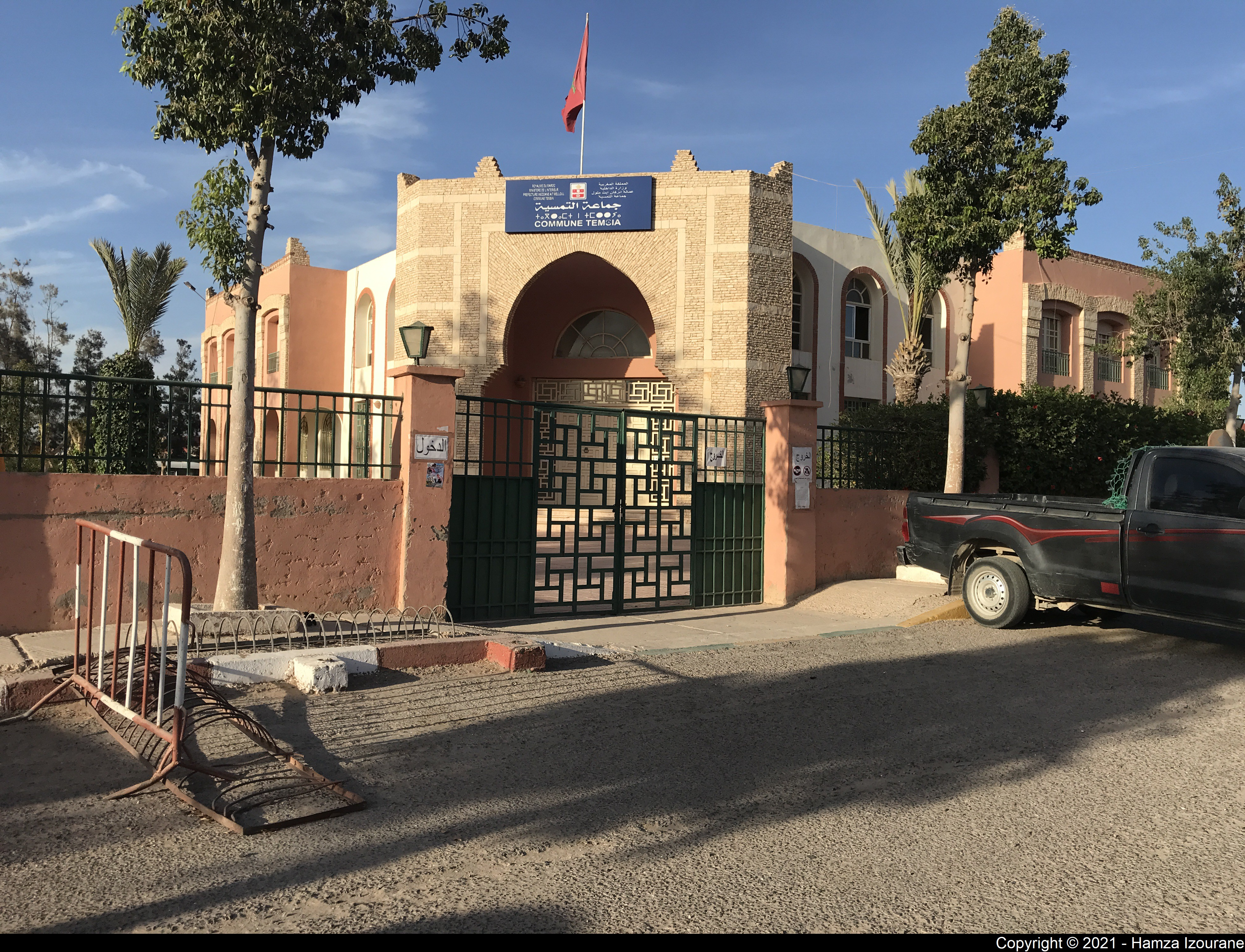
- Interactive map of Temsia
- Coordinates: 30.36°N 9.414°W
- Country: Morocco
- Region: Souss-Massa
- Prefecture: Inezgane-Aït Melloul

Population (2024)
  - commune: 52,663
  - Urban: 37,128
- Time zone: UTC+0 (GMT)
- Postal code: 86602

Temsia is a commune of Morocco. It is located on the south bank of the Sous River in Inezgane-Aït Melloul Prefecture, Souss-Massa region, 20 km southeast of Agadir, the regional capital. It borders Aït Melloul to the west, Lqliâa to the southwest, and the commune of Oulad Dahou to the east.

National Route 10 runs through the main town of Temsia in the northern part of the commune, while Agadir–Al Massira Airport, the international airport that serves Agadir and the surrounding cities, is located in the southern part.

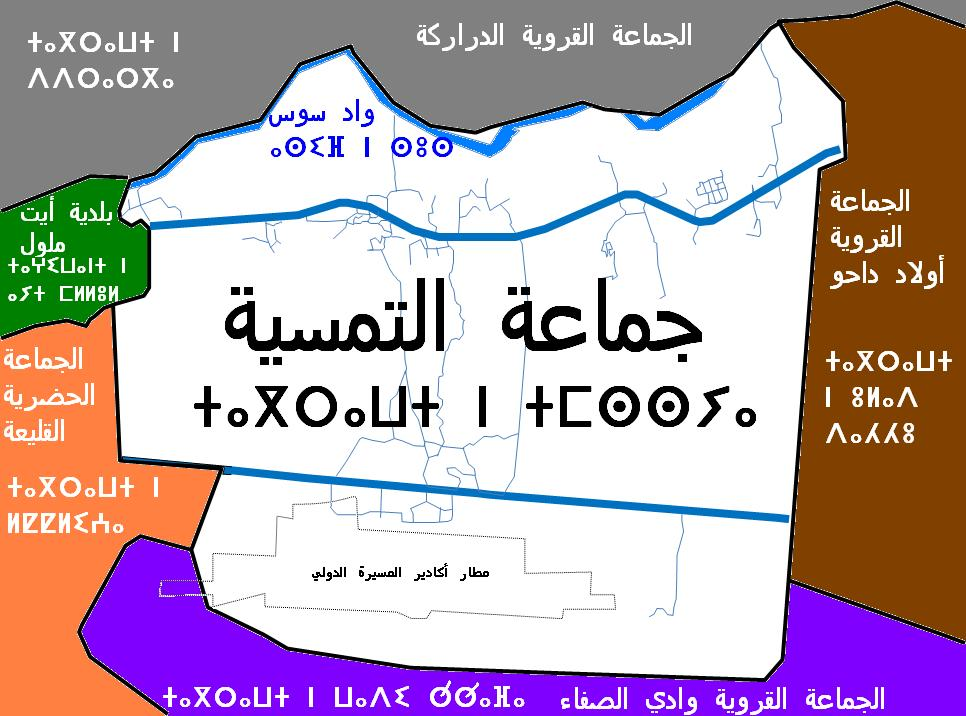
map of the commune of Temsia
