= Ain el Madiour =

- small town
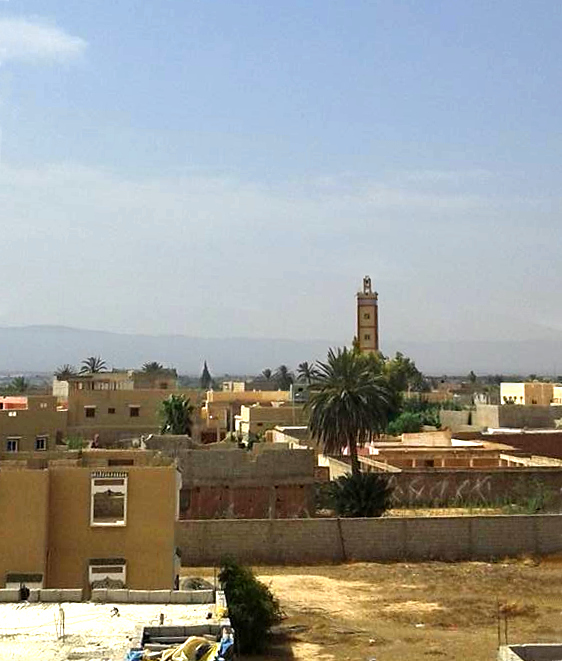

- Location in Morocco
- Coordinates: 30.4000°N 8.8833°W
- Country: Morocco
- Region: Souss-Massa
- Province: Taroudannt

Population (2004)
  - Total: 9,000
- Time zone: UTC+0 (GMT)

Ain el Madiour (Arabic عين المديور ) is one of the communes on the outskirts of Taroudannt city in the Souss-Massa region in Morocco. It is located at an altitude of 214 meters (702 feet) above sea level and within 569 kilometers (354 miles) south-west of the Moroccan capital Rabat. It is characterized by abundant citrus groves and other plantations, as well as being a strategic location on the highway that links Taroudannt, the western and southern parts and the region's capital city, Agadir. Ain el Madiour is the administrative headquarters of the Greater Machraa El Ain's commune.

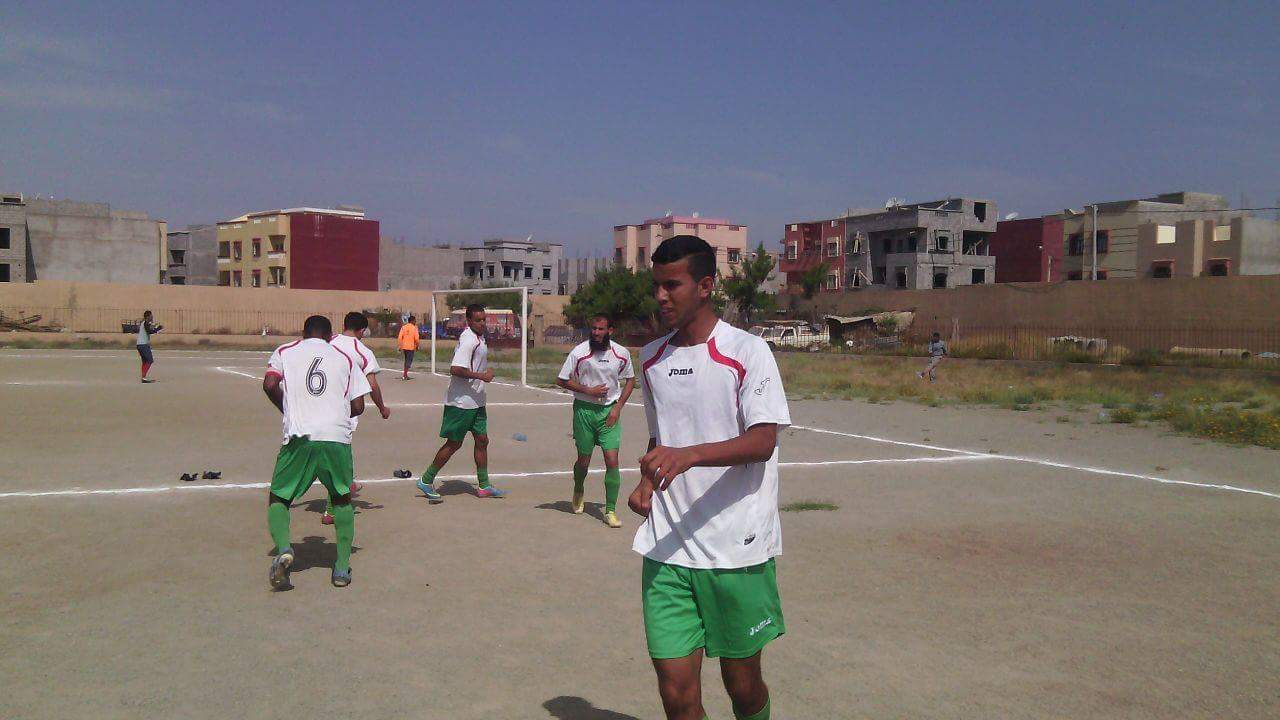
Soccer training on the ungrassed football field of Ain el Madiour

== Geographical location ==
Ain el Madiour is located in the northwestern part of the Souss-Massa-Draa region, Morocco, between Longitude "36.'24 0.30 degrees North and latitude" 0.'54 8 degrees West. And between -8.9 and 3.40 decimal degrees.

It is bordered to the west with the villages Akfai, Sidi Abdellah Ou Said and Sidi Moussa Lhamri. On its northern side lies Sidi Blerahuzei, Oulad Halouf, Sidi Amara and Taroudannt city. On the east Oulad Abbou, Oulad Rhhou, Oulad Teima, Tazemmourt and on the south Hafaia en Adar.

== Topography ==
Ain el Madiour is located at an altitude of 214 meters (702 feet) above sea level in the Souss Massa Basin near Haouz plain, on a sparse plain interspersed with hills and rocky sporadic outcrops and side valleys - notably Tefnut (Ousef Tefnut) on the east and Ousef Anofrao which lies in a distance of about 9 kilometers (5.6 miles), Ousef Amn Tacanut and Wadi Hawuar, which lies about 15 kilometers (9.3 miles) from Ein el Madiour. The High Atlas Mountains are located to the south and southeast of the town, and supply runoff from melted ice and precipitation that descends to the wadis and to the ocean. This water replenishes the bulk of the groundwater in the area and enables agricultural production.

== Temperatures ==
The climate in the region belongs to the continental climate, which is characterized by high temperatures and drought in the summer. The temperature reaches its peak in July and August, where more than 30 degrees Celsius on average reaching up to 45 degrees Celsius, which sometimes leads to dust storms when a cold air with moisture coming from Agadir in the west collides with the dry hot air of the semi desert region. During the winter months the temperature drops especially in December and January where a record of less than 8 °C (46 °F) has been recorded.

Precipitation of rain occurs in the winter season, especially in the month of December where it reaches to more than 60 millimeters (2.4 in). February and March are also rainy months. Rainfall is always brief and rapid, whereas abundant water from the mountains flows to the gullies and valleys causes flooding on desiccated land. There is no rain in the summer season.

The town's geographical location near the Atlas Mountain ranges promotes moist warm wind blowing from Sous River basin and leads to the formation of a layer of ground fog in the morning, which gradually disappear during the day hours followed by bright sunlight.

== Economy ==
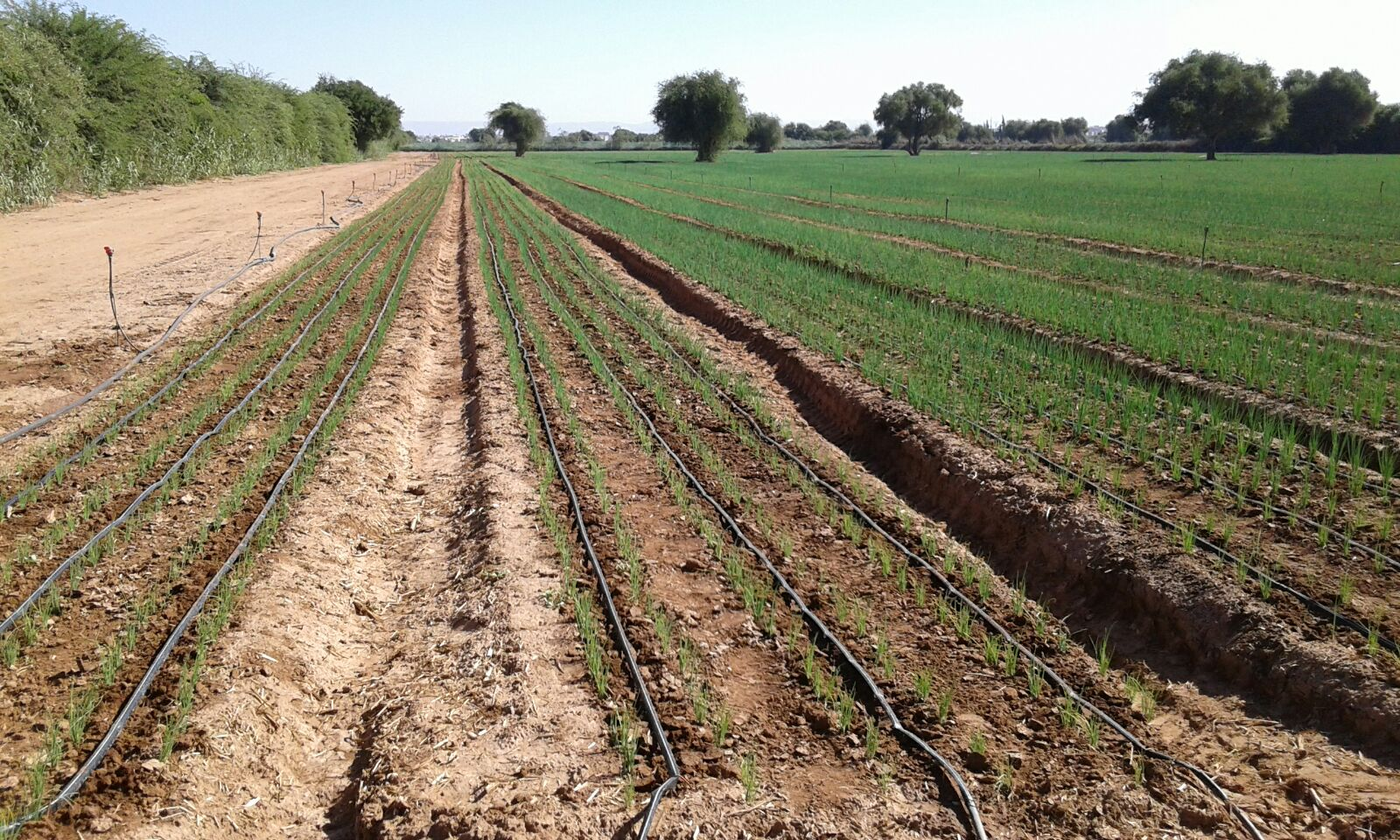
Onion's fields at Ain el Madiour

Agriculture is the main economic sector in Ain el Madiour, and a large part of the population works meeting domestic demand and exporting surplus products to neighboring regions. The products consist of agricultural crops, particularly vegetables and citrus fruits. The town boasts many productive farms and estates where a large part of the local population works. Others work in the local market or in more specialised trades, especially in craft production, construction and beekeeping.

There is no industry in the village. There is a small grinding mill. Local weekly open-air markets, the so-called souk exist in the vicinity. One is a "Sunday Market" held in Taroudannt city and another, "Saturday market» in El Guerdane. Both markets are located within a short distance of Ain el Madiour.

== Tourism ==
Located between two important tourist attractions in Morocco Agadir and Taroudannt, the town attracts visitors seeking a quiet rural place to stay. There are two tourist-classified hotels. Most visitors are Europeans, particularly French and Italian. Some Europeans own residential plantations.
