= Municipal stadium of Ait Melloul =

Football stadium in Morocco

The municipal stadium of Ait Melloul is a football stadium located in the city of Ait Melloul in Morocco. It is the main stadium for Union Ait Melloul and can host up to 5,000 fans.
