= Machraa El Ain =

- Rural commune and town
- Location within Morocco
- Country: Morocco
- Region: Souss-Massa-Drâa
- Province: Taroudant Province

Population (2004)
  - Total: 9,832
- Time zone: UTC+0 (GMT)

Machraa El Ain is a small town and rural commune in Taroudant Province of the Souss-Massa-Drâa region of Morocco. At the time of the 2004 census, the commune had a total population of 9832 people living within 1756 households. The administrative headquarter of the Commune is in Ain el Madiour.
