= Dcheira El Jihadia =

Dcheira El Jihadia الدشيرة الجهادية ⴷⵛⴰⵔⴰ ⵍⵊⵉⵀⴰⴷⵉⵢⴰ
- City
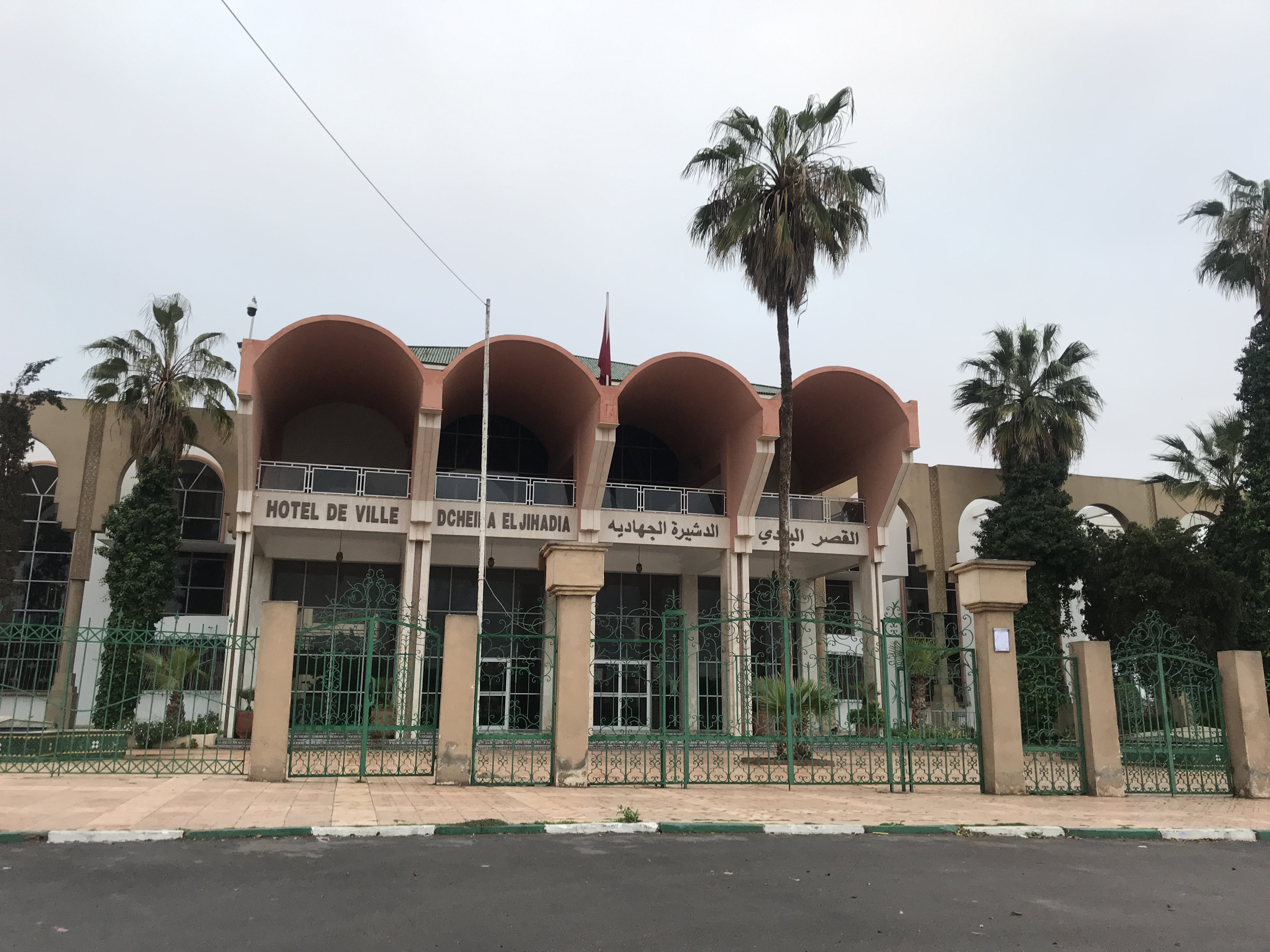
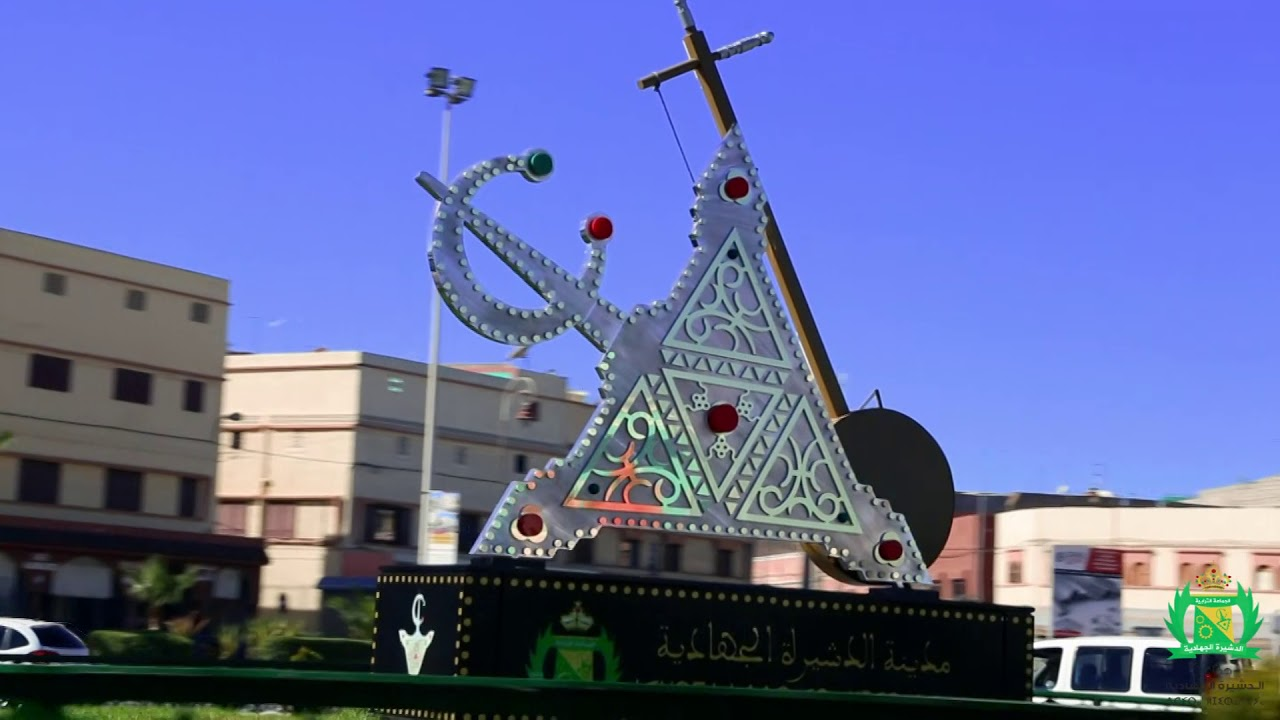
- Interactive map of Dcheira El Jihadia
- Coordinates: 30°22′15″N 9°31′57″W
- Country: Morocco
- Region: Souss-Massa
- Prefecture: Inezgane-Aït Melloul

Population (2024)
  - Total: 113,041
  - Rank: 33rd in Morocco
- Time zone: UTC+0 (GMT)

Dcheira El Jihadia (Arabic: الدشيرة الجهادية) is a city in southern Morocco. It is located in the prefecture of Inezgane-Aït Melloul in Morocco's Souss-Massa region, 10 km south of the region's largest city of Agadir. The 2024 Moroccan census recorded 113,041 people living in 30,582 households.
