= Aït Melloul =

Aït Melloul ⴰⵢⵜ ⵎⵍⵍⵓⵍ أيت ملول
- City
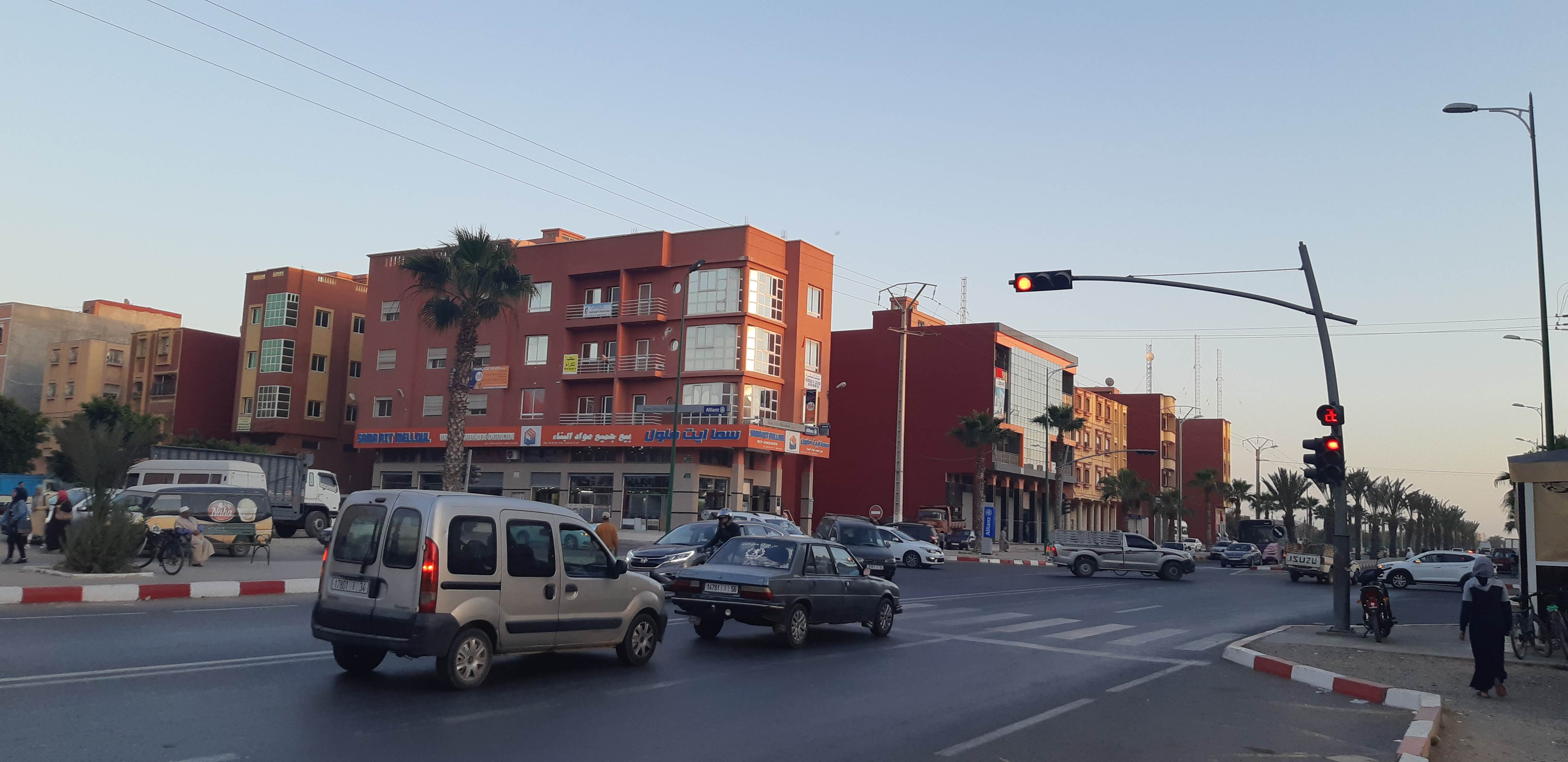
- Interactive map of Aït Melloul
- Coordinates: 30°20′03″N 9°29′50″W
- Country: Morocco
- Region: Souss-Massa
- Prefecture: Inezgane-Aït Melloul

Government
  - Mayor: Hicham El Kaissouni

Area
  - Total: 40 km^{2} (15 sq mi)
- Highest elevation: 26 m (85 ft)
- Lowest elevation: 22 m (72 ft)

Population (2024)
  - Total: 210,870
  - Density: 5,300/km^{2} (14,000/sq mi)
- Time zone: UTC+0 (GMT)
- Postal code: 86150
- Area code: +212
- Website: aitmelloul.ma

Aït Melloul (Arabic: أيت ملول) (Standard Moroccan Tamazight: ⴰⵢⵜ ⵎⵍⵍⵓⵍ) is a city on the west coast of Morocco. It is located in the suburban area of Agadir just southeast of Inezgane, on the southern bank of the Sous River. According to the 2024 census, the city is home to 210,870 inhabitants and 53,781 households. It is the most populous city in Inezgane-Aït Melloul Prefecture.

== Climate ==
Ait Melloul is characterized with a mild and temperate climate in general, sometimes hot and dry. The climate of the city is influenced by the air currents from the Atlantic Ocean. Dry currents from the south and hot winds from the Sahara also influence the climate and temperature of the city.

== Aït Melloul Bridge ==
The Aït Melloul Bridge (French: Pont d'Aït Melloul) is a prominent road bridge spanning the Souss River (Oued Souss), serving as a primary transportation link between Aït Melloul and Inezgane along National Route 1 (N1).

A road bridge was initially established at the location during the French Protectorate era to connect Agadir with southern Morocco. On 16 February 1956, severe flooding of the Souss River completely destroyed the original bridge span.

Between 1958 and 1959, a new reinforced concrete bridge was constructed. The 1959 design expanded the river crossing opening to 120 metres (390 ft) divided into three 40-metre spans anchored directly into bedrock. The bridge width was expanded to 17.5 metres to include vehicle lanes, pedestrian walkways, and dedicated lanes for regional agricultural transport.

== Transport ==
=== Air ===
Ait Melloul is home for Al Massira international airport which is one of the busiest airports in the south of Morocco.

== Sports ==
The largest football club of the city is Union Aït Melloul which is playing in the second division of the Moroccan football league. The team plays at the municipal stadium of Ait Melloul which can host up to 5,000 fans.

== Notable natives and residents ==
- Walid Azaro, professional footballer.

== Gallery ==
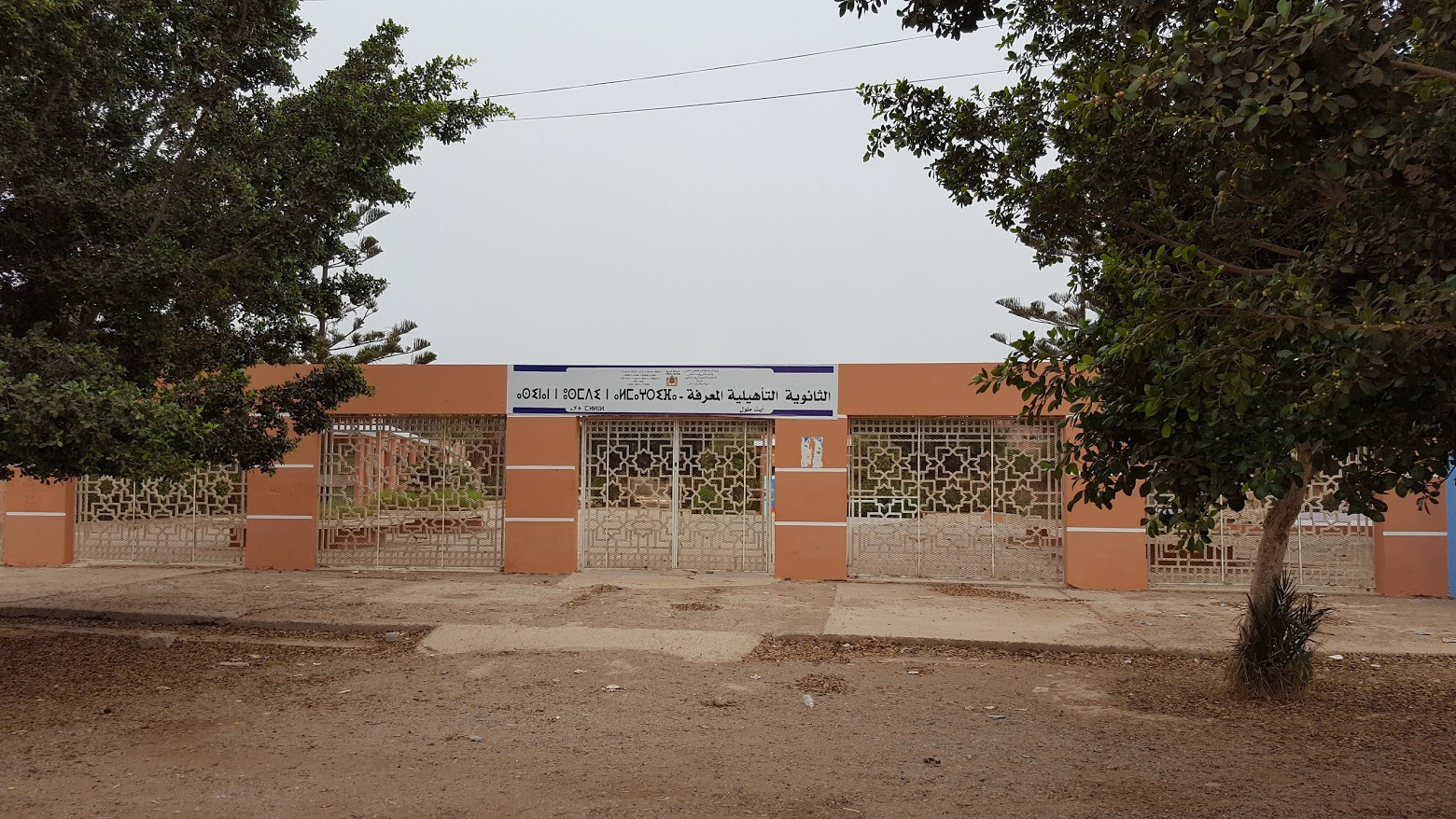
Almaarifa high school

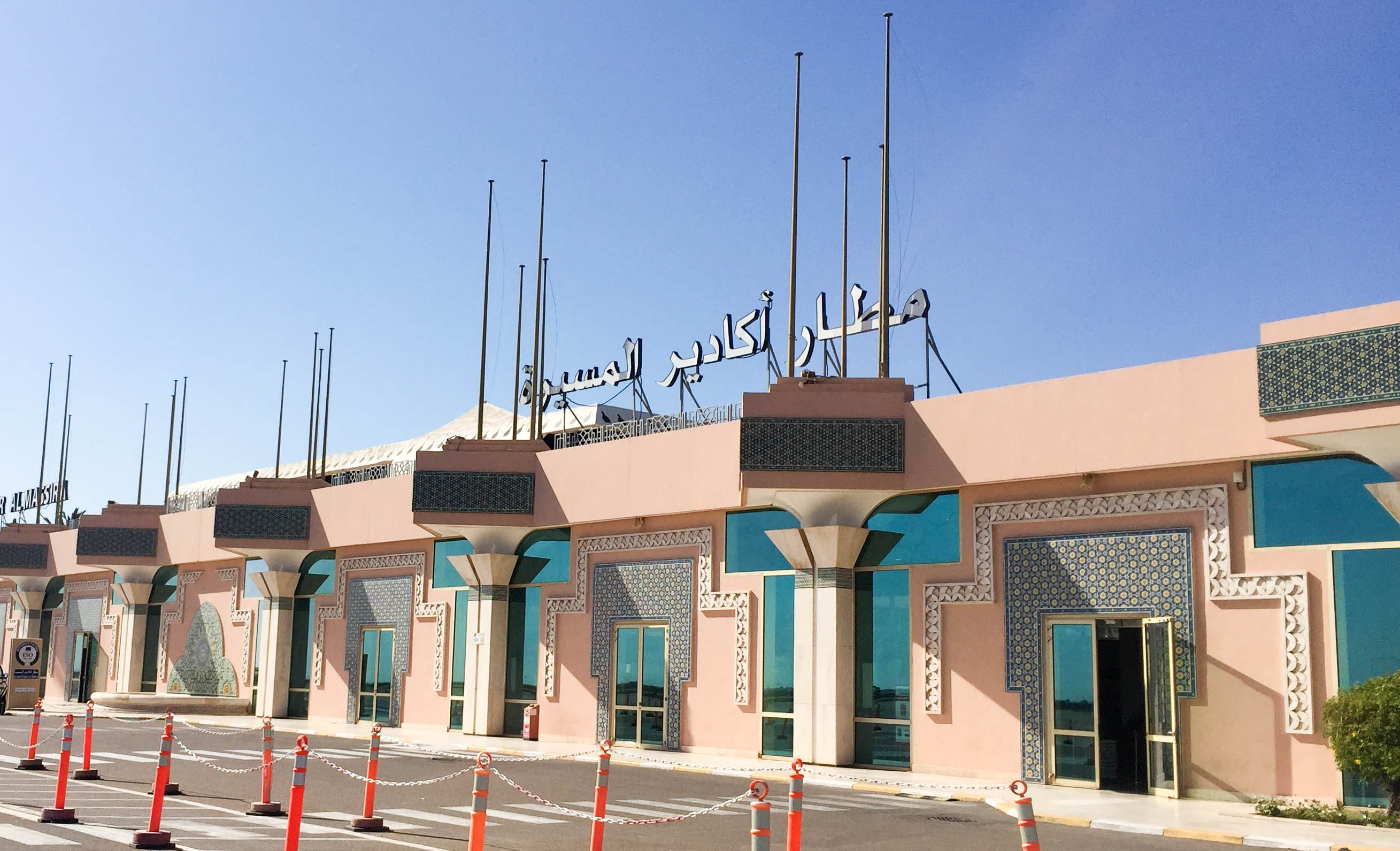
Almassira international airport

== See also ==
- Al Massira Airport
- Union Aït Melloul
- Prefecture of Inezgane-Aït Melloul
