= Inezgane-Ait Melloul Prefecture =

Inezgane-Ait Melloul Prefecture عمالة إنزكان آيت ملول ⵜⴰⵎⵏⴱⴰⴹⵜ ⵏ ⵉⵏⵣⴳⴳⴰⵏ ⴰⵢⵜ ⵎⵍⵍⵓⵍ
- Prefecture
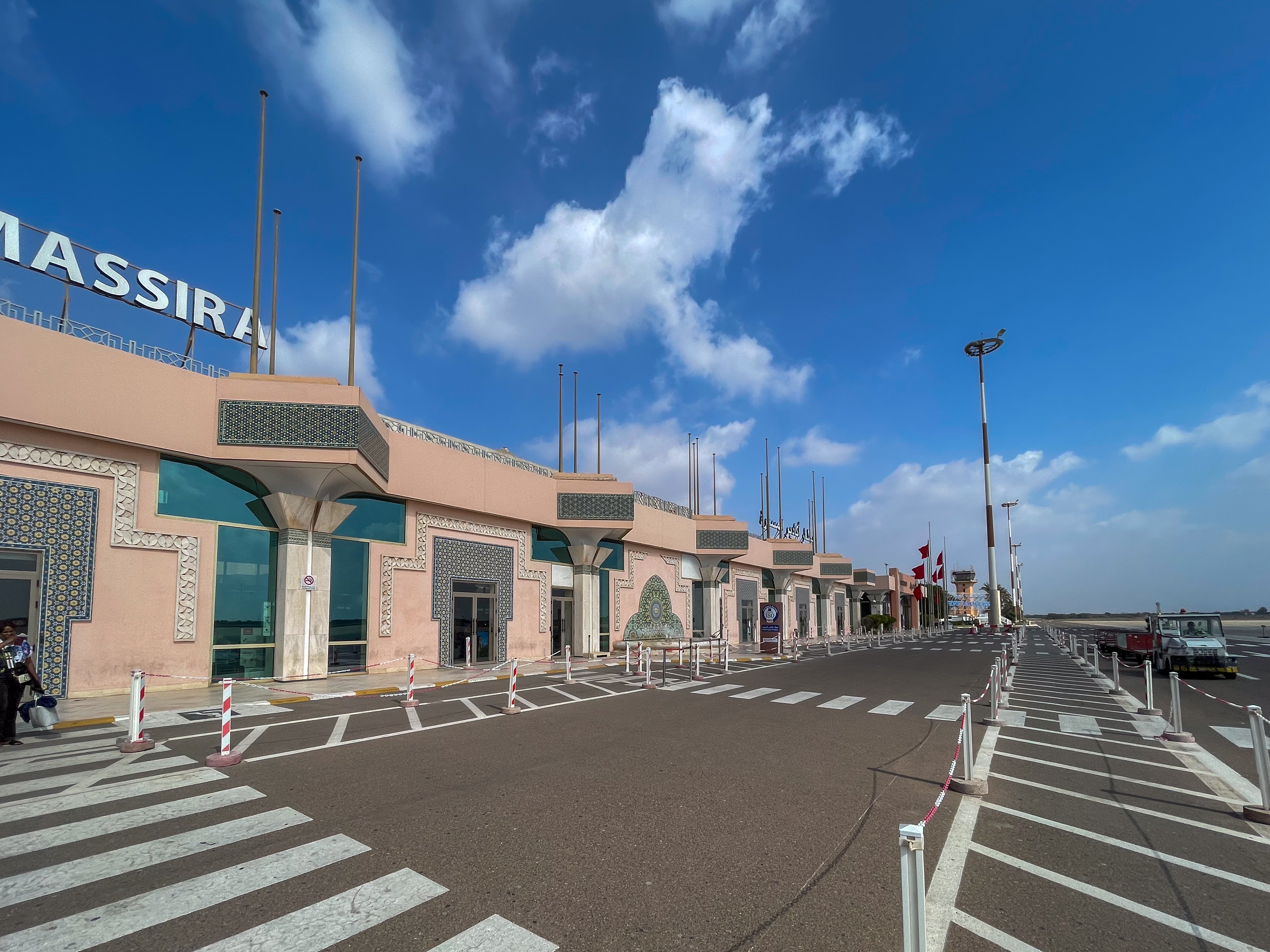
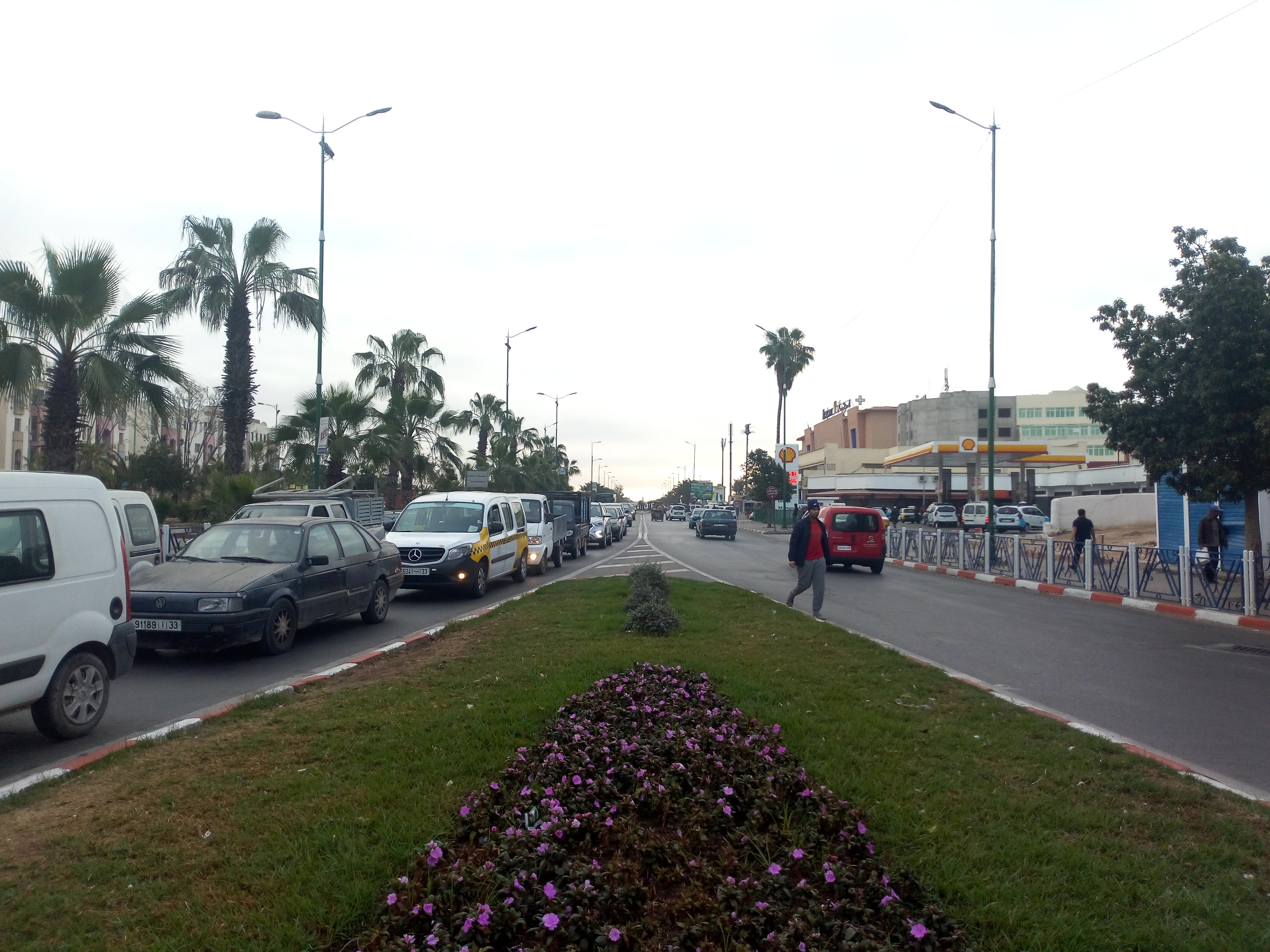
- Interactive map of Inezgane-Ait Melloul Prefecture
- Coordinates: 30°21′N 9°32′W
- Country: Morocco
- Region: Souss-Massa
- Capital: Inezgane

Area
  - Total: 293 km^{2} (113 sq mi)

Population (2024)
  - Total: 636,916
- Time zone: UTC+0 (GMT)

Inezgane-Ait Melloul (Standard Moroccan Tamazight: ⵉⵏⵣⴳⴳⴰⵏ ⴰⵢⵜ ⵎⵍⵍⵓⵍ, Arabic: إنزكان آيت ملول) is a prefecture of Morocco. Its capital is Inezgane.

== Subdivisions ==
Communes of Inezgane-Ait Melloul Prefecture

The prefecture is divided administratively into the following:

Name	Geographic code	Type	Households	Population (2004)
Ait Melloul	273.01.05.	Municipality	27,502	130,370
Dcheira El Jihadia	273.01.13.	Municipality	19,621	89,367
Inezgane	273.01.15.	Municipality	23,459	112,753
Lqliaa	273.05.17.	Rural commune	9606	47,837
Oulad Dahou	273.05.19.	Rural commune	2374	12,902
Temsia	273.05.27.	Rural commune	5224	26,385
