= Inezgane =

Inezgane إنزكان ⵉⵏⵣⴳⴳⴰⵏ
- City
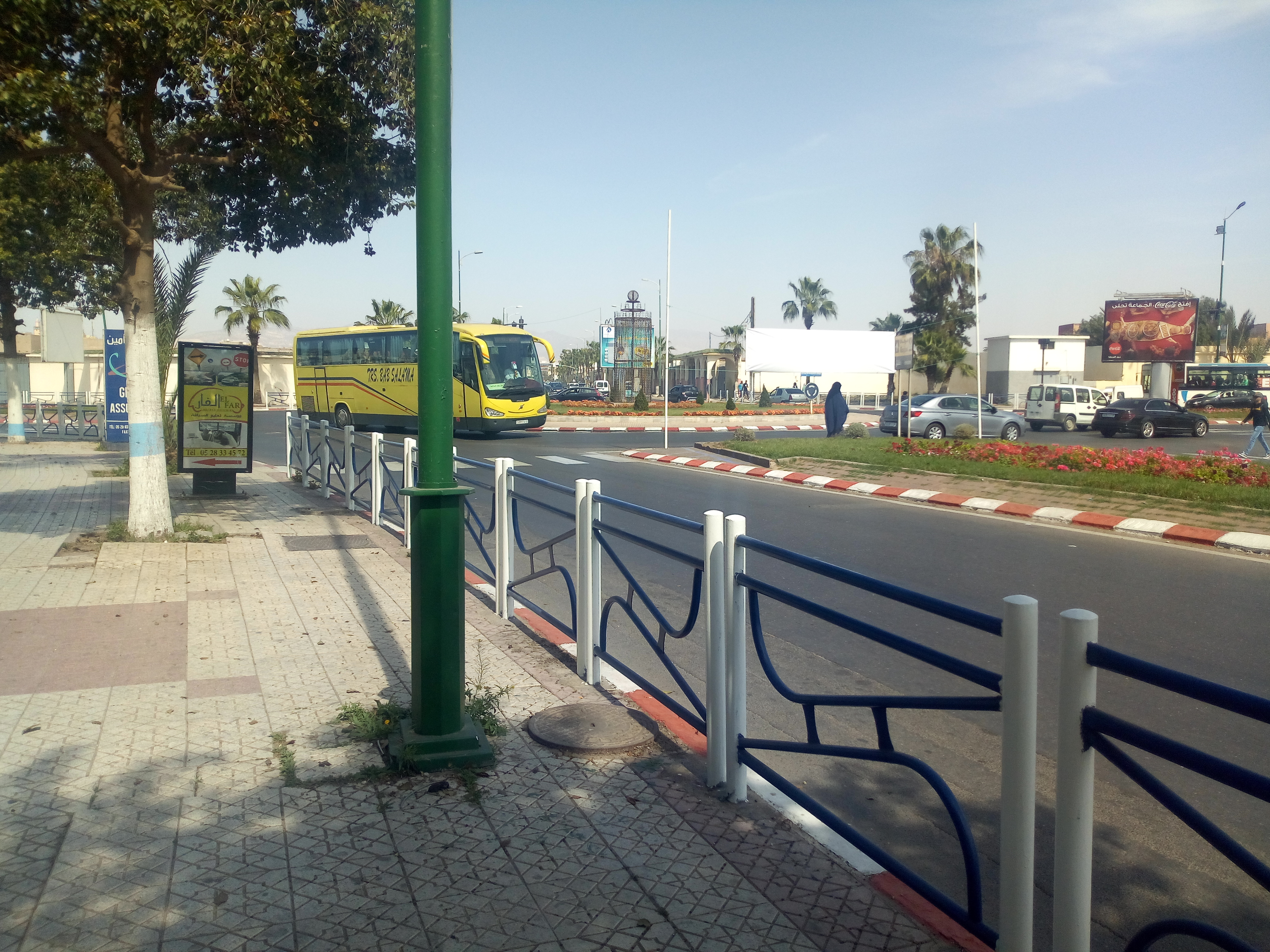
- Interactive map of Inezgane
- Coordinates: 30°21′10″N 9°32′17″W
- Country: Morocco
- Region: Souss-Massa
- Prefecture: Inezgane-Aït Melloul

Population (2014)
  - Total: 130,333
  - Rank: 25th in Morocco
- Time zone: UTC+0 (GMT)

Inezgane (Arabic: إنزكان; Standard Moroccan Tamazight: ⵉⵏⵣⴳⴳⴰⵏ) is the capital of Inezgane-Aït Melloul Prefecture located on the north bank of the Sous River, about 11.5 km (7.1 mi) south of Agadir, on the Atlantic Ocean coast of Morocco. It is in some ways a suburb to the larger Agadir, but unlike the tourism-centered Agadir, Inezgane is a typical Moroccan city. Located where the N1, N8 and N10 highways meet, Inezgane is an important transport hub in the region of Souss-Massa.

Inezgane is well known for its souks and silver jewellery, as well as for its vegetable, fruit, and spice market. Tuesday is the main market day, when people come from all the villages nearby to sell their goods and buy provisions for the week.

== Notable people ==
- Saadeddine Othmani, 16th Prime Minister of Morocco
- Jean-Yves Le Déroff, Athlete
- Aicha Tachinouite, Singer and dancer
- Ismail Amazal, Futsal player
