= Sous River =

Coordinates: 30°22′40″N 9°23′0″W

Sous River واد سوس ⴰⵙⵉⴼ ⵏ ⵙⵓⵙ
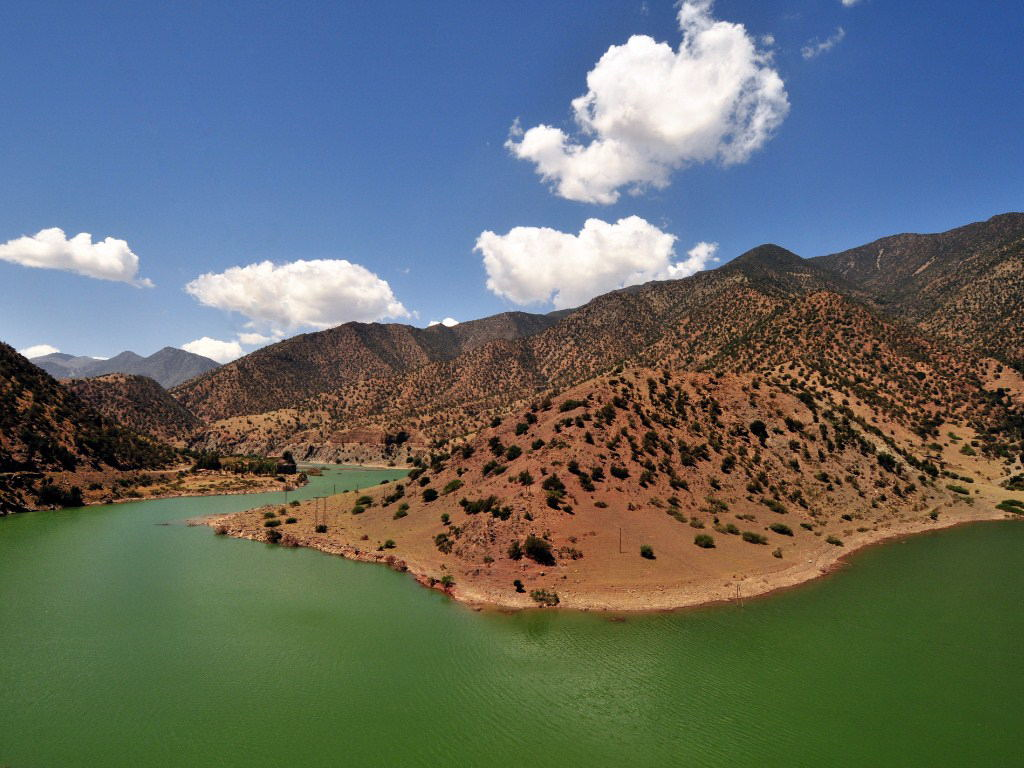
- Sous River near Taroudannt

Location
- Country: Morocco

Physical characteristics
- Source
  - location: High Atlas
- Mouth
  - location: Atlantic Ocean
- Length: 180 km (110 mi)

The Sous River, Sus River or Souss River (Arabic: واد سوس, romanized: wād sūs; Tachelhit: ⴰⵙⵉⴼ ⵏ ⵙⵓⵙ, romanized: asif n sus) is a river in mid-southern Morocco located in the Sous region. It originates in the High Atlas and flows west passing Aoulouz, Taroudannt, Oulad Teima, Inezgane and Aït Melloul. It forms a basin which is protected from the desert climate of the Sahara by the Anti-Atlas mountains and is one of Morocco's most fertile regions.

The Aoulouz Dam is the main dam on this river.

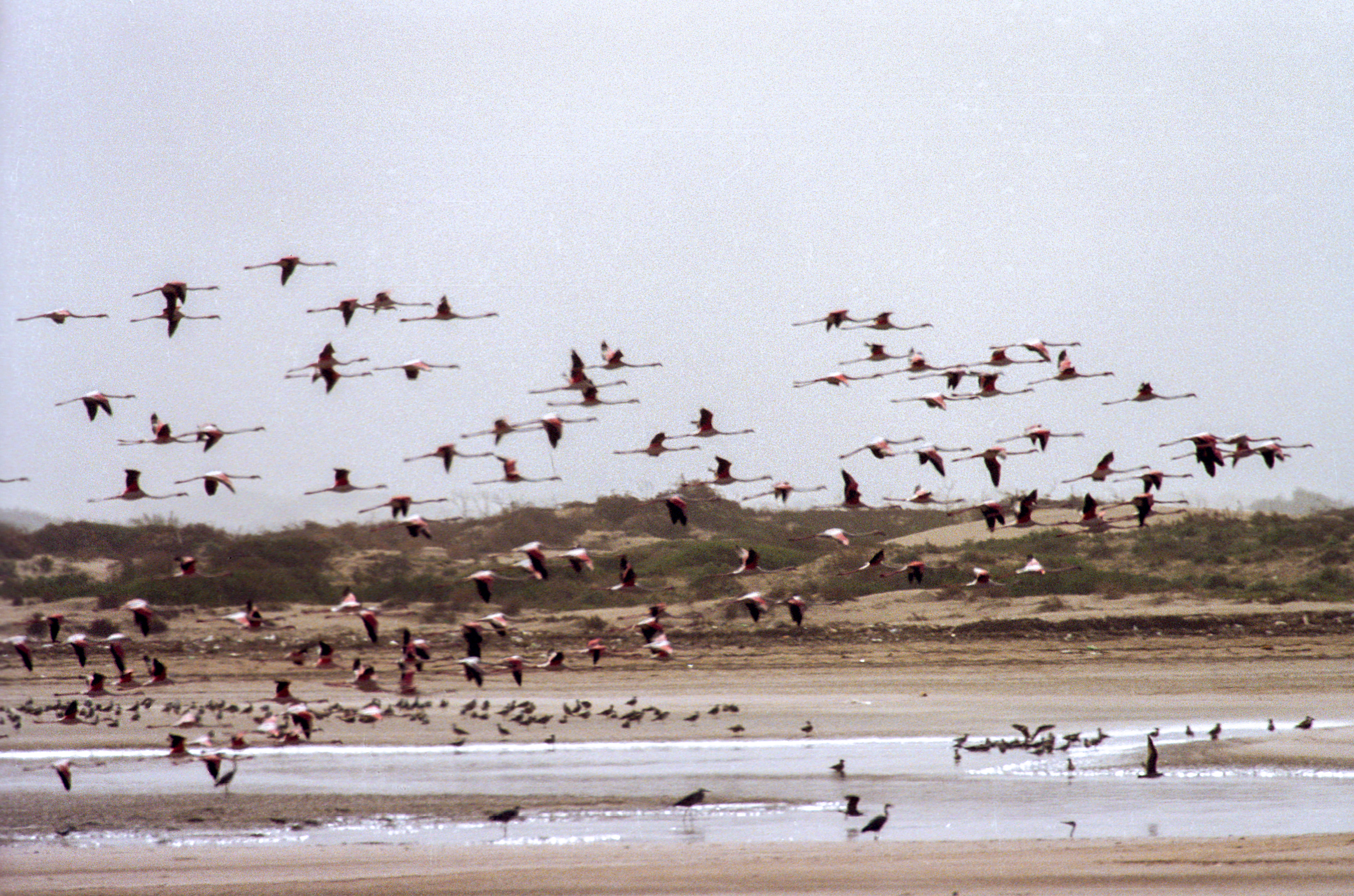
Sous River mouth near Agadir

== See also ==
- Sous
- Agadir
- Taroudannt
- Inezgan
- Ait Melloul
