= Adar, Morocco =

Coordinates: 30.15°N 8.366666°W

Adar
- Commune and town
- Interactive map of Adar
- Country: Morocco
- Region: Souss-Massa-Drâa
- Province: Taroudant Province

Population (2004)
  - Total: 5,098
- Time zone: UTC+0 (GMT)

Adar is a small town and rural commune in Taroudant Province of the Souss-Massa-Drâa region of Morocco. At the time of the 2004 census, the commune had a total population of 5098 people living in 1160 households.
