= National Route 10 (Morocco) =

Road in Morocco

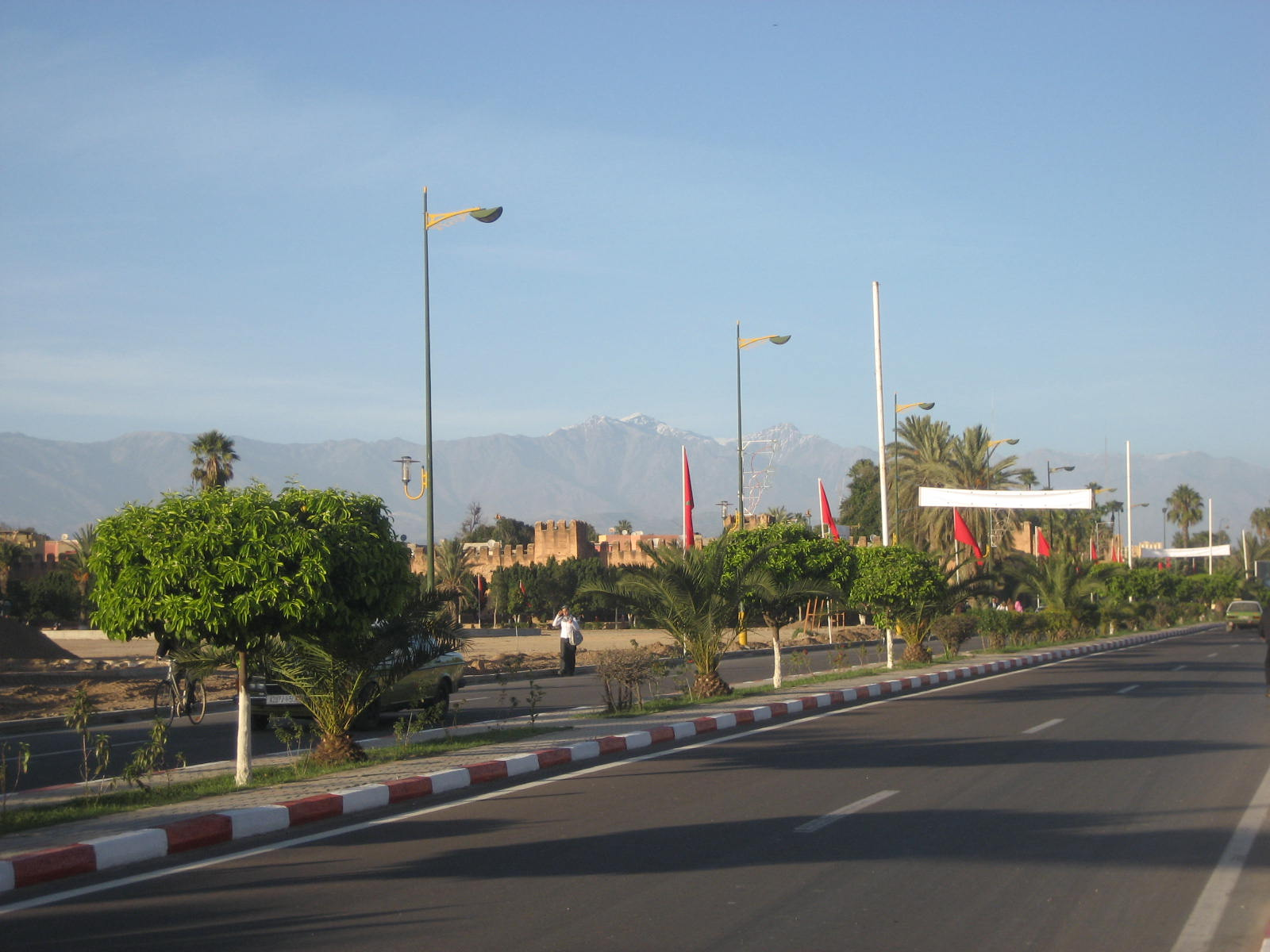
road

National route 10 is fully paved from Oujda to Agadir. Especially from Oujda to Errachidia there is very little traffic. Its total length is 653 km.
