= Ouislane =

Ouislane Wislan / ⵡⵉⵙⵍⴰⵏ
- municipality and town
- Interactive map of Ouislane
- Coordinates: 33.9107°N 5.4866°W
- Country: Morocco
- Region: Fès-Meknès
- Prefecture: Meknès

Population (2024)
  - Total: 112,180
- Time zone: UTC+0 (GMT)

Ouislane (Berber: Wislan) is a suburb of Meknes and municipality in Meknès Prefecture of the Fès-Meknès region of Morocco. The 2014 Moroccan census recorded a population of 87,910. At the time of the 2004 census, the commune had a total population of 47,824 people living in 9327 households.
