= Souk Sebt Ouled Nemma =

Souk Sebt Ouled Nemma أولاد النمة Oulad Nemma
- Municipality
- Interactive map of Souk Sebt Ouled Nemma
- Coordinates: 32.2948°N 6.7007°W
- Country: Morocco
- Region: Béni Mellal-Khénifra
- Province: Fquih Ben Salah

Population (2014)
  - Total: 60,076
- Time zone: UTC+0 (GMT)

Souk Sebt Ouled Nemma (Arabic: أولاد النمة Central Atlas Tamazight: ⵙⵓⵇ ⵙⴱⵜ ⵡⵍⴰⴷ ⵏⵎⵎⴰ Suq Sbt Wlad Nmma) is a town in Fquih Ben Salah Province, Béni Mellal-Khénifra, Morocco. It recorded a population of 60,076 in the 2014 Moroccan census, up from 51,049 in the 2004 census.
