= Lqliâa =

Lqliâa القليعة ⵍⵇⵍⵉⵄⴰ
- city
- Nickname: elkolea
- Interactive map of Lqliâa
- Coordinates: 30°17′27″N 9°27′58″W
- Country: Morocco
- Region: Souss-Massa
- Prefecture: Inezgane-Aït Melloul

Population (2024)
  - Total: 107,133
- Time zone: UTC+0 (GMT)

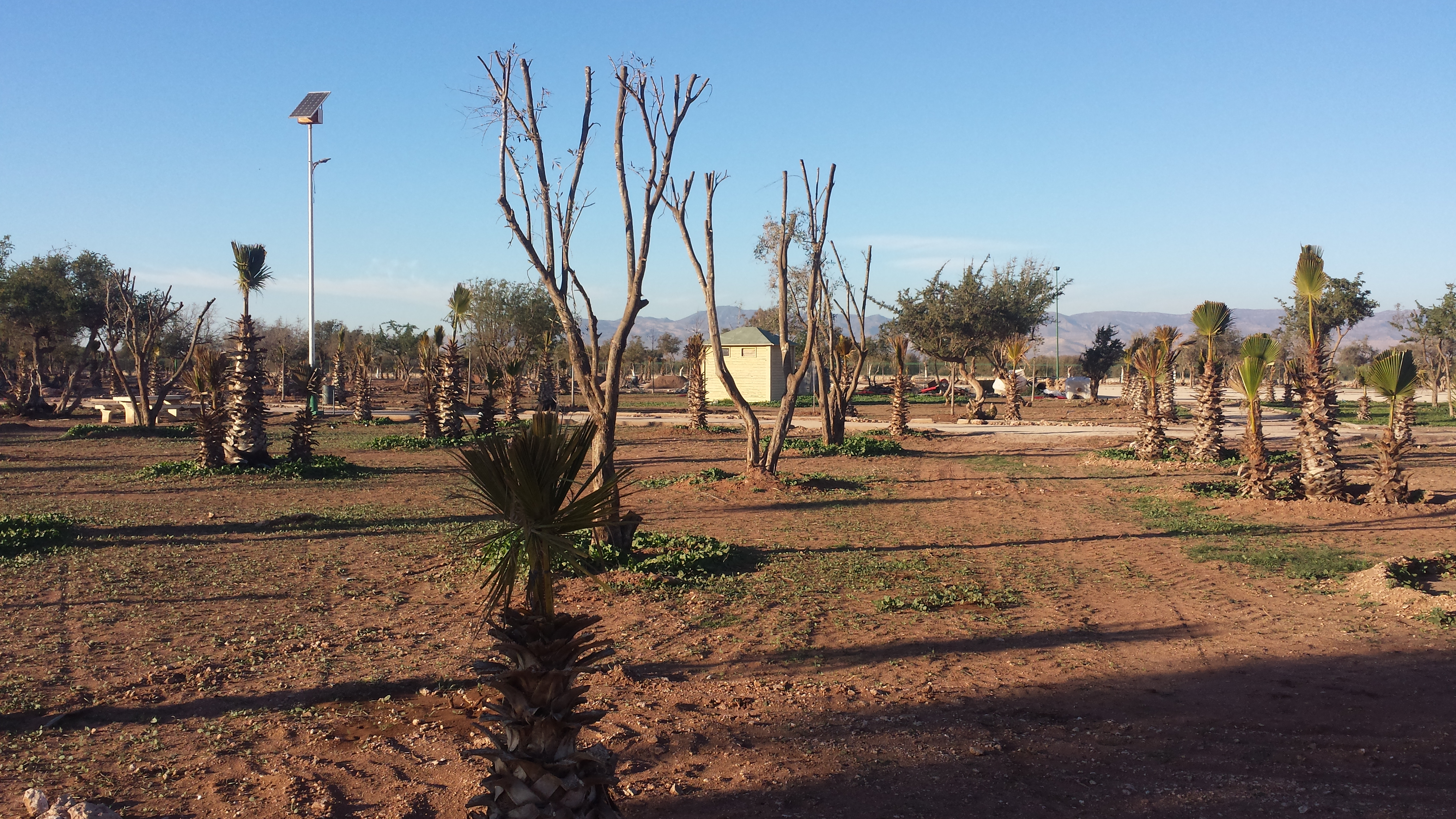

Lqliâa (Arabic: القليعة) is a city in Morocco, situated in the suburban area of Agadir. According to the 2024 Moroccan census it had a population of 107,133, up from 83,235 inhabitants in 2014, and 46,432 in the 2004 census.

== Notable people ==
- Mourad Batna, footballer.
