= Oulad Teima =

Oulad Teima أولاد تايمة Houara
- City
- Interactive map of Oulad Teima
- Country: Morocco
- Region: Souss-Massa
- Province: Taroudannt

Population (2024)
  - Total: 100,170
- Time zone: UTC+0 (GMT)

Oulad Teima (Arabic: أولاد تايمة), also known as Houara, is a city in Taroudant Province, Souss-Massa, Morocco. According to the 2024 Moroccan census it had a population of 100,170, up from 89,387 in 2014, and 66,183 in 2004.

== Vegetation ==
Ouled Teima is surrounded by agricultural areas marked by farms and fields with different crops. A belt formed by a forest area with a predominance of argans can also be noted.
