= Tafraout =

Tafraout تافراوت ⵜⴰⴼⵔⴰⵡⵜ
- Town
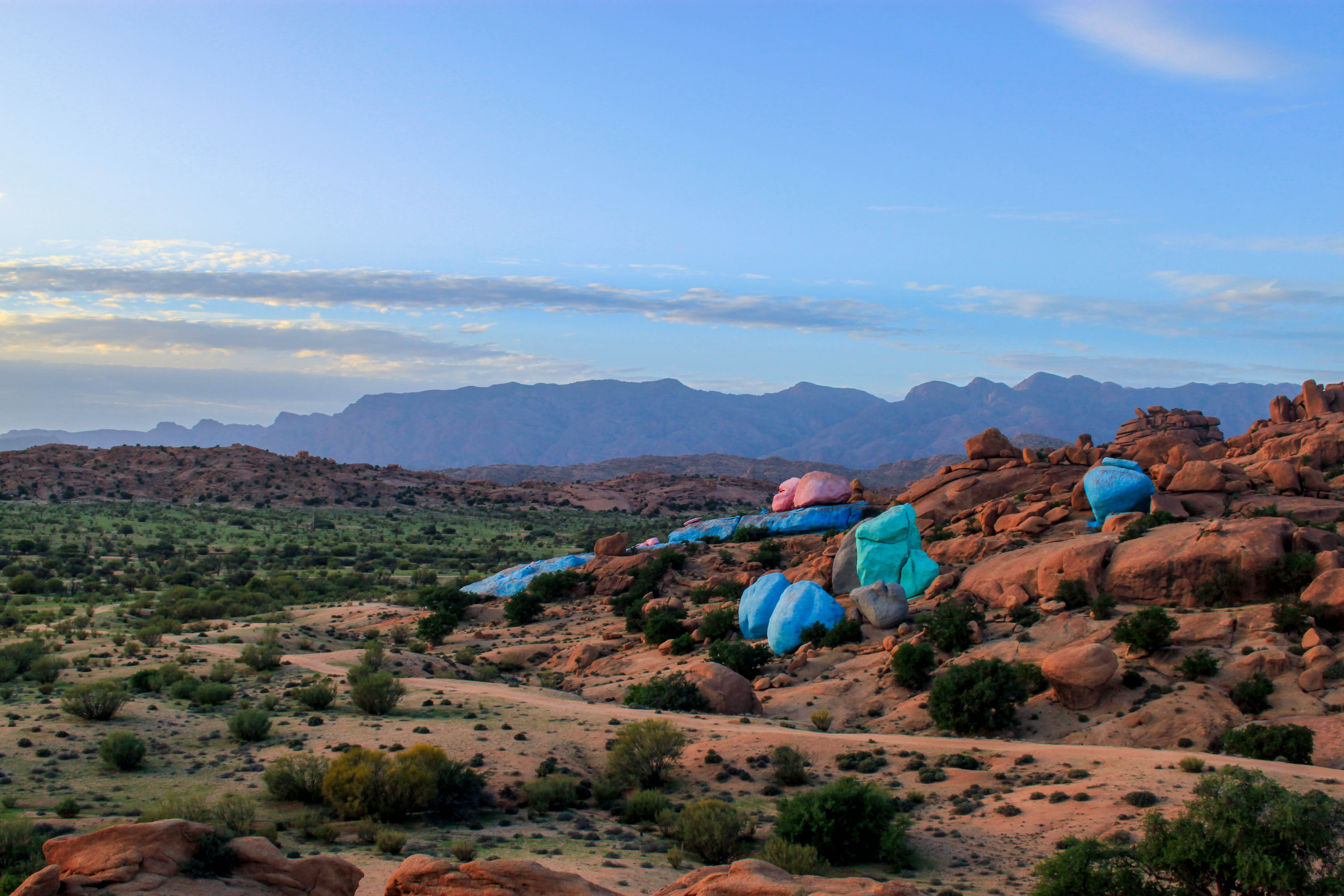
- Interactive map of Tafraout
- Coordinates: 29°43′N 8°58′W
- Country: Morocco
- Region: Souss-Massa
- Province: Tiznit Province

Population (2024)
  - Total: 6,124
- Time zone: UTC+0 (WET)
  - Summer (DST): UTC+1 (WEST)

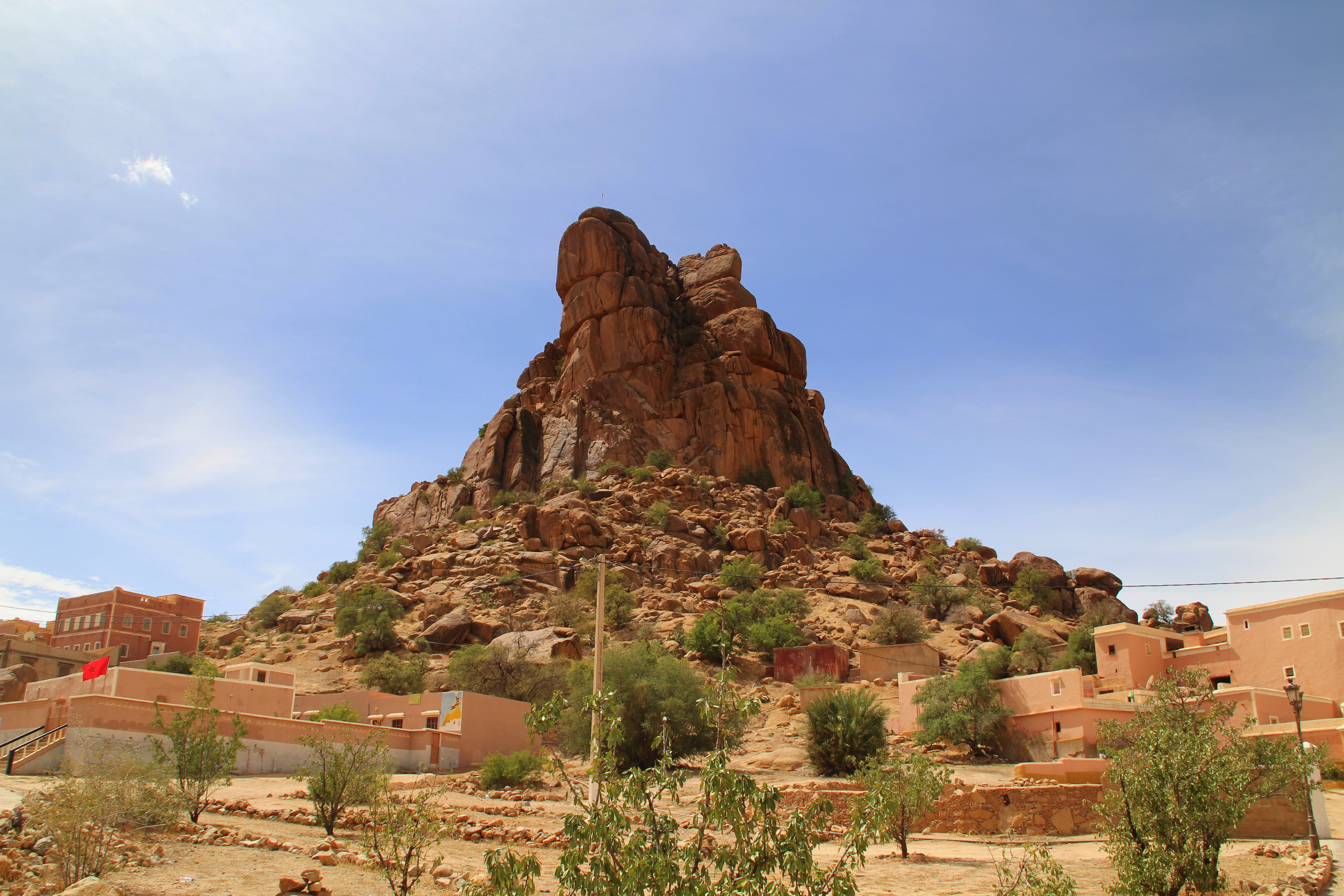
Napoleon's Hat in Tafraout

Tafraout, also Tafraoute (Arabic: تافراوت, Tachelhit: ⵜⴰⴼⵔⴰⵡⵜ) is a town in Tiznit Province, Souss-Massa region, Morocco. Situated in the central part of the Anti-Atlas mountains, a mountain range in Morocco which is part of the Atlas Mountains in the northwest of Africa, the town has a population of 6,124 at the 2024 census.

== Name and etymology ==
The basic meaning of the Shilha feminine noun tafrawt is "basin or cistern in which water drawn from a well is poured", with a derived meaning "valley". The centre of the town of Tafraout is actually situated in a small valley, at the foot of Djebel Lekest, a pink granite mountain formed by erosion. A male inhabitant is called in Shilha "u Tfrawt", (plural "ayt Tfrawt"); a female inhabitant is "ult Tfrawt", (plural "ist Tfrawt").

The area is surrounded by mountains and olive and almond groves, as well as argan and fig trees.

== Notable people ==
- Aziz Akhannouch: Prime Minister of Morocco
- Mohamed Lahyani: Moroccan-Swedish Tennis umpire
- Mohammed Khaïr-Eddine: Moroccan-Amazigh poet and writer

== See also ==
- Tughrassen
