= Tughrassen =

Village in Morocco

Coordinates: 29°34′41″N 8°59′39″W

Tughrassen is a small village located 17 km south of Tafraout in the Anti-Atlas mountain range in Morocco.

== Gallery ==
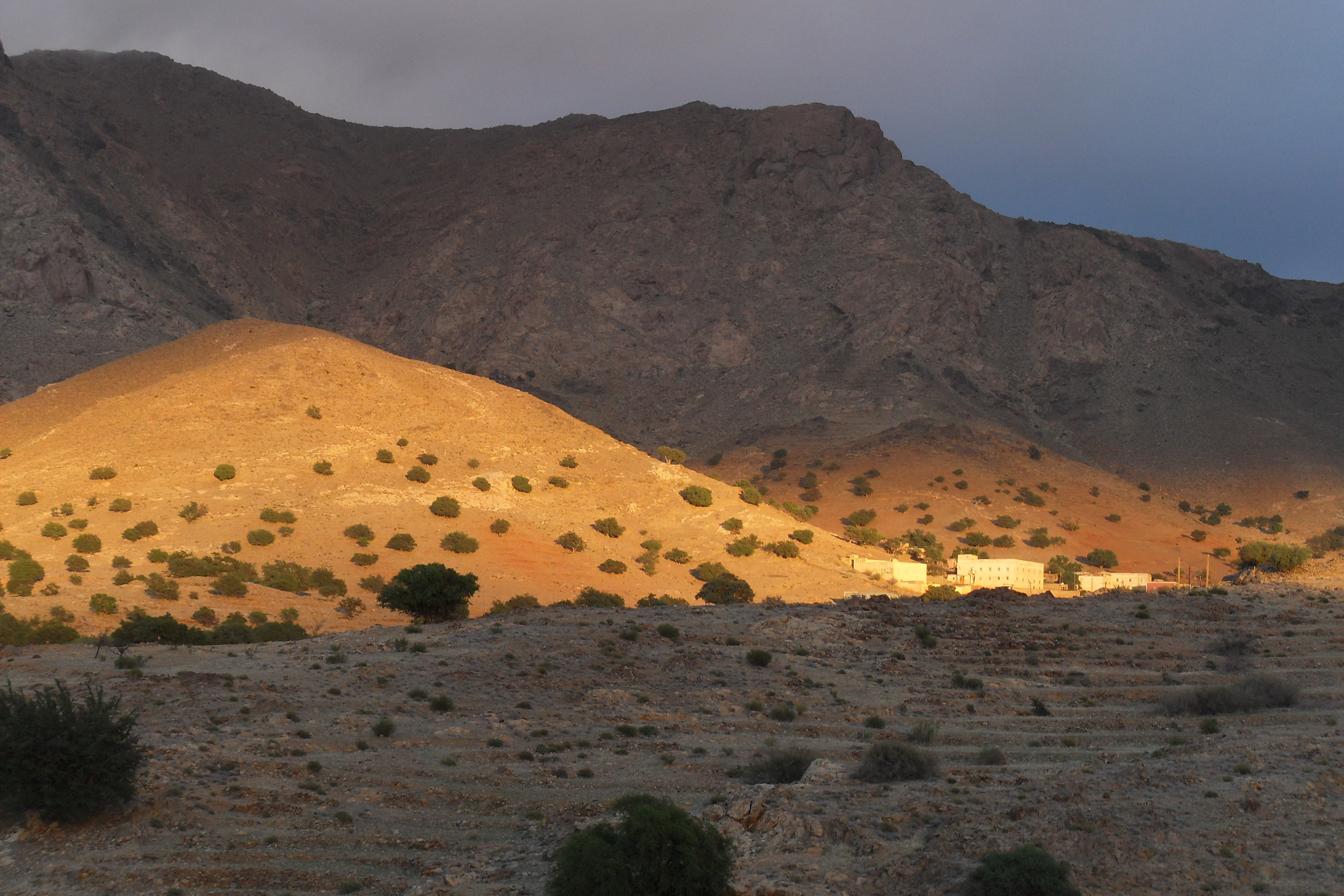

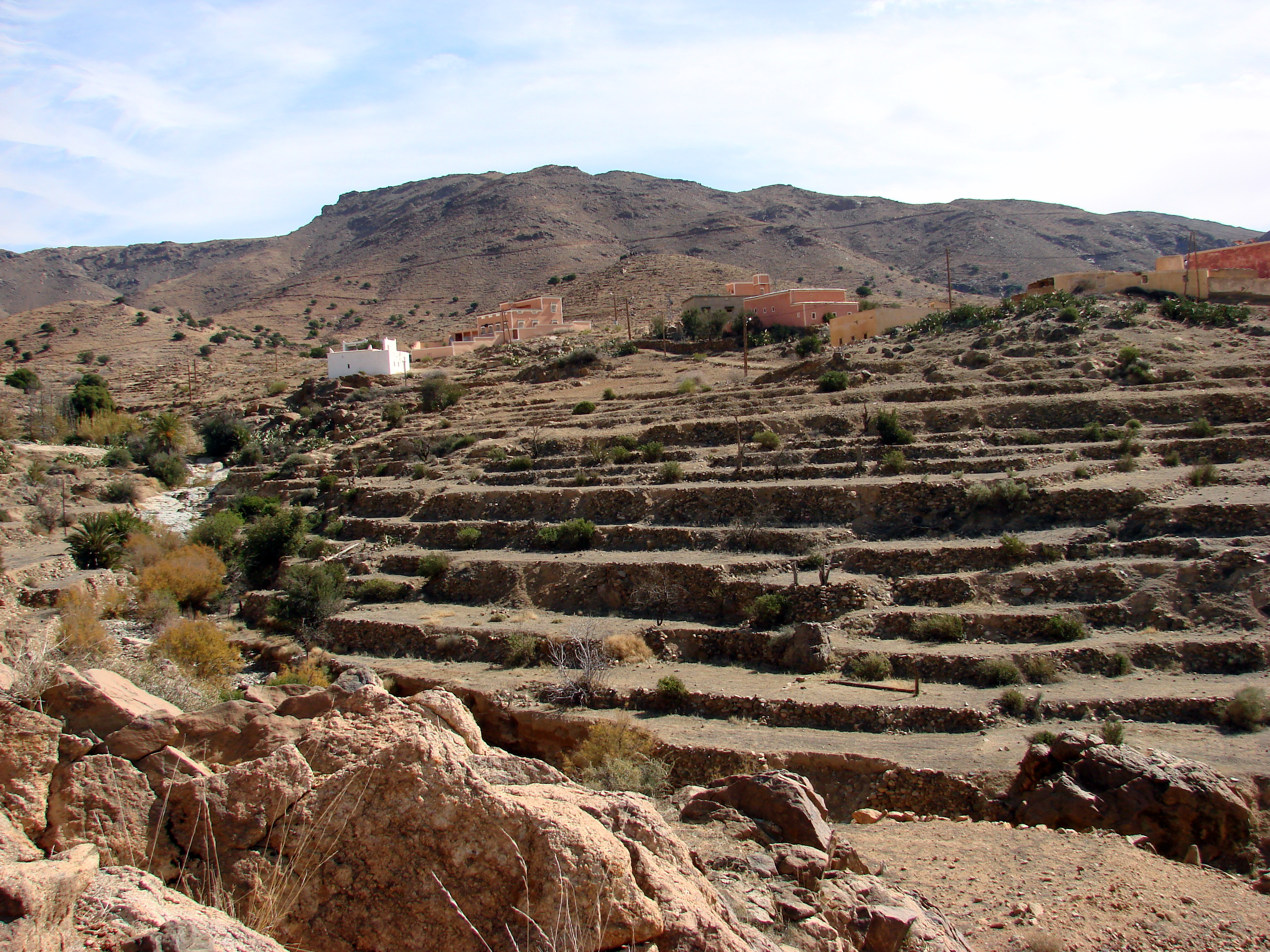
Tighrassen Village, Tafraout

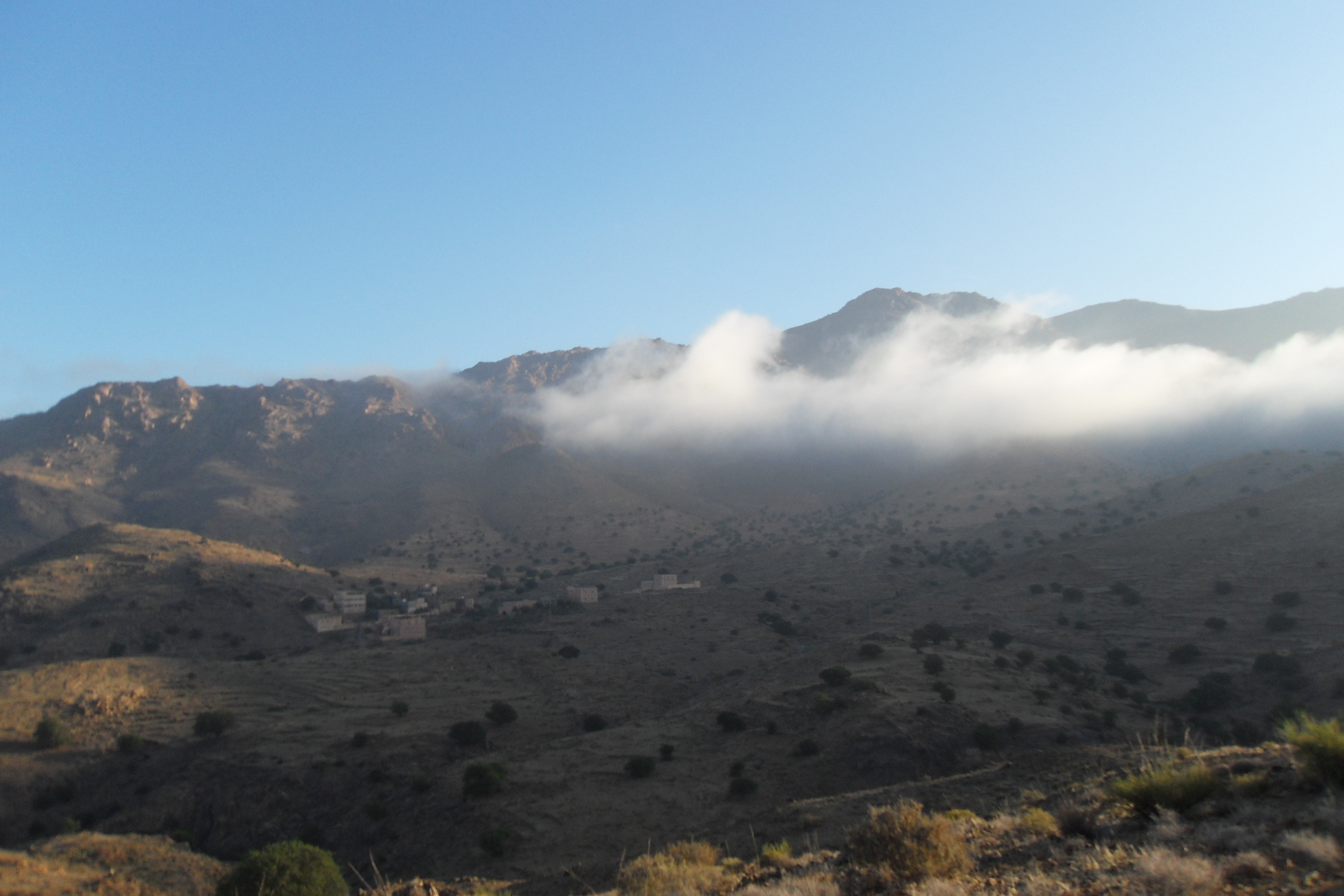

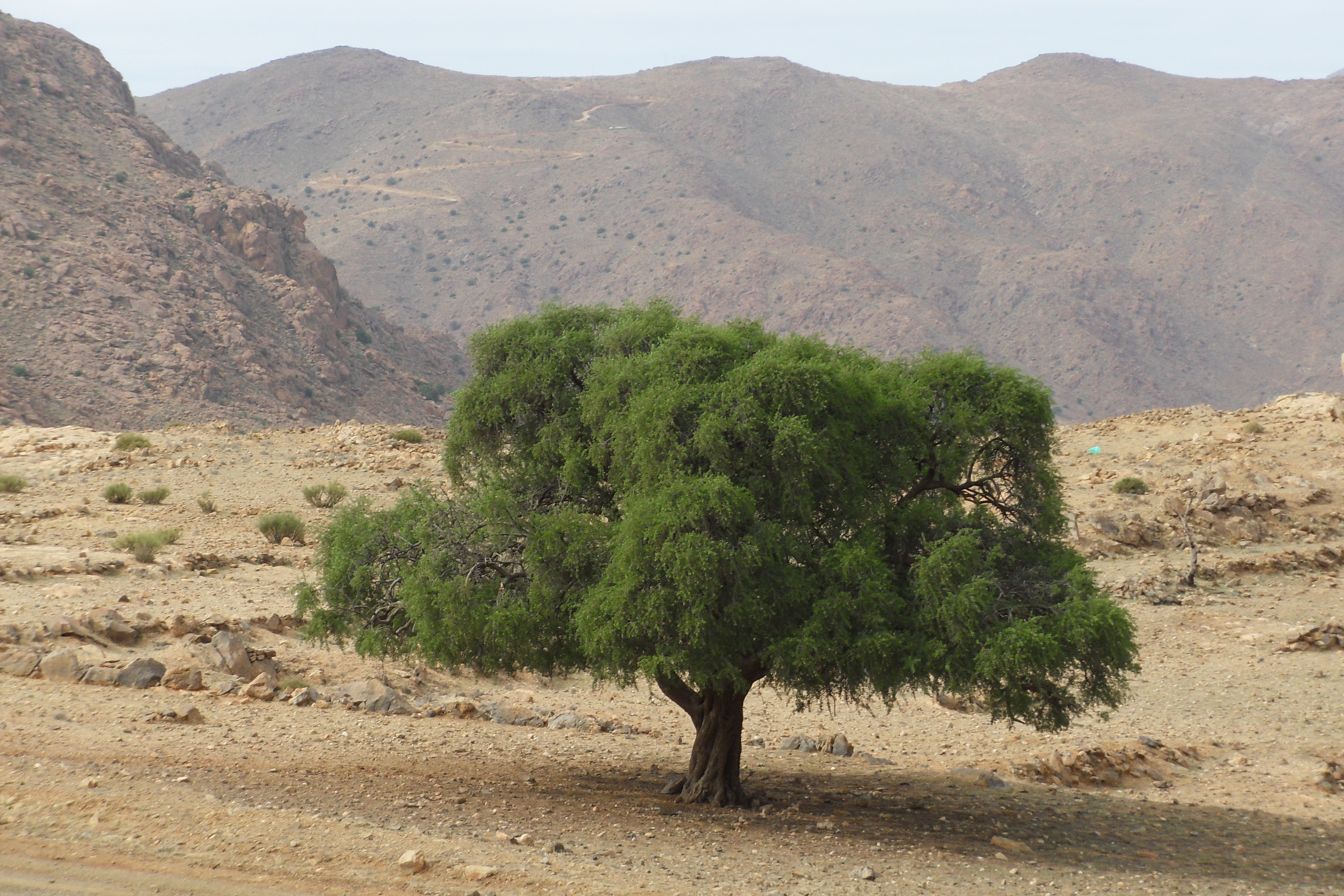

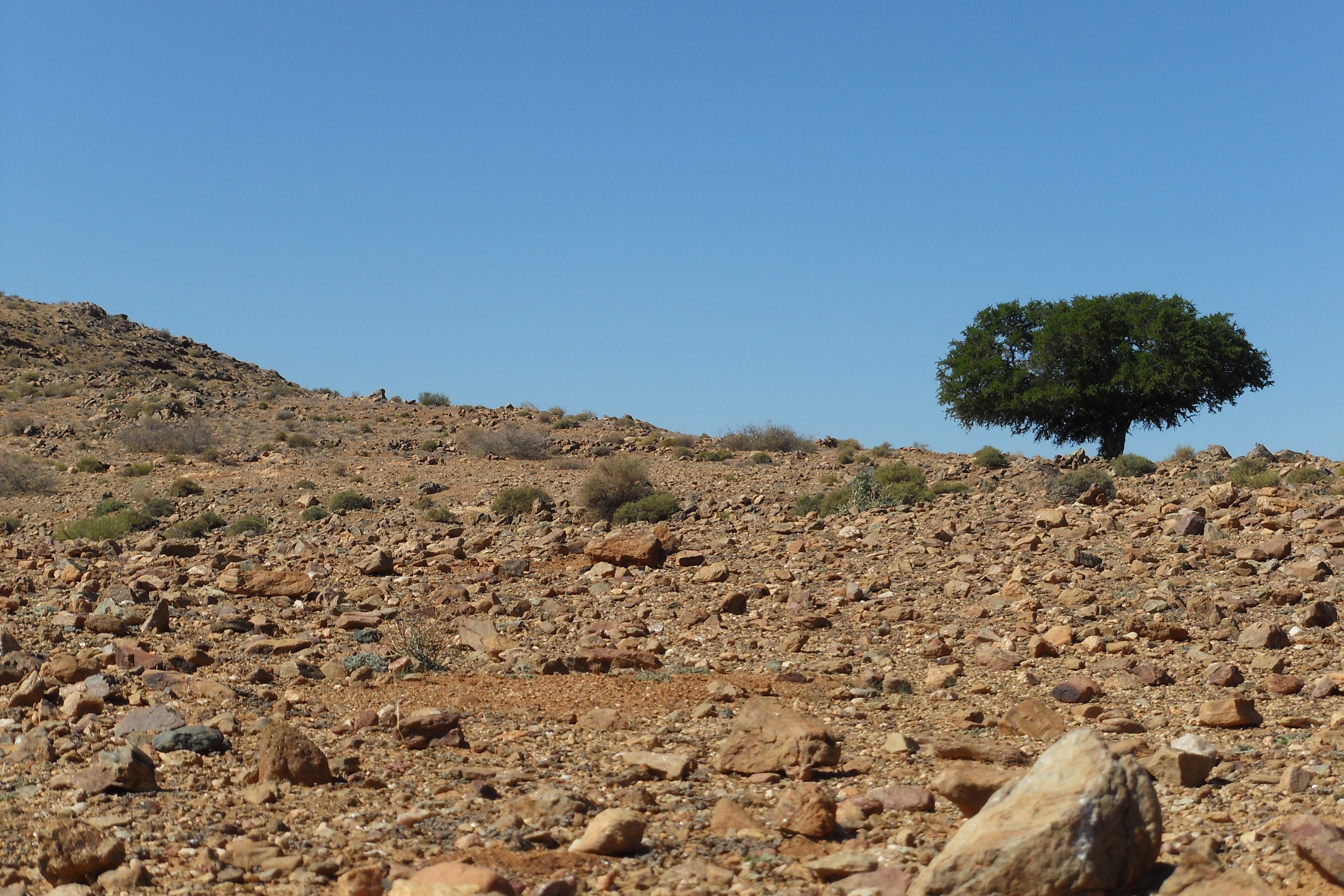

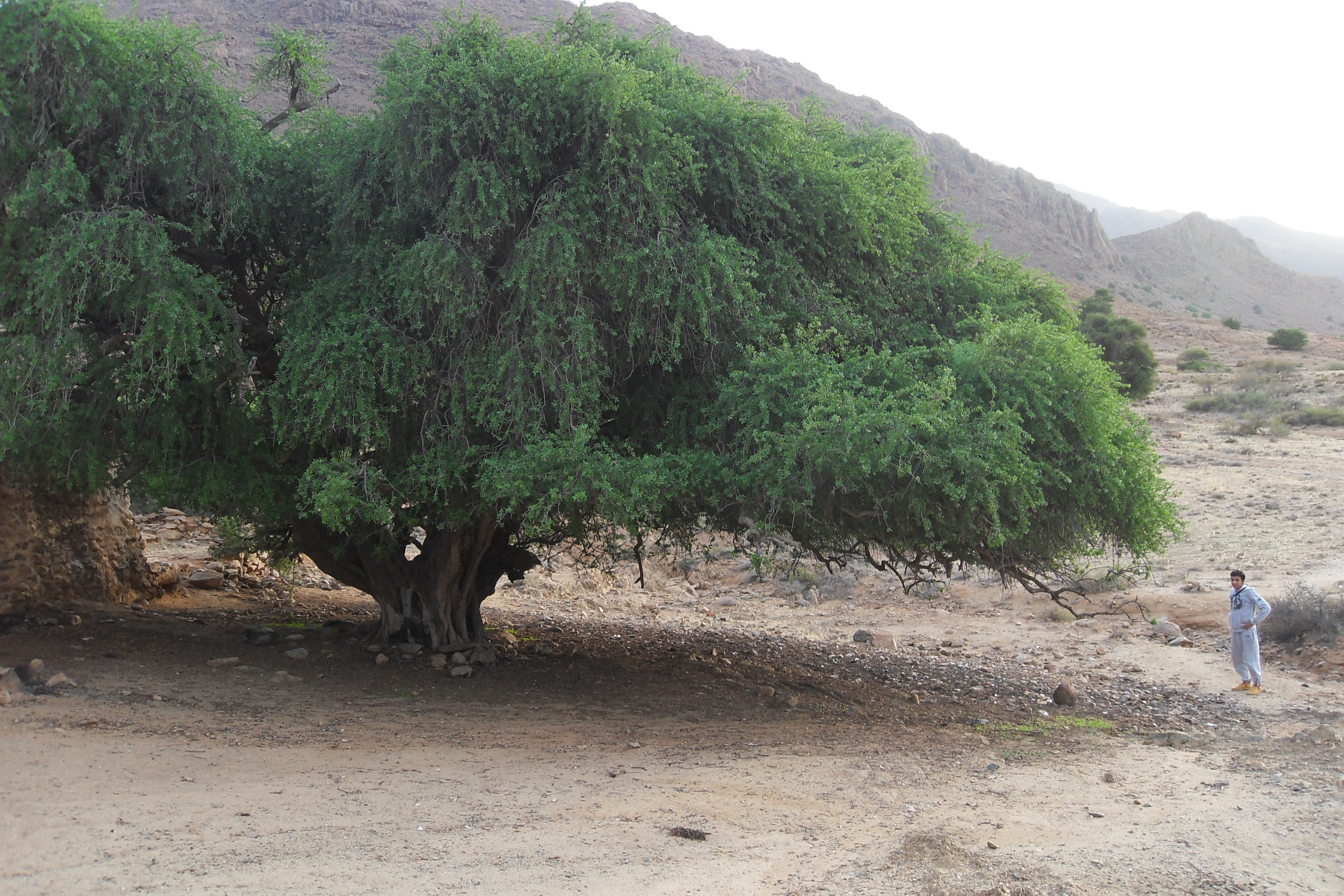
