= Jbel Sirwa =

Mountain in Morocco

Adrar n Sirwa
- Siroua
- View of Jbel Sirwa's peak

Highest point
- Elevation: 3,304 m (10,840 ft)
- Coordinates: 30°40′14″N 07°37′17″W

Naming
- Native name: ⴰⴷⵔⴰⵔ ⵏ ⵙⵉⵔⵡⴰ (Tachelhit)

Geography
- Location: Souss-Massa-Drâa, Morocco
- Parent range: Little Atlas

(Standard Moroccan Tamazight: ⴰⴷⵔⴰⵔ ⵏ ⵙⵉⵔⵡⴰ, romanized: Adrar n Sirwa, Moroccan Arabic: جبل سيروا, romanized: Jbel Sirwa), is a peak in the Anti-Atlas mountain range. It is an old stratovolcano that rises 3,304 metres (10,840 ft) above sea level.
