= Anti-Atlas =

Mountain range in Morocco

Coordinates: 30°00′N 8°30′W

- الأطلس الصغير Aṭlas Mẓẓiyn
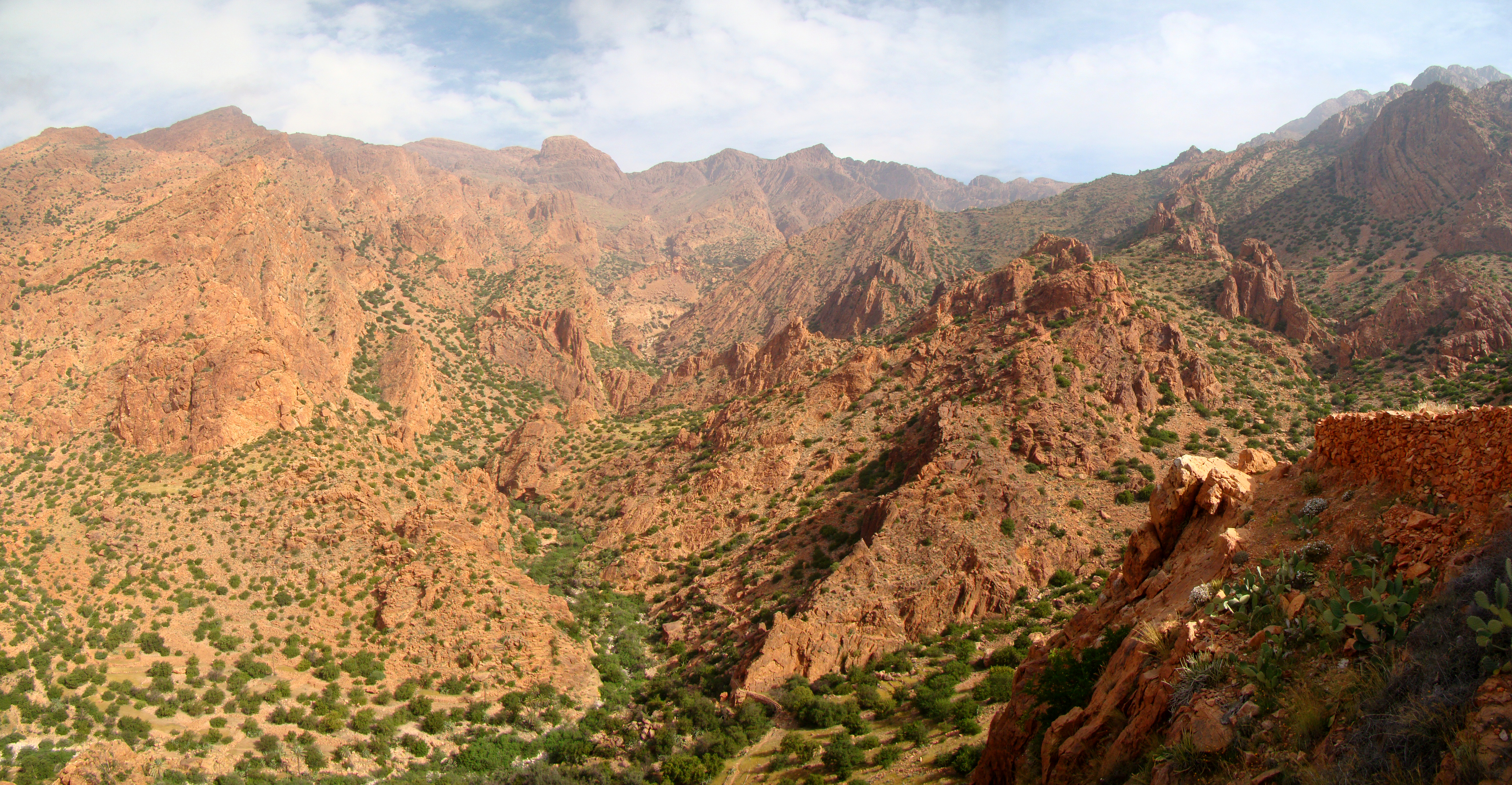
- A section of the Anti-Atlas near Tafraout. The peak in the background is Djebel el Kest.

Highest point
- Peak: Jbel Sirwa
- Elevation: 3,304 m (10,840 ft)

Dimensions
- Length: 800 km (500 mi) ENE/WSW
- Width: 180 km (110 mi) NNW/SSE

Geography
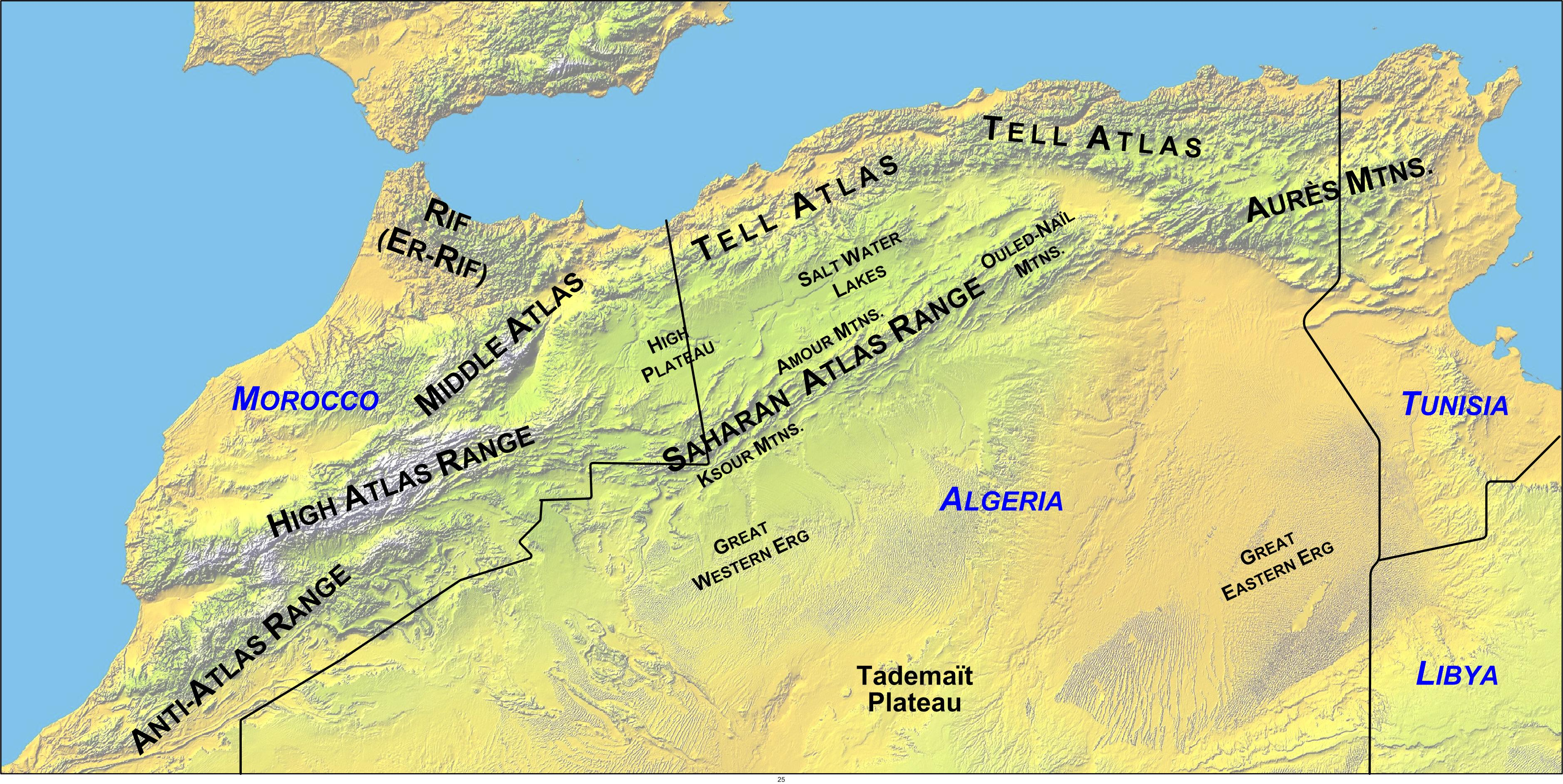
- Map of Northwest Africa with the Anti-Atlas in the lower left corner.
- Country: Morocco
- Parent range: Atlas Mountains

Geology
- Orogeny: Alleghenian
- Rock age: Paleozoic

Climbing
- Easiest route: drive

The Anti-Atlas, also known as Lesser Atlas or Little Atlas, is a mountain range in Morocco, a part of the Atlas Mountains in the northwest of Africa. The Anti-Atlas extends from the Atlantic Ocean in the southwest toward the northeast, to the heights of Ouarzazate and further east to the city of Tafilalt, altogether a distance of approximately 500 km. The range borders on the Sahara to the south.

== Geography ==
The summits of the Anti-Atlas reach average heights of 2,500–2,700 m (8,200–8,900 ft), with a few peaks reaching higher. To the north lies a plateau at 1700–1800 m in height. To the south lie the Sahara highlands at approximately 700 m. On the heights of Ouarzazate, the massif is cut through by the Draa valley, opening towards the south. The range is strongly fissured, particularly in a southerly direction.

The Anti-Atlas area is a traditionally Berber region, inhabited by the Chleuh group. It is sparsely inhabited and there are no large cities in the area. The main town is Tafraoute, which has been described as "Morocco's Berber heartland". There are cave paintings in certain areas of the range.

=== Subranges ===
The eastern prolongation of the Anti-Atlas is the Jbel Saghro range. The Jbel Sirwa is its northern prolongation, connecting with a section of the High Atlas range. The summit of Jbel Sirwa, of volcanic origin, reaches 3304 m. The Jebel Bani is a much lower range running along the southern side of the Anti Atlas.

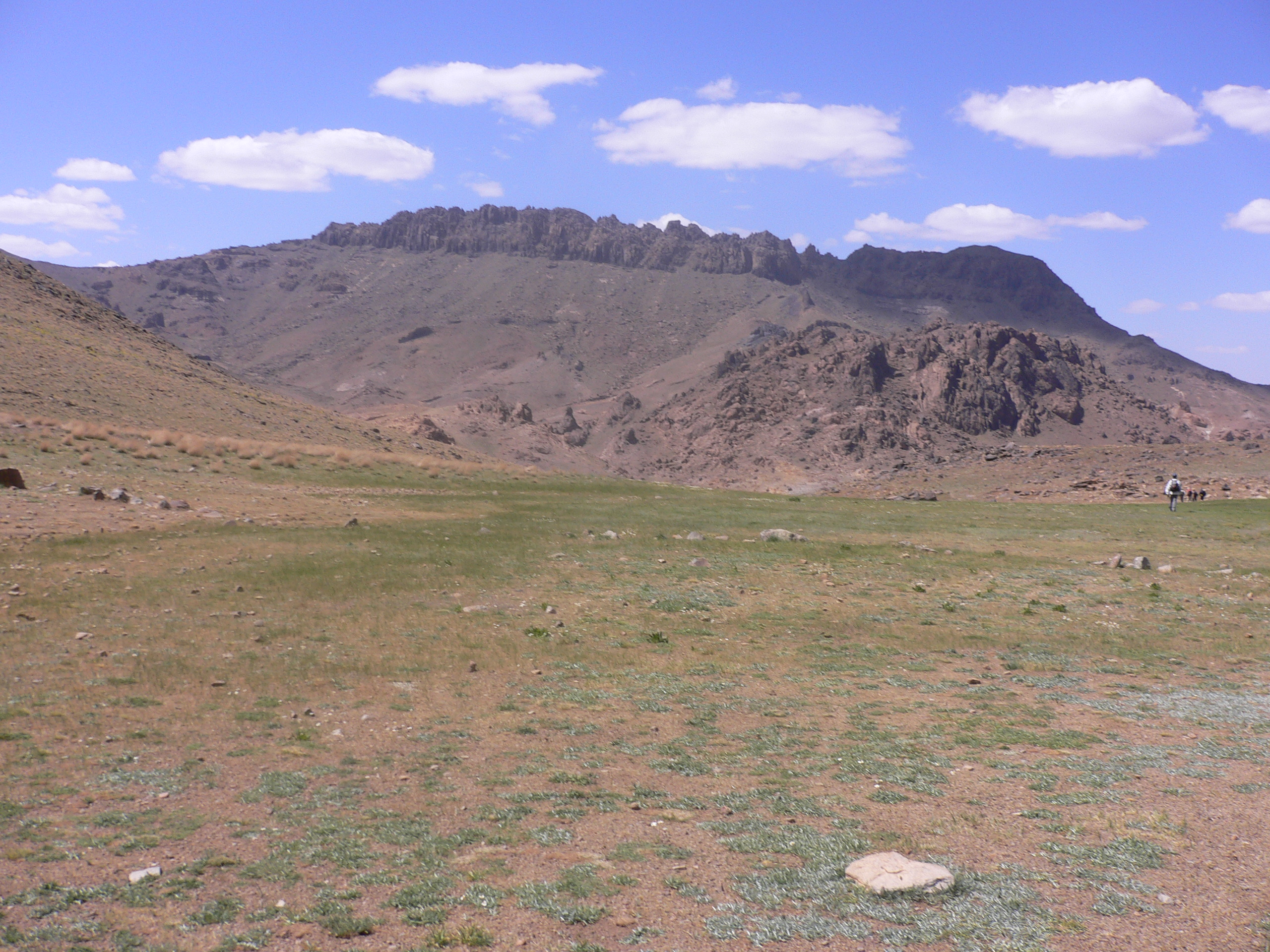
Jebel Sirwa, highest point in the Anti-Atlas range.

=== Origins ===
The basement rock of Africa (the African Plate) was formed in the Precambrian. A fraction of the Avalonia microcontinent, the Anti-Atlas range formed in the Paleozoic (c. 300 million years ago), as a result of continental collisions. North America, Europe and Africa were connected as part of two former continents, Euramerica and Gondwana, which ground against one another to create the former Central Pangean Mountains. Evidence shows that the Anti-Atlas Mountains were originally formed as part of the Alleghenian orogeny that also formed the Appalachians, formed when Gondwana (including Africa) and Euramerica (America) collided. There are indications they were once a chain of mountains far higher than the Himalayas are today.

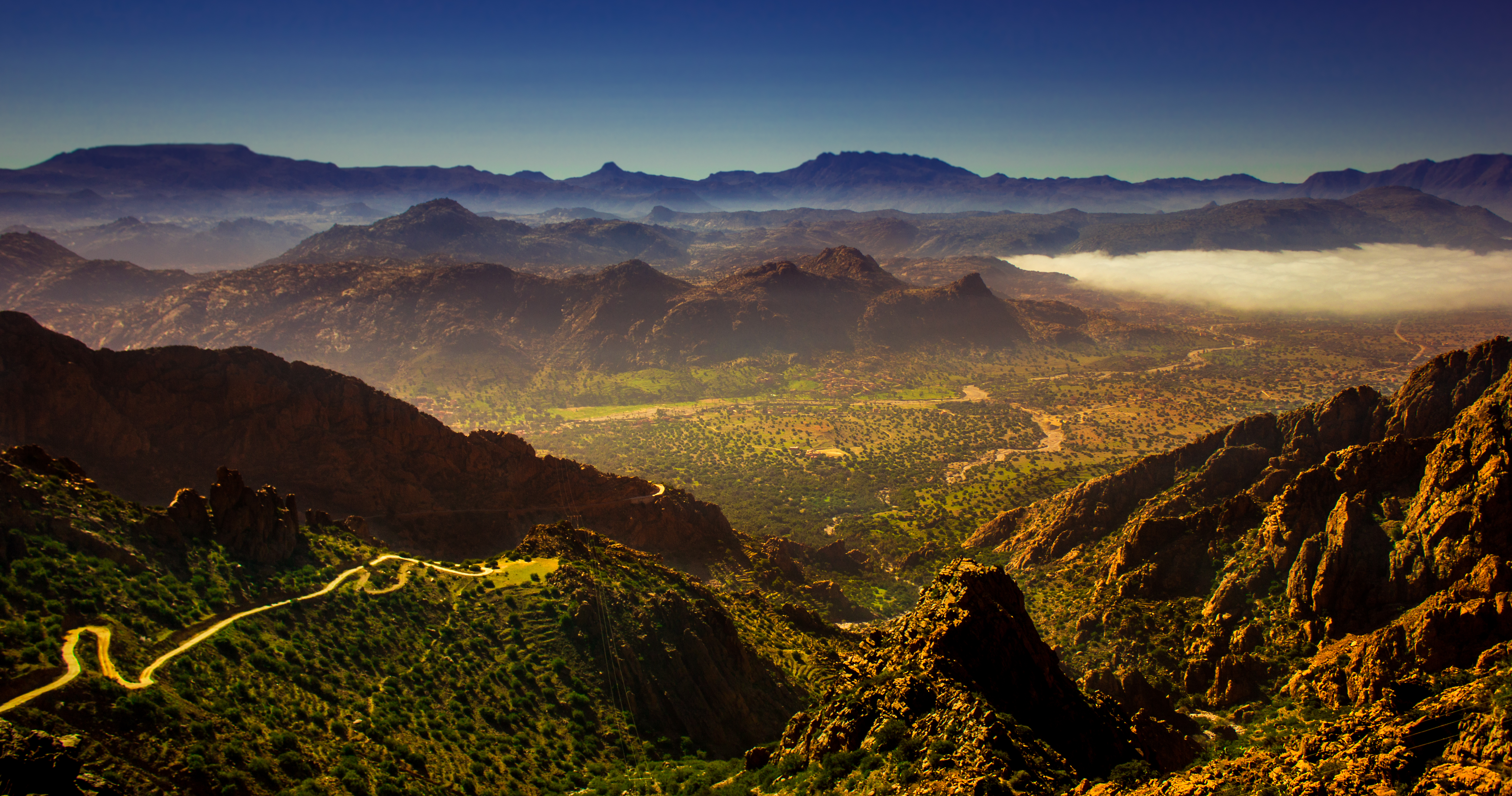
The Ameln valley

More recently, in the Paleogene and Neogene Periods (66 million to ~1.8 million years ago), the remaining mountain chains that today comprise the Atlas were uplifted as the land masses of Europe and Africa collided at the southern end of the Iberian Peninsula. Erosion continued to reduce the Anti-Atlas range so that it is today less massive than the High Atlas range to the north.

=== Climate ===
In the Anti-Atlas, the precipitation annually is typically below 200 mm, while the climatic conditions on the north and west slopes are locally more wet and agriculturally favorable. Climatically, the mountains are separated from the Mediterranean's influence by the High Atlas to its north, and therefore they belong to the Saharan climate zone. The driest area is the Jbel Saghro.

=== Flora ===
In the least dry areas to the west and the north, much of the land is covered with thyme, rosemary and other drought tolerant plants, such as argan. The quilt-like cover is endangered by overgrazing, and in the south little but thorn shrubs remain. The transition to the desert is gradual towards the south. The Moroccan citron is cultivated there, and used as the etrog in Jewish rituals.

== Human geography ==
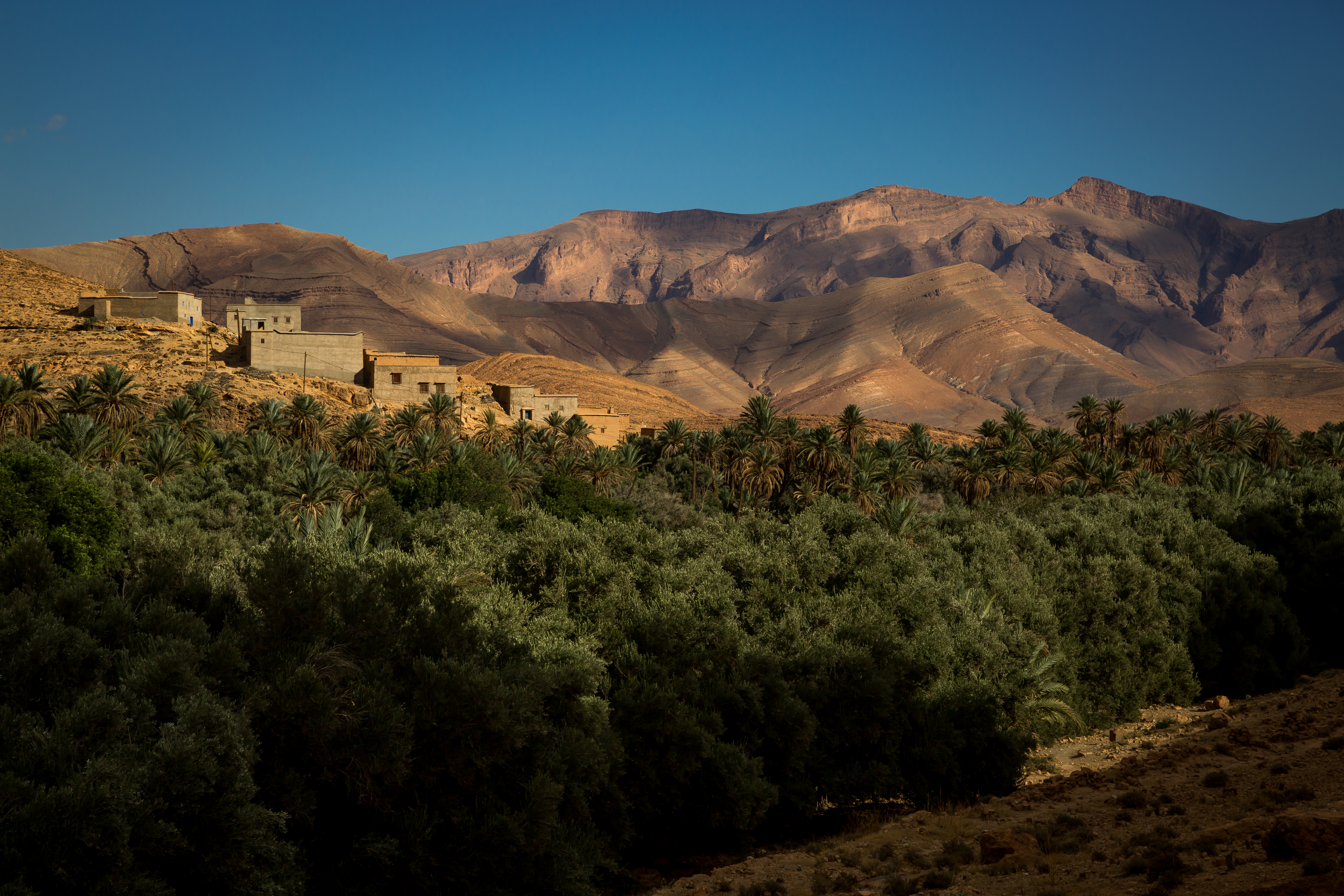
Village in the Anti-Atlas

The Anti-Atlas area is a traditionally Berber region, inhabited by the Chleuh group. It is sparsely inhabited and there are no large cities in the area. The main town is Tafraoute, which has been described as "Morocco's Berber heartland". Often the distances between one village and another are great, without any human presence in between. There are Neolithic cave paintings in certain areas of the range.

The landscape of the Anti-Atlas is marked by picturesque kasbah (small castles) in many places in the region. During former times, the kasbah was important as a place of shelter and as a supply depot for kinsmen. Close to these settlements, terraced fields with dry-stone retaining walls cover the landscape. However, increasingly houses are vacated and fields are left uncultivated. With the continued migration from the land, the irrigation systems necessary for agriculture are also decaying.

=== Panoramic view ===
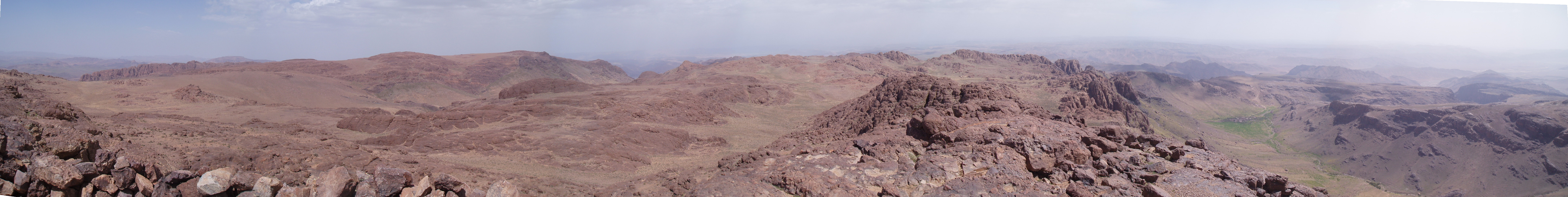
Panorama from Jbel Aklim
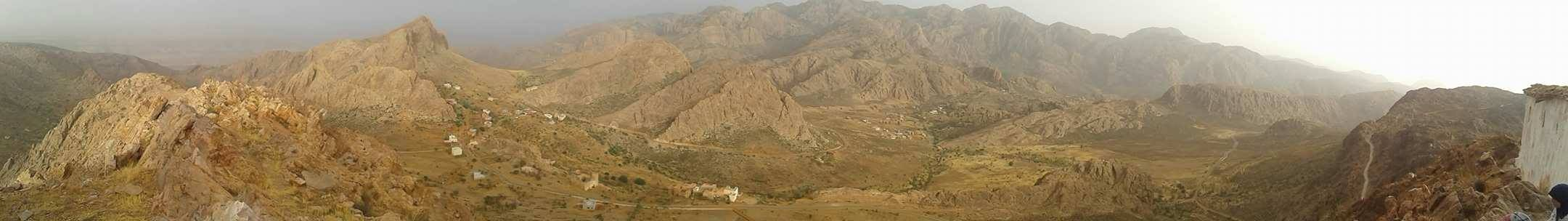
Panorama of Taltemsen

== See also ==
- Tata
