= Jbel Aklim =

Mountain in Morocco

Jbel Aklim Adrar n'Aklim / جبل أكليم
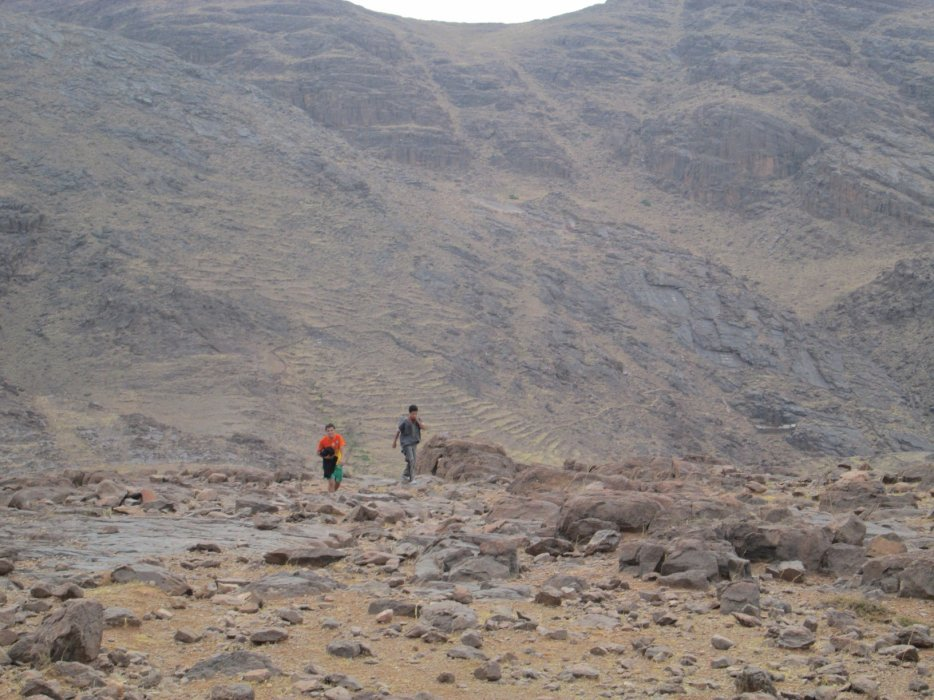

Highest point
- Elevation: 2,531 m (8,304 ft)
- Coordinates: 30°7′24.89″N 8°17′3.12″W

Geography
- Location within Morocco
- Location: Souss-Massa, Morocco
- Parent range: Anti-Atlas

Climbing
- First ascent: Unknown
- Easiest route: From Ameskar or Timguedert, Taroudant Province

Mount Aklim, Jbel Aklim (Berber languages: Adrar n'Aklim; Aklim n'Ouinisdrar), is a mountain of the Souss-Massa region of Morocco. Its altitude is 2,531 m.

It is located in the Anti-Atlas near the villages of Ameskar and Timguedert, Taroudant Province.

== Panorama ==
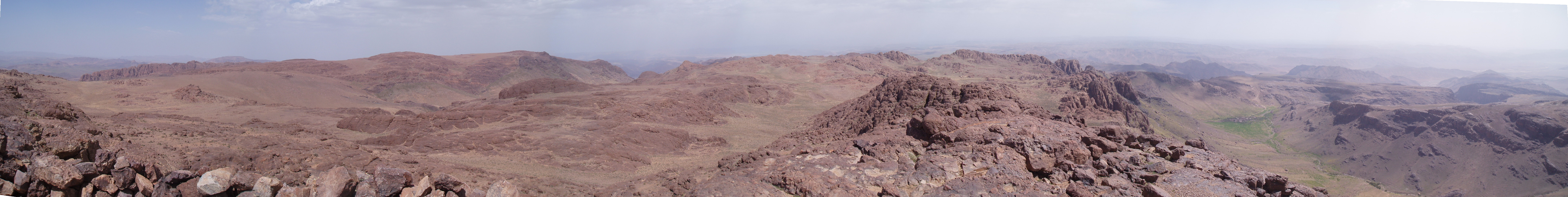
Panoramic view from Mount Aklim's summit

== See also ==
- Anti-Atlas
