= Mount Lkest =

Mountain in Morocco

Djebel Lkest
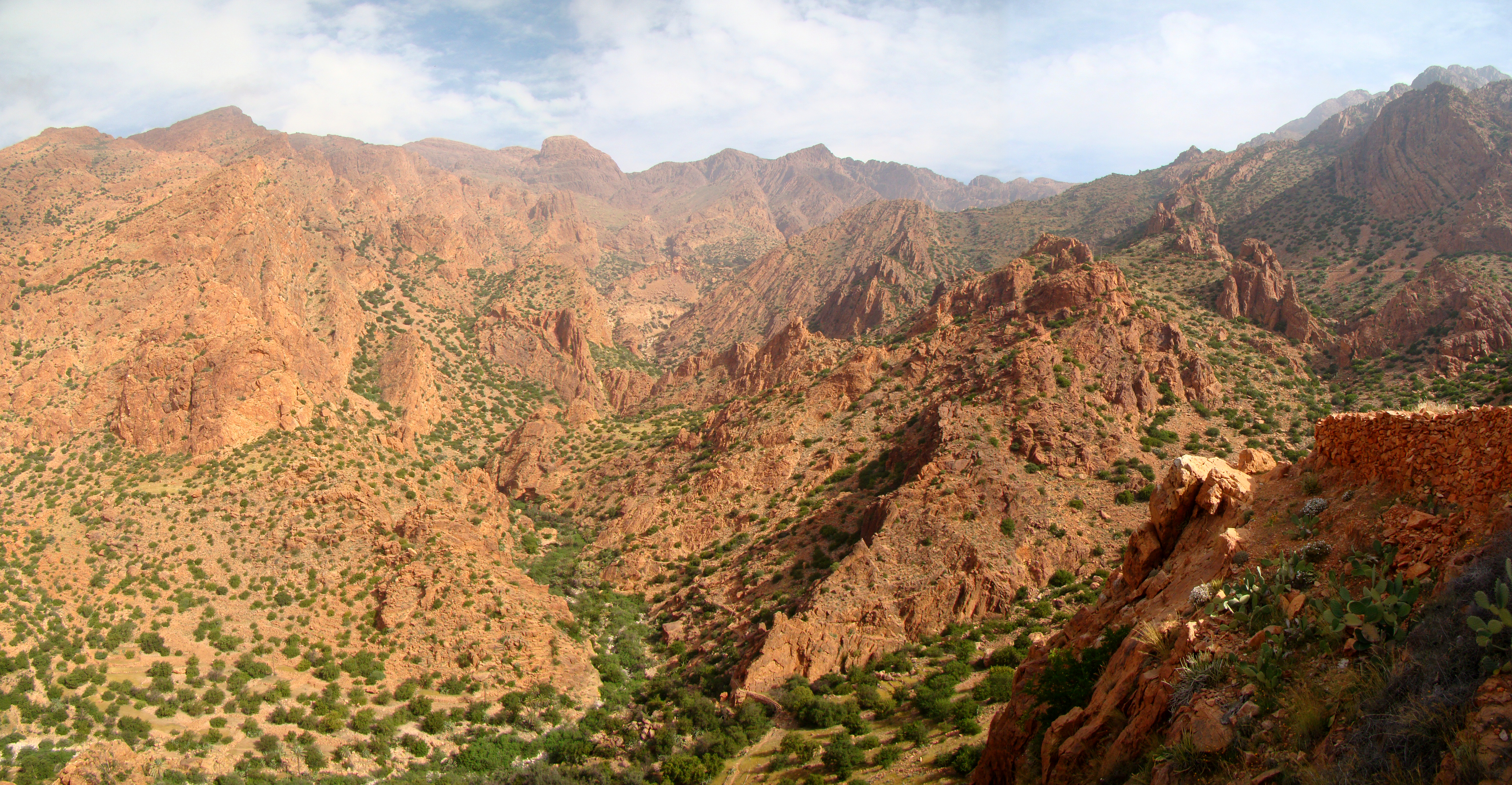
- The Lkest mountain as seen from Ammeln.

Highest point
- Elevation: 2,359 m (7,740 ft)
- Coordinates: 29°47′43″N 9°2′5″W

Geography
- Location within Morocco
- Location: Souss-Massa, Morocco
- Parent range: Anti Atlas Range

The Djebel Lkest (Tashelhit: ⴰⴷⵔⴰⵔ ⵏ ⵍⴽⵙⵜ Adrar n Lkst; Arabic: جبل لكست) is a mountain in the Anti-Atlas. Its summit Afa n Tmzgadiwin rises to 2,359 meters above sea level, making it one of the highest mountains of the Anti-Atlas in southern Morocco.
