= Taltemsen =

Coordinates: 29.8435°N 9.0409°W

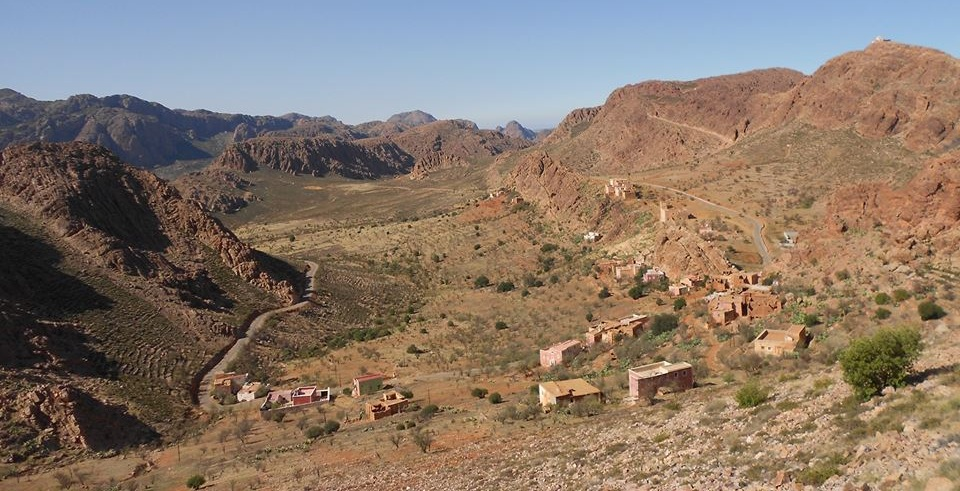
A view of the village

Taltemsen (Berber : ⵜⴰⵍⵜⵎⵙⵏ taltmsn) is a small Berber village located in the region of Souss-Massa in Morocco. According to the 2004 census, it has about 55 inhabitants.
