= Aicha Tachinouite =

Moroccan Shilha singer and dancer (born 1968)

Aicha Tachinouite ⵄⵉⵛⴰ ⵜⴰⵛⵉⵏⵡⵉⵜ
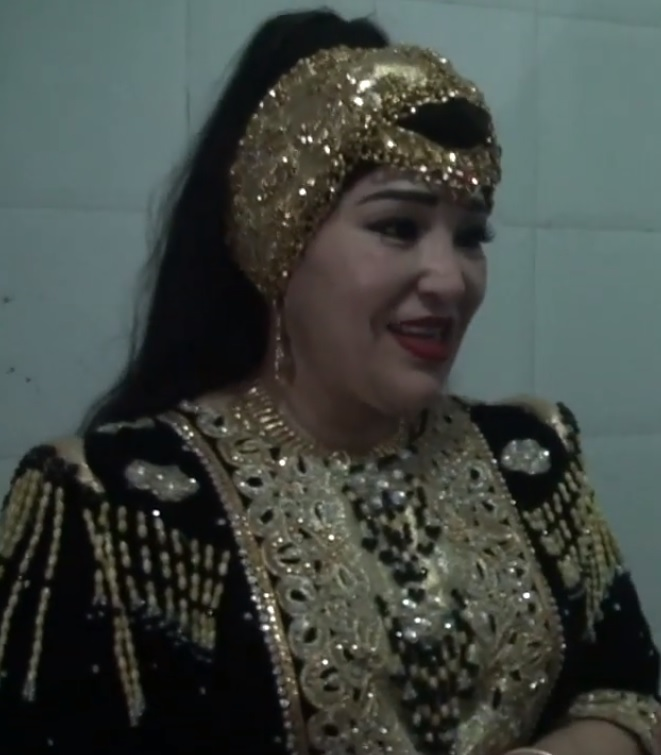

Background information
- Born: 1 January 1968 (age 58); Inezgane, Morocco
- Occupations: Singer, dancer

Aicha Tachinouite (berber: ⵄⵉⵛⴰ ⵜⴰⵛⵉⵏⵡⵉⵜ; born 1968) is a Moroccan Shilha singer and dancer. She sings and performs mainly in Tashelhit, her native Berber tongue.

== Biography ==
Aicha Ziati was born in 1968 in Inezgane, Morocco. She started dancing, singing, and composing music for school activities during her childhood. In the early 1990s, she started dancing and singing together with some of the biggest Amazigh was at that time such as Hassan Arsmouk and Outaleb El Mzoudi. Soon after, she became very popular in Morocco and started performing around the world.

== Concert tour ==
She participated in several national festivals in Morocco such as Mawazine and Timitar. She has also performed in international festivals such as in Japan and China.

== See also ==
- Tashelhit
- Naima Moujahid
- Fatima Tabaamrant
- Raissa Kelly
