= Inzerki =

Moroccan village and apiary

Inzerki: إنزركي (Arabic); ⵉⵏⵣⵔⴽⵉ (Tachelhit)
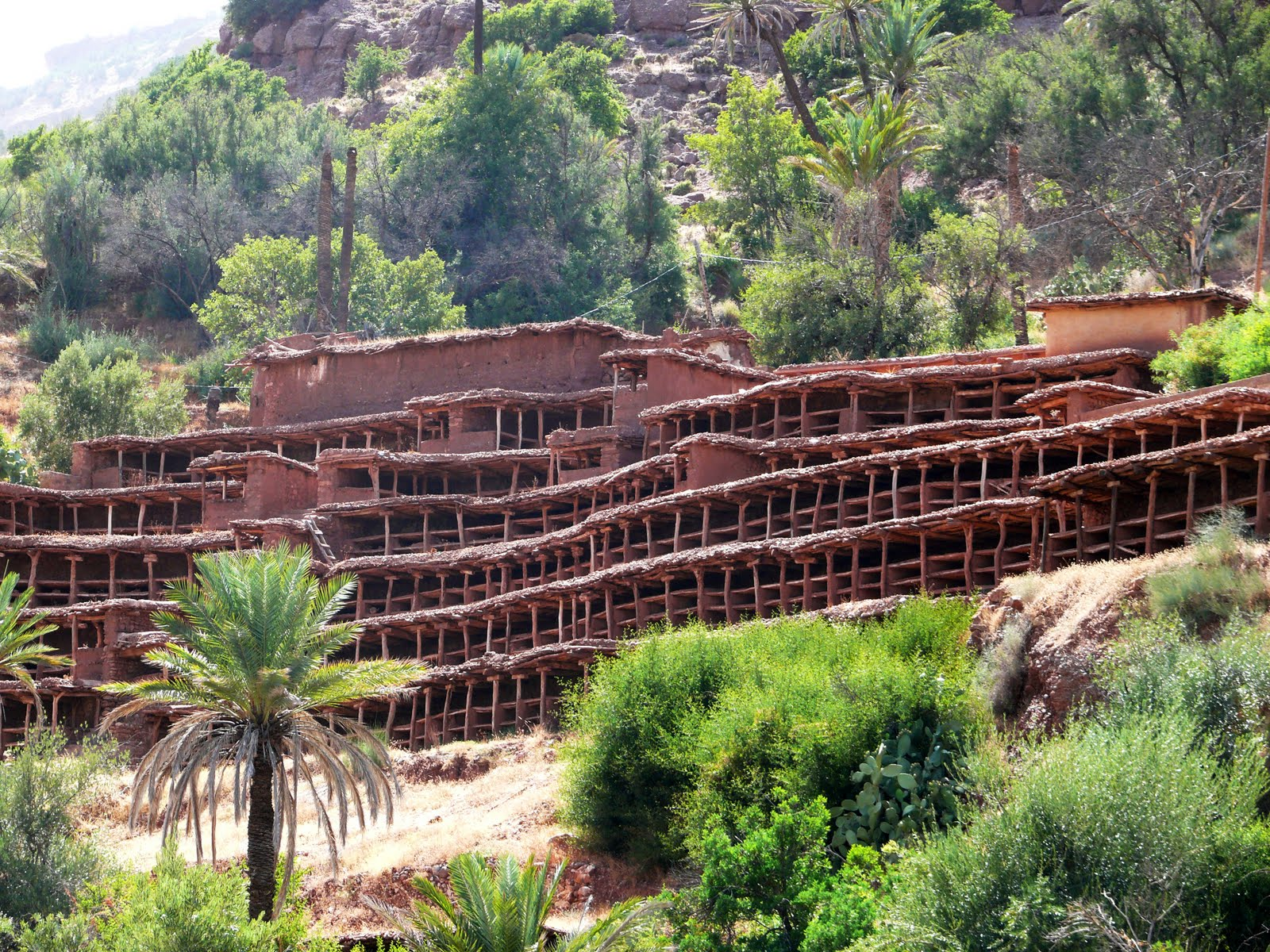

- Location within Morocco
- Coordinates (Inzerki): 30.7990°N 9.1913°W
- Country: Morocco
- Region: Souss-Massa
- Founded: 1520

Government
  - Mayor: Brahim Chtoui

Population
  - Estimate (2023): 250

Inzerki (Arabic: إنزركي; Tachelhit: ⵉⵏⵣⵔⴽⵉ) is a village in the rural commune of Argana, in the Sous valley of Morocco. The village is located 82 km north of Agadir.

The village is known for having the oldest and largest apiary in the world. Built in 1520, the apiary is composed of over 3,000 beehives.

== History ==
The apiary was built in 1520 using wood, rock, and adobe by a Shilha beekeeper seeking barakah (blessings) and counsel from a Sufi Sheikh, Sidi Mohamed ben El Hussain in the nearby village of Tafilaft. The Sheikh prayed for the beekeeper's success, and advised him on scouting a location to lay the first beehive.

Once he harvested honey from the hive, he visited the Sheikh's zawiya to gift the honey to the Sheikh. The Sheikh divided the honey amongst his students at the zawiya and made further prayers for Allah to give barakah (blessings) upon his beekeeping efforts.

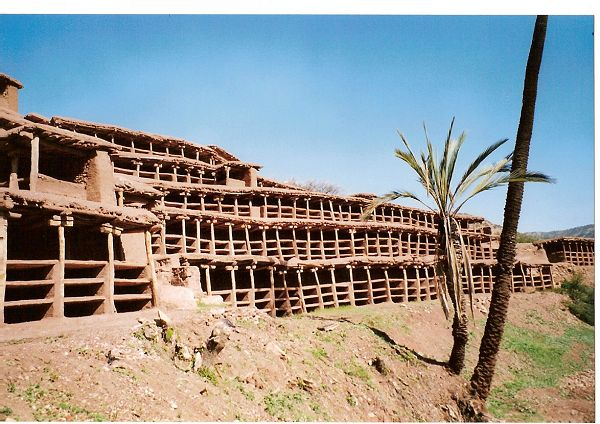
View of the apiary, 2010

After visiting the hive, the Sheikh suggested to the beekeeper that he build an adobe hut to house multiple hives. Upon hearing news of the Sheikh's visit, local villagers were eager to settle and construct their own huts to participate in the enterprise.

The apiary was renovated in 2005 in collaboration with USAID and UNESCO, after two floods in 1990 and 1995 that nearly destroyed the apiary. There currently are plans by the Taddart Inzerki Association to restore the apiary further. As of 2013, the Inzerki apiary contained 2,160 hives on three floors.

== Demographics ==
Inzerki is inhabited by around 250 Berber villagers, many of them predominantly Shilha. Eighty families work at the apiary. Each hive contains approximately 1,000 to 50,000 bees depending on the season and weather conditions.
