= Raissa Kelly =

French singer in Tashelhit

- Born: Karen Dounever or D'enfert; 1976 (age 49–50); Blois, France
- Genres: Tachelhit
- Occupations: Singer, musician

Karen or Raissa Kelly (born in Blois in 1976) is a French singer in Tachelhit.

== Biography ==
Kelly was born in 1976 from a French-Portuguese couple living in Blois in the department of Loir-et-Cher in France.

In 1988, Kelly visited Casablanca in Morocco together with her family. Aged 12 and during this trip, she was inspired to learn more about the Moroccan culture and languages.

In the end of 1991, she was invited to sing in Tashelhit in the national theater of Mohammed V in Rabat. After this appearance, she collaborated with several ways such as Hassan Arsmouk and mostly Hassan Aglawo under her artistic name Rayssa Kelly.

== Songs ==
Since her start during the early 1990s, Kelly has produced several recordings until her last album in 2002. Some of her songs are:

- Album 1996 with Hassan Aglawo – Warda Vision
  - Arbi Moulay Sidi a Moulana
  - Mani Mousoul N'ka
  - Ourid Oukane
  - Arsoulour Talat
  - Almousamiha
  - A Mounat
- Album 2002 – Warda Vision
  - Abou Tabla
  - Marhba ya Marhba
  - Ghika tga Tuderti
  - Timizar
  - Hourma ya sidi Lahfo
  - Youighkid Aluban Itfilit

== See also ==
- Tashelhit
- Naima Moujahid
- Fatima Tabaamrant
- Hassan Arsmouk
