= Mohammed Awzal =

Moroccan writer (1680–1749)

Muḥammad bin Ali al-Hawzali محمد بن علي الهوزالي
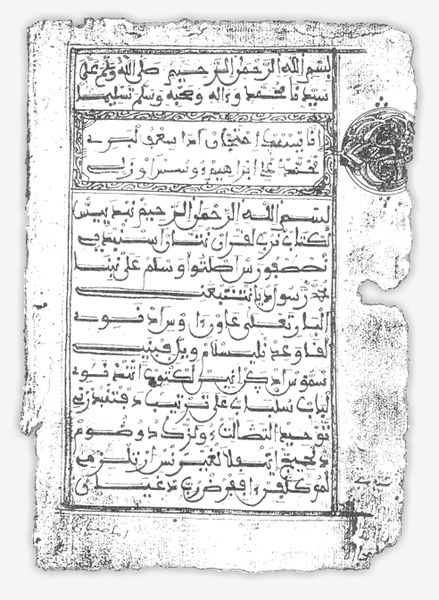
- The first page of an 18th-century manuscript of Muḥammad al-Hawzali's al-Ḥawḍ, part I (adapted from N. v.d. Boogert 1997 plate I)
- Born: 1670; Taroudant, Morocco
- Died: 1749 (aged 78–79); Taroudant, Morocco

Academic background
- Influences: Ibn al-Jawzi; Ahmed bin Nasser

Academic work
- Influenced: Muhammad al-Hudhayki

Muhammad bin Ali al-Hawzali (Arabic: محمد بن علي الهوزالي, Berber languages: Mḥmmd U Ɛli Awzal; 1680–1749) is the most important author in the literary tradition of the Tachelhit language. He was born around 1680 in the village of al-Qaṣaba (Lqṣba) in tribal territory of the Induzal, in the region of Sous in Morocco and died in 1749.

His full name in Arabic is Muḥammad ibn ʿAlī ibn Ibrāhīm al-Akbīlī al-Hawzālī (or al-Indūzālī) al-Sūsī. He is the author of several works in Shilha and Arabic which are preserved in manuscripts.

== Life and works ==
There are few hard facts about al-Hawzali's life. He may have killed somebody from his tribe when he was young and this may have been the reason for him to seek refuge in Tamegroute, a village known for an ancient sanctuary, where he started his religious studies. It was probably towards the end of his studies that he wrote in Arabic, as an essay, his first work, Mahamiz al-Ghaflan. After some time he came back to his place of origin, putting himself at the disposal of the family of the murder victim. They could have taken revenge on him but instead, convinced of the sincerity of his conversion and of his new choice of life, they forgave him.

Life, however, was not always easy in his village as his preachings were not popular. It seems that in reaction to such resistance he composed his second work, in Arabic, the Tanbih ("Admonition").

When he returned to Tamegroute his master, Sheikh Ahmad, recognising his talent as a poet, supported the writing of his first work in Shilha, entitled Al-Ḥawḍ "The Reservoir". This work, divided in two parts (ʿibādāt and muʿāmalāt) like other works on Islamic law, is a complete legal manual according to the Maliki school. Its main sources are two classical texts, the ʿAqīdat ahl al-tawḥīd by Muḥammad ibn Yūsuf al-Sanūsī (for the first chapter of part 1 which deals with theology), and the Mukhtaṣar by Khalīl ibn Isḥāq al-Jundī (for all other chapters of both part).

His following work, Baḥr al-Dumūʿ "The Ocean of Tears", an exhortation in verse and treatise on eschatology. This is probably the best known text by al-Hawzali and a masterpiece of Berber literature. It can be found as a manuscript in the most important libraries and private collections. The text has been translated into French by B.H. Stricker and Arsène Roux and into English by N. van den Boogert.

Probably at the time of writing "The Ocean of Tears", 1714), the poet had already returned for a last time to his village of birth, where he worked as a teacher and a mufti until his death. He left a daughter and a son, Bṛahim.

The dating of his last and shorter work in Berber is uncertain, al-Naṣīḥah "The Advice", is an ode in praise of Sidi (Saint) Aḥmad ibn Muḥammad ibn Nāṣir, al-Hawzali's spiritual guide and grand master of the Nāṣirīyah Sufi order (founded by his grandfather), probably inspired as a funeral eulogy by his death, around 1708.

Almost a third of all known Shilha manuscripts contain parts of his works, and the largest Berber text in existence is a commentary by al-Hasan al-Tamuddizti (d. 1898) on al-Hawzali's al-Hawd.

al-Hawzali, in his honor, is also the name of rhymed couplets and long poems that Ishilhin women chant daily or weekly, between the afternoon and sunset Islamic obligatory prayer times, in the tomb complexes of local holy figures.

== See also ==
- Hemmou Talb
