= Oudaden =

Oudaden ⵓⴷⴰⴷⴻⵏ
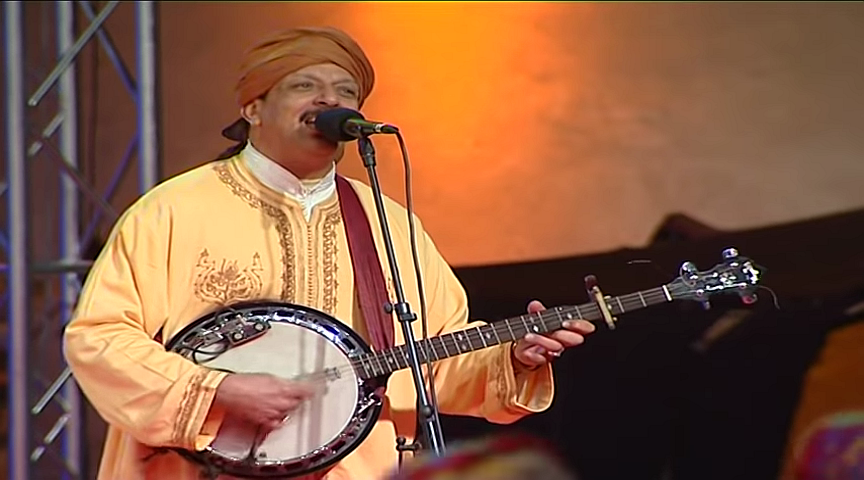
- Abdellah El Foua, leader of Oudaden

Background information
- Origin: Agadir, Morocco
- Genres: Soussi Amazigh
- Years active: 1978–present
- Label: Buda Musique
- Members: Abdellah el Foua; Ahmed el Foua; Mohammed Jemoumekh; Larbi Amhal; Khalid el Foua; Larbi Boukharmous

Oudaden (in Berber: ⵓⴷⴰⴷⴻⵏ) is a Moroccan musical group that plays Berber amazigh music. The band was formed in 1978 in Ben Sergao, near Agadir, in the Sous region of Morocco. Its lead vocalist and banjoist is Abdellah el Foua.

== History ==
Oudaden was founded in 1978 in Ben Sergao, near Agadir. The group has performed throughout Morocco and internationally, particularly in Europe and the United States. They performed in Malaysia at the Rainforest World Music Festival, and in Tanzania on the occasion of the Sauti za Busara. Their first album was released in 1985. The band's discography has grown to thirty-eight albums, contributing to the revival of Amazigh song.

In 2012, they went on tour in France and performed at the Arab World Institute.

== Group members ==
Current members

- Abdellah el Foua (banjo and vocals)
- Ahmed el Foua (talunt, a type of drum, and tagoualt)
- Mohammed Amarrir (tam-tam, called tigwaline)
- Larbi Amhal (tismamayeen-nakus)
- Khalid el Foua (talunt)
- said ouhdi (guitar)

Former members

== Style ==
Oudaden takes inspiration from traditional Amazigh music. It is one of the leaders of the Soussi style called "Tagroupit" or "Tiroubba". Their unique style is a sub-genre of the Tazenzart style and is often present in wedding ceremonies in the Maghreb, and almost always includes at least one banjo and electric guitar.

== Discography ==
=== Albums ===
- 2011 : Empreinte (Buda Musique)
- 2012 : Mayna
