= Shilha people =

Berber ethnic group

ⵉⵛⵍⵃⵉⵢⵏ
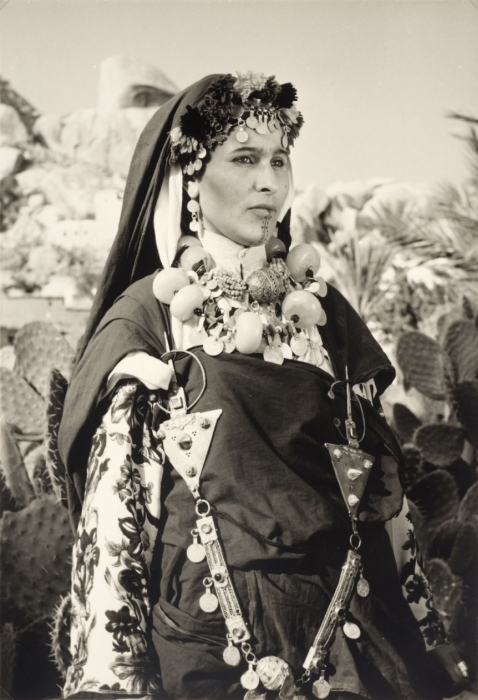

Regions with significant populations
- Atlas Mountains, Sous Valley, Morocco
- Morocco: c. 5,000,000–7,500,000
- France: c. 500,000

Languages
- Shilha

Religion
- Sunni Islam, small Jewish minority

Related ethnic groups
- Riffians, Kabyles and other Berbers

The Shilha people (Tachelhit: ⵉⵛⵍⵃⵉⵢⵏ, romanized: išelḥiyen), rendered as Chleuh in French, are a Berber ethnic group that inhabit and are indigenous to the Anti-Atlas, High Atlas and the Sous valley. The Shilha people are a part of Morocco's Berber-speaking communities, and the southernmost residing Berber population.

== Name and etymology ==
The Shilha people traditionally call themselves išelḥiyen. This endonym is rendered as Chleuh in French. The Ishelhien are also known as Shluh and Schlöh. Among Arabic speakers, Chleuh is used as a general term for Berbers, although Imazighen is the proper Berber self-designation for Berbers as a whole.

The origin of the name is debated. The earliest known appearance in a Western source is in Mármol's Descripcion general de Affrica (1573, part I, book I, chapter XXXIII):

...y entre los Numidas, y Getulos dela parte occidental de Affrica se habla Berberisco cerrado, y alli llaman esta lengua, Xilha, y Tamazegt, q̃ son nõbres muy antiguos.

"...and among the Numidians and Getulians of the western part of Afri-ca, they speak Berber with marked local features, and there they call this language Xilha [ʃilħa] and Tamazegt [tamaziɣt], which are very old names."

The Moroccan Royal Institute of Amazigh Culture (IRCAM) has suggested an Arabic origin, tracing the root šlḥ to the Arabic noun šilḥ "bandit" (plural šulūḥ). However, this meaning does not exist in Maghrebi Arabic dialects, and critics have noted that proponents of this hypothesis were not Shilha speakers.

Other explanations are based on the Shilha language itself. One proposal, by Mohammed Akdim, derives the name from the Shilha verb ishlh, meaning "to settle down, reside and live", suggesting the name Shluh means "settled residents".

== History ==
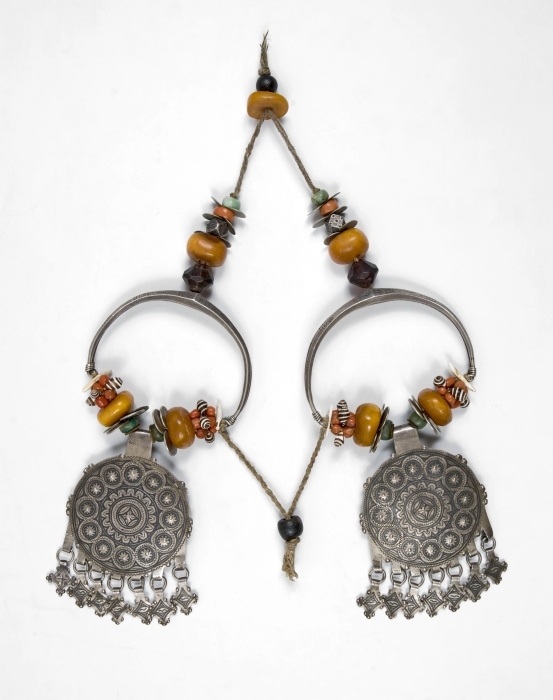
A traditional Shilha dowry item

In antiquity, Berbers traded with the Phoenicians and Carthaginians in commercial entrepots and colonies along the northwestern littoral. They established the ancient kingdom of Mauretania, which fell under Roman rule in 33 CE, before eventually being reunited under Berber sovereignty. During the 7th century, the Islamic Umayyad Caliphate invaded the Berber and Byzantine strongholds in the Northwest Africa, seizing Carthage in 698 AD. Although the Umayyads nominally controlled Morocco over the following years, their rule was tenuous due to Berber resistance. Shortly in 739 AD, Umayyad Arabs were defeated by the Berbers at the battle of Nobles and Bagdoura. Morocco remained under the rule of Berber kingdoms such as Barghawata and Midrar... etc. In 789 AD, with the approval of the locals, a former Umayyad courtier established the Idrisid dynasty that ruled in Fez. It lasted until 970 AD, as various petty states vied for control over the ensuing centuries.

After 1053, Morocco was ruled by a succession of Muslim dynasties founded by Berber tribes. Among these were the Almoravid dynasty (1053–1147) who spread Islam in Morocco, the Almohad dynasty (1147–1275), and the Marinid dynasty (1213–1524). In 1668, a sharifan family from the east assumed control and established the incumbent Alawite dynasty.

The French and Spanish colonial empires partitioned Morocco in 1904, and the southern part of the territory was declared a French protectorate in 1912. Arabization remained an official state policy under both the colonial and succeeding post-independence governments. With the spread of the Berber Spring in Algeria to Berber territory during the 1980s, the Berbers sought to reaffirm their Berber roots.

== Culture ==
=== Society ===
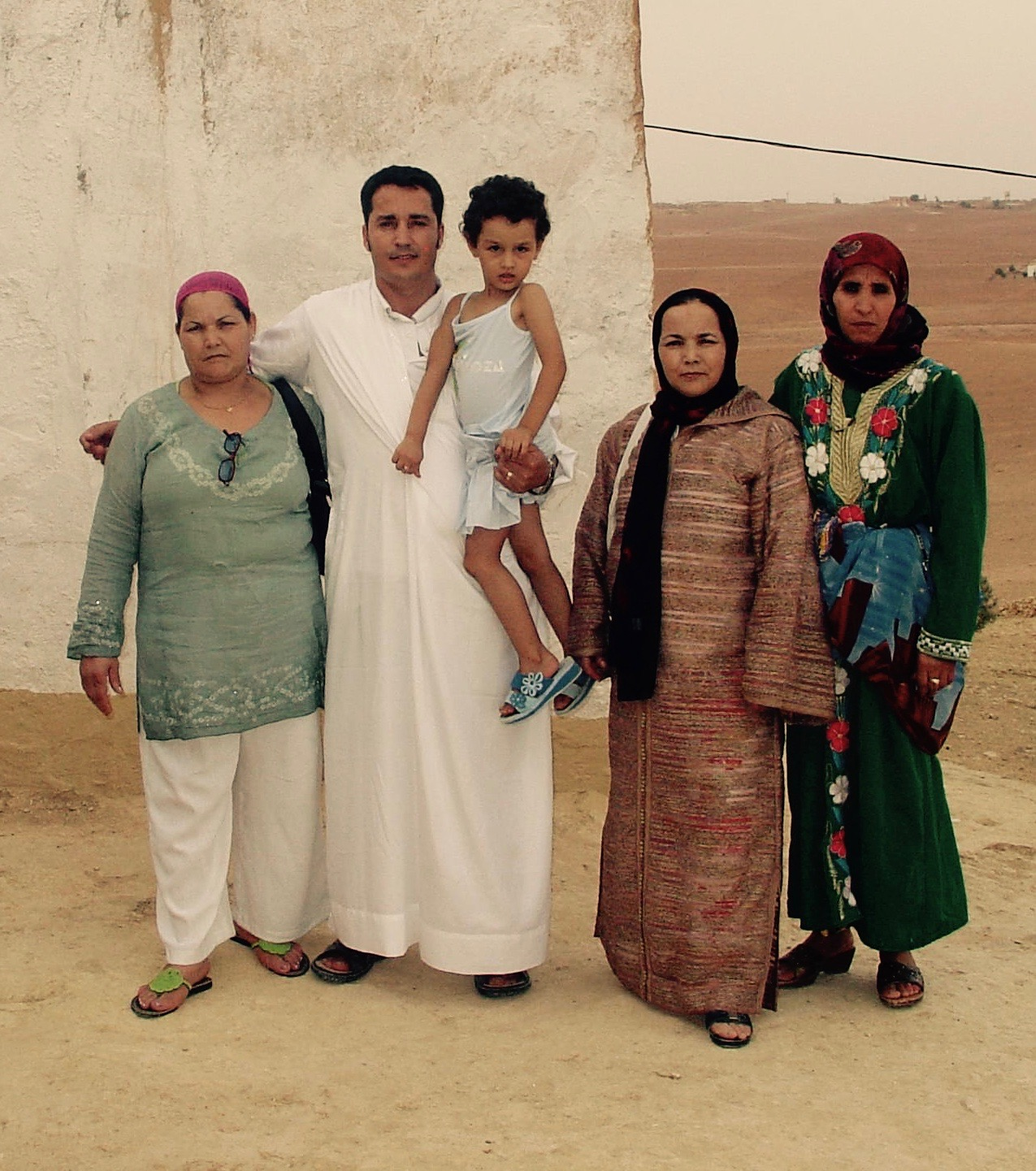
A Shilha family

The Ishelhien mainly live in Morocco's Atlas Mountains and Sous Valley. Traditionally, they are farmers who also keep herds. Some are semi-nomadic, growing crops during the season when water is available, and moving with their herds during the dry season.

The Ishelhien communities in the southwestern mountains of Morocco cooperated with each other in terms of providing reciprocal grazing rights as seasons changed, as well as during periods of war. These alliances were re-affirmed by annual festive gatherings, where one Shilha community would invite nearby and distant Shilha communities.

=== Traditional clothing ===
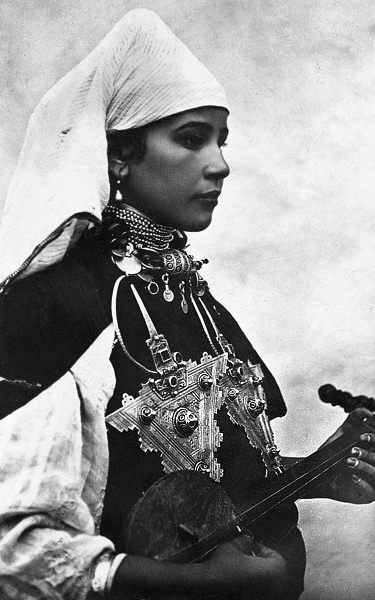
Shilha woman in her traditional outfit

Shilha tribes in Morocco, especially in the Souss region, are distinguished by their women and girls wearing a specific dress for each tribe and village, in a way that makes people in the region recognize the woman's tribe by her dress, whether it is everyday wear or occasional wear.

Shilha women wear an Asmal or Achayt Caftan, a long red shirt embroidered with unique patterns based on wool threads colored in red, yellow and green, they then places the ssayah, a long skirt in white or black, embroidered with patterns. It is worn over the Asmal caftan, paired with colorful shoes known as Iddukan.

On their head, women wear the Qatib, a popular red silk scarf with which the woman covers her hair, its also worn with or in different colors. It is also sometimes replaced by the Addal, a long white robe that reaches to the feet, similar to the Haik, with which the Shilha woman covers her body and head.

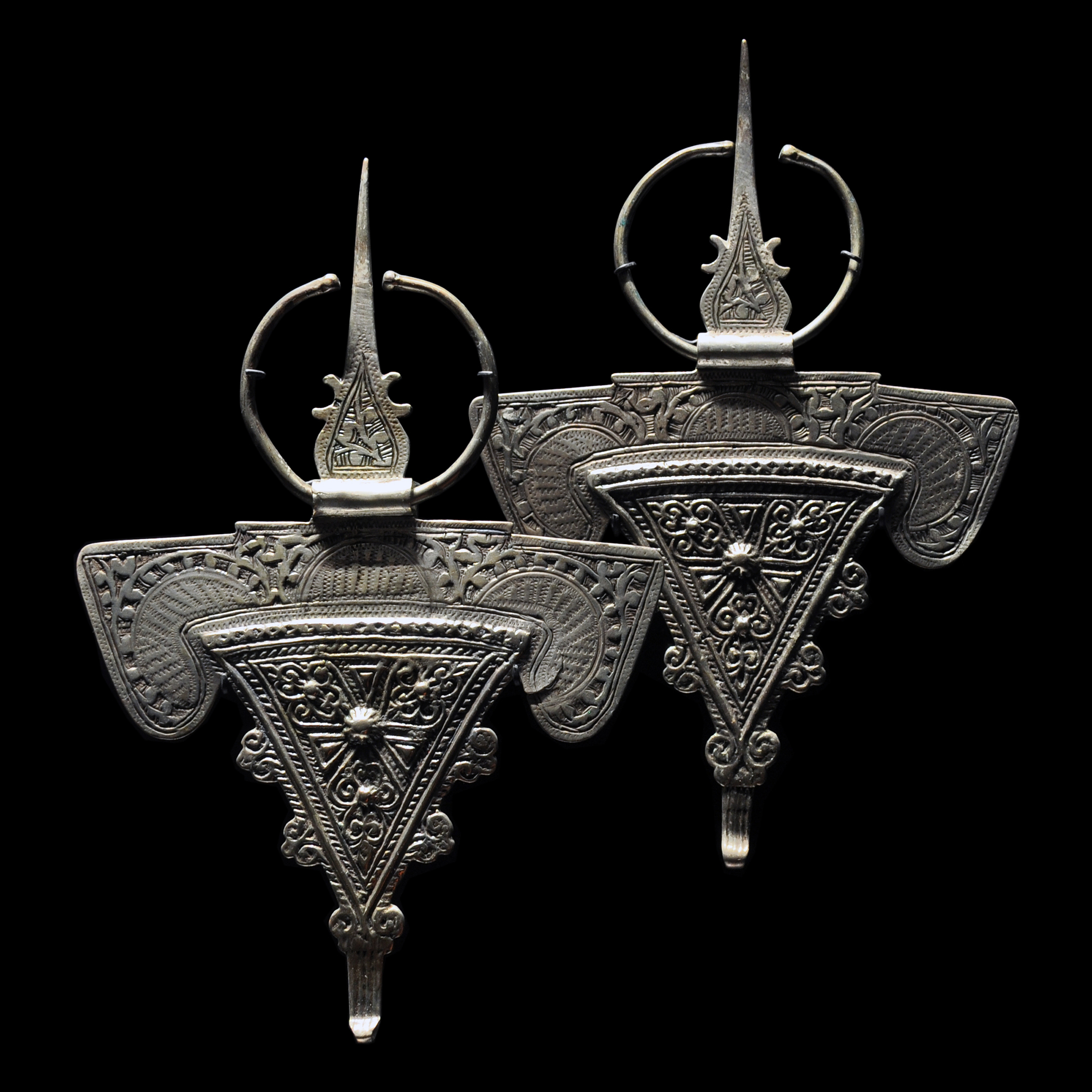
Two fibulae crafted from silver on display at the Musée du quai Branly in Paris.

The most important feature of the traditional costume of the women is their silver adornment, called, which differs from one tribe to another. In every traditional outfit, you can expect a Tawnza, a crown made of silver and coral, this often distinguishes between tribes. Women also wear Taẓeṛẓit, they're silver Amazigh fibula adorning the chest and abdomen, along with Tanbalt, which are a pair of silver hinged bracelets.

== Language ==
The Ishelhien speak Tashelhit, a Berber language. It belongs to the Berber branch of the Afro-Asiatic family. Their language is sometimes referred to as Sous-Berber. Tashelhit differs considerably from some other Berber languages, such as those spoken by the Tuareg. The name, Taclḥit, (in Tifinagh script: ⵜⴰⵛⵍⵃⵉⵜ) is morphologically a feminine noun, derived from masculine Aclḥiy "male speaker of Shilha". In most of its usages, Aclḥiy simply means "a speaker of Shilha". It is not known whether children of Shilha speakers in the migrant communities who have not acquired an active knowledge of the language still identify themselves as Aclḥiy. There is also an ethnic (racial) dimension to the term: white native speakers of Shilha generally refer to black native speakers (the modern descendants of liberated slaves) with the term asuqqiy, a pejorative term derived from Arabic suq "market" (where slaves were bought and sold). The literature offers no information on the self-designation of black speakers.

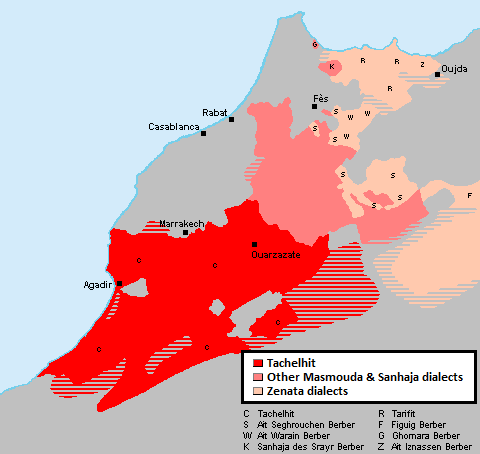
Tashelhit-speaking areas

Shilha is spoken in an area covering around 100,000 square kilometres. The area comprises the western part of the High Atlas mountains and the regions to the south up to the Draa River, including the Anti-Atlas and the alluvial basin of the Sous River.

As of 2024, there were around 5.2 million Shilha speakers, constituting 14.2% of the Moroccan population.

== People of Shilha descent ==
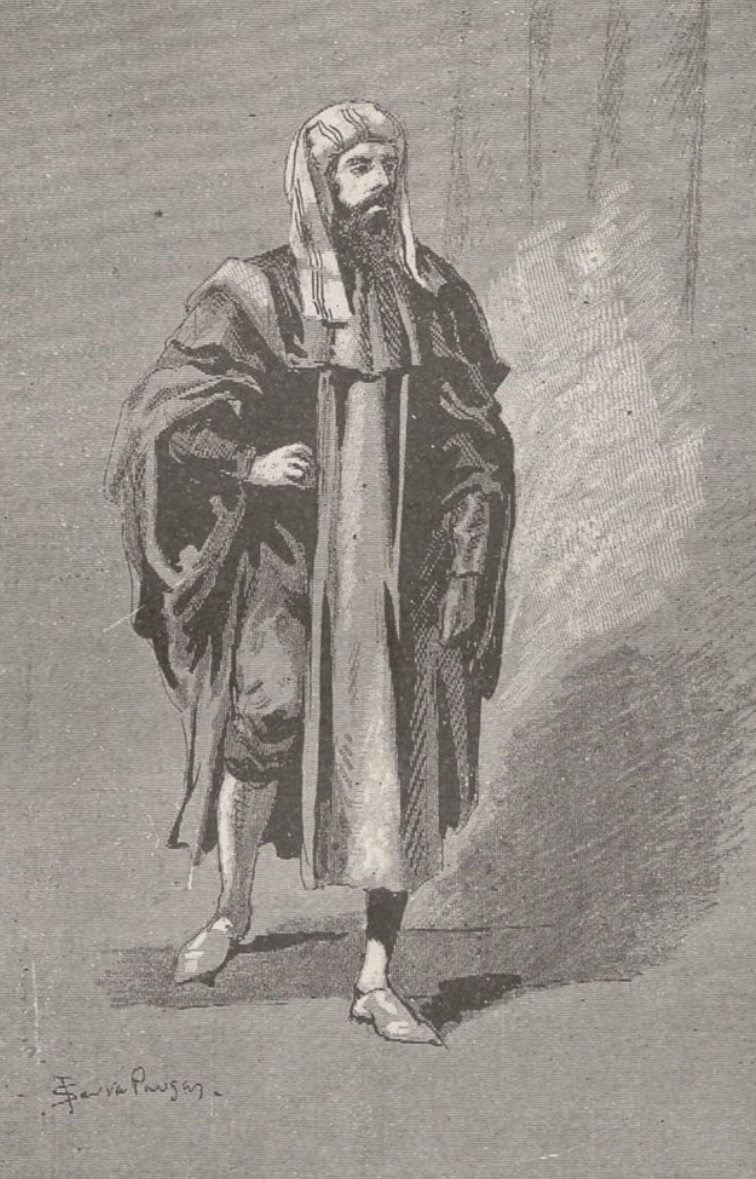
Spanish engraving depicting Ibn Tumart.

- Abdallah ibn Yasin (? –1059 C.E), Islamic theologian, spiritual leader and the founder of the Almoravid movement.
- Ibn Tumart (ca. 1080–1130), was a Muslim religious scholar, teacher and political leader, from the Sous in southern present-day Morocco. He found and served as the spiritual and first military leader of the Almohad movement.
- Yusuf ibn Tashfin (? –1106), noble Sanhaja leader of the Almoravid Empire. He cofounded the city of Marrakesh and led the Muslim forces in the Battle of Sagrajas, which lead to Almoravid rule over Al Andalus.
- Abu Muhammad Abd al-Wahid ibn Abi Hafs (? –1221), Almohad governor of Ifriqiya from 1207 to 1221 and the father of the first Hafsid sultan Abu Zakariya Yahya.
- Abu Zakariya Yahya (1203–1249), founder and first sultan of the Hafsid dynasty in Ifriqiya
- Sidi Ahmed Ou Moussa (1460–1563) Muslim saint and spiritual leader of Tazerwalt.
- Sidi Ali Bou Dmia (1592–1659), King and founder of the emirate of Tazerwalt, famous for his victory against the moroccan sultan Sharif Ibn Ali.
- Mohammed Awzal (1680–1749), the most prolific and the most important author in the literary tradition of the Tachelhit language, producing hundreds of works in his lifetime.
- Mririda n Ayt Atiq (c. 1900 – c. 1940s), Tashelhit poet whose poetry dealt with topics tabu at the time (particularly coming from a woman poet), such as divorce, love between women, household problems, and unrequited love, and who openly voiced her inner thoughts as a means of rebellion and resistance against a culture of patriarchy.
- Mohammed al-Mokhtar Soussi (1900–1963), scholar, politician and writer who, from 1956 to 1963, was the Minister of Religious Affairs and member of the Crown Council in the government of Mohammed V.
- Saadeddine Othmani (born 1956), Moroccan politician and psychiatrist who served as the Prime Minister of Morocco from 2017 to 2021.
- Aziz Akhannouch (born 1961), politician, businessman and billionaire. He is the current Prime Minister of Morocco.
- Saïd Taghmaoui (born 1973), prominent French-Moroccan actor. One of his major screen roles was that of Saïd in the 1995 French film La Haine. Taghmaoui has also appeared in a number of Hollywood films.
- Loreen (born 1983), prominent singer and songwriter. Representing Sweden, she won the Eurovision Song Contest twice, in 2012 and 2023 with the songs "Euphoria" and "Tattoo" respectively. She is the second performer in Eurovision history to have won the contest twice, and the first woman to do so.
- Oudaden, popular musical group that plays traditional Shilha music. The band was formed in 1978 in Ben Sergao, near Agadir, in the Sous region.
- Ammouri Mbarek (1954–2015), Shilha musician widely known for changing the traditional music scene in Morocco.
- Youssouf Hadji (born 1980), former professional footballer who played as an attacking midfielder. He served as the team captain for AS Nancy and also used to represent the Moroccan national team.
- Mustapha Hadji (born 1971), football coach and former player. He was named the 50th greatest African player of all time by the African football expert Ed Dove.
- Chemsdine Talbi (born 2005), professional footballer who plays as a winger for Premier League club Sunderland. Internationally, Talbi also proudly represented the Moroccan national team.
- Yunis Abdelhamid (born 1987), professional footballer who plays for the Moroccan national team.
- Youssef Aït Bennasser (born 1996), professional footballer who plays for Samsunspor. He also represents Morocco at international level.
- Mbark Boussoufa (born 1984), retired professional footballer.
- Mohammed Khaïr-Eddine (1941–1995), Moroccan poet and writer. He was among the most famous Moroccan Amazigh literary figures, leaving a permanent mark in Indigenous Moroccan literature.
- Mohamed Bensaid Ait Idder (1925–2024), Moroccan politician and activist. Ait Idder started his activism first against the French Protectorate of Morocco, and was one of the founders and leaders of the Moroccan Army of Liberation. After Morocco's independence, Ait Idder directly opposed the regime in place, particularly King Hassan II.
- Issam Chebake (born 1989), professional footballer.
- Walid Azaro (born 1995), professional footballer.
- Saadia Himi (born 1984), model and beauty queen.
- Hassan Arsmouk (born 1963), popular singer.
- Hindi Zahra (born 1979), popular singer.

== See also ==
- Riffians
- Sahrawis
- Tuareg people
