= Hassan Arsmouk =

Musical artist

Hassan Arsmouk حسن أرسموك
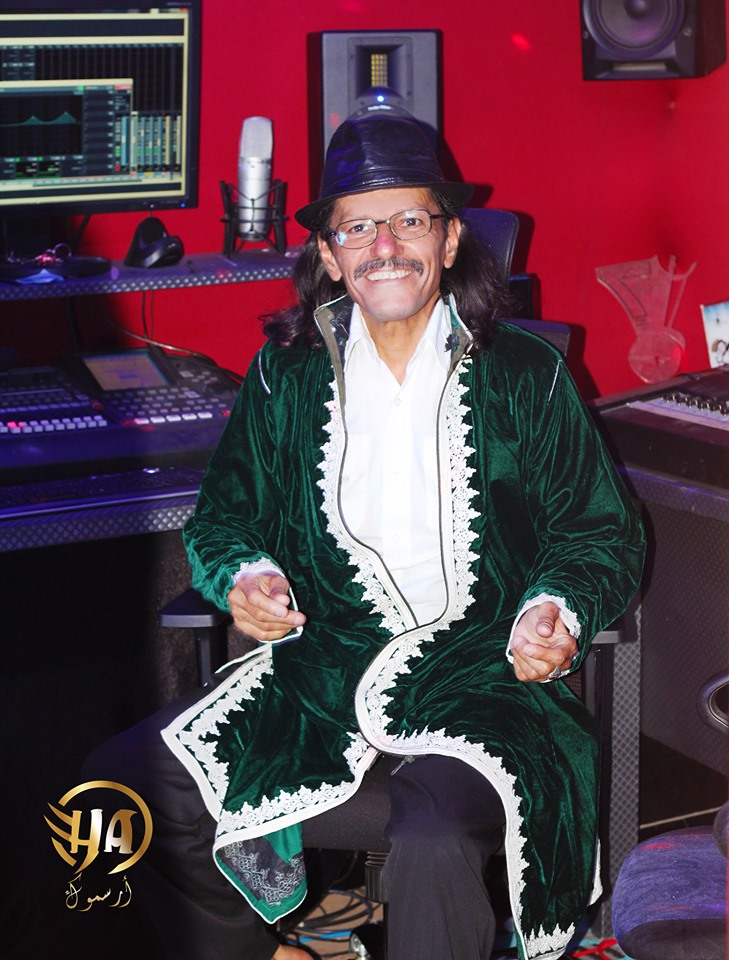

Background information
- Born: 1963 (age 62–63); Anzi, Morocco
- Genres: Berber music
- Labels: Yein France & Tamza Vision, Bani Musique, Agadir Vision Records, Louban Vision, Disco Vision

Hassan Arsmouk (Berber: ⵃⴰⵙⴰⵏ ⴰⵔⵙⵎⵓⴽ, Arabic: حسن أرسموك; born in 1963) is a Moroccan Amazigh singer who was born in a small Chleuh tribe in Tiznit Province.

== Biography ==
Hassan Arsmouk was born in 1963 in the tribe of Irsmouken, a rural commune in the south of Morocco near Tiznit. Thus, his name Arsmouk meaning from Irsmouken in Shilha. His real name is Hassan Bouzman.

His singing career started early when he was young and became increasingly popular starting from the 1990s. His musical band formed several other singers and artists such as Raïs El Houcine Amarrakchi, Raïssa Aïcha Tachinouit, Raïs Saïd Outajajt, Raïssa Mina Tabaamrant, Raïssa Mina Taouirirte.

== Discography ==
Hassan Arsmouk is one of the most prolific modern Amazigh singers with more than 120 recorded songs in more than 18 albums.

== Concerts ==
Hassan Arsmouk has many concerts mostly local wedding ceremonies as well as national and international festivals such as Mawazine.
