= Sous =

Region of Morocco

Sus: بلد سوس (Arabic); ⵜⴰⵎⴰⵣⵉⵔⵜ ⵏ ⵙⵓⵙ (Tachelhit)
- Traditional Region
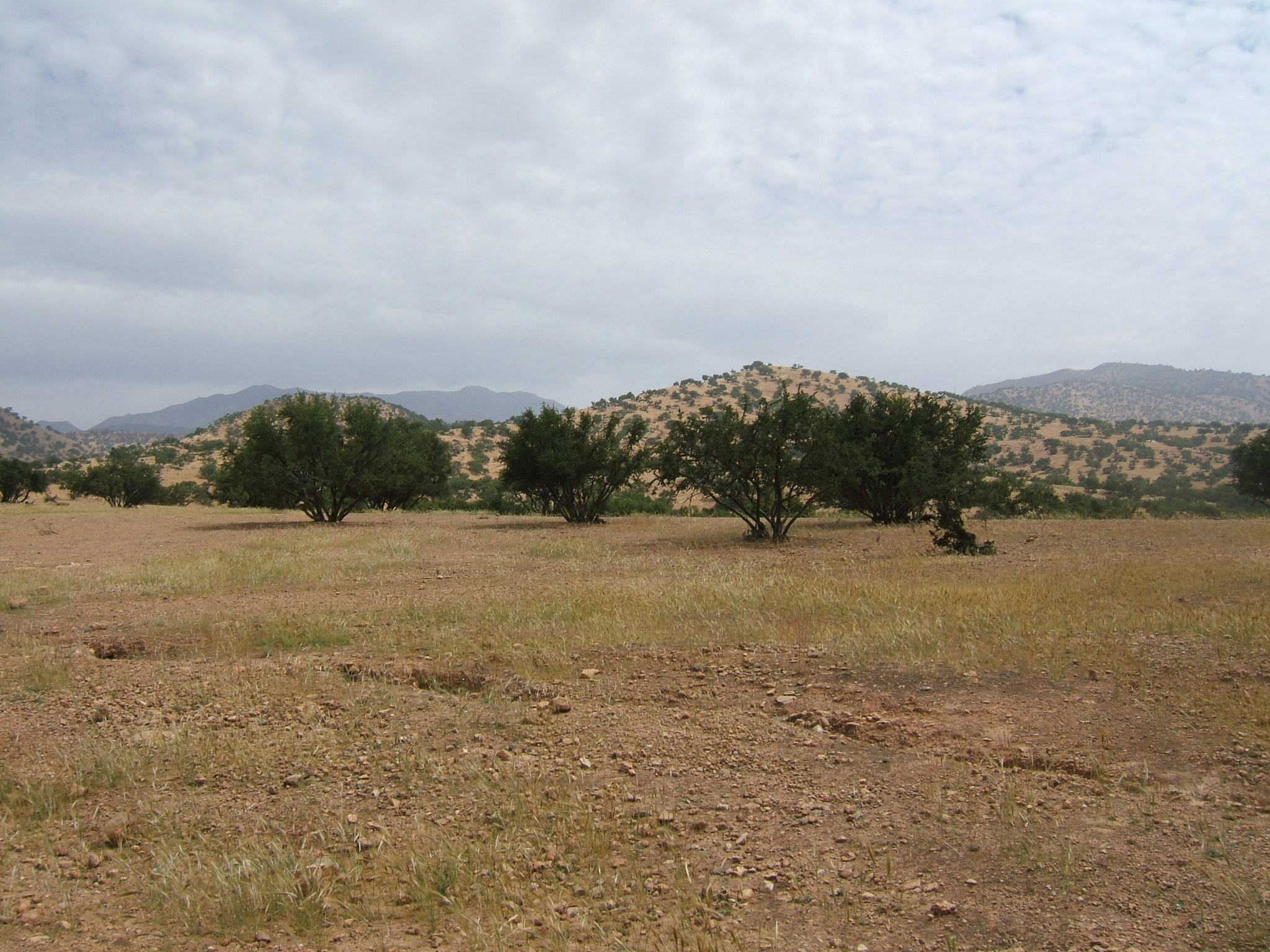
- The Sous, here northeast of Taroudant, with Argan trees interplanted with cereal crops

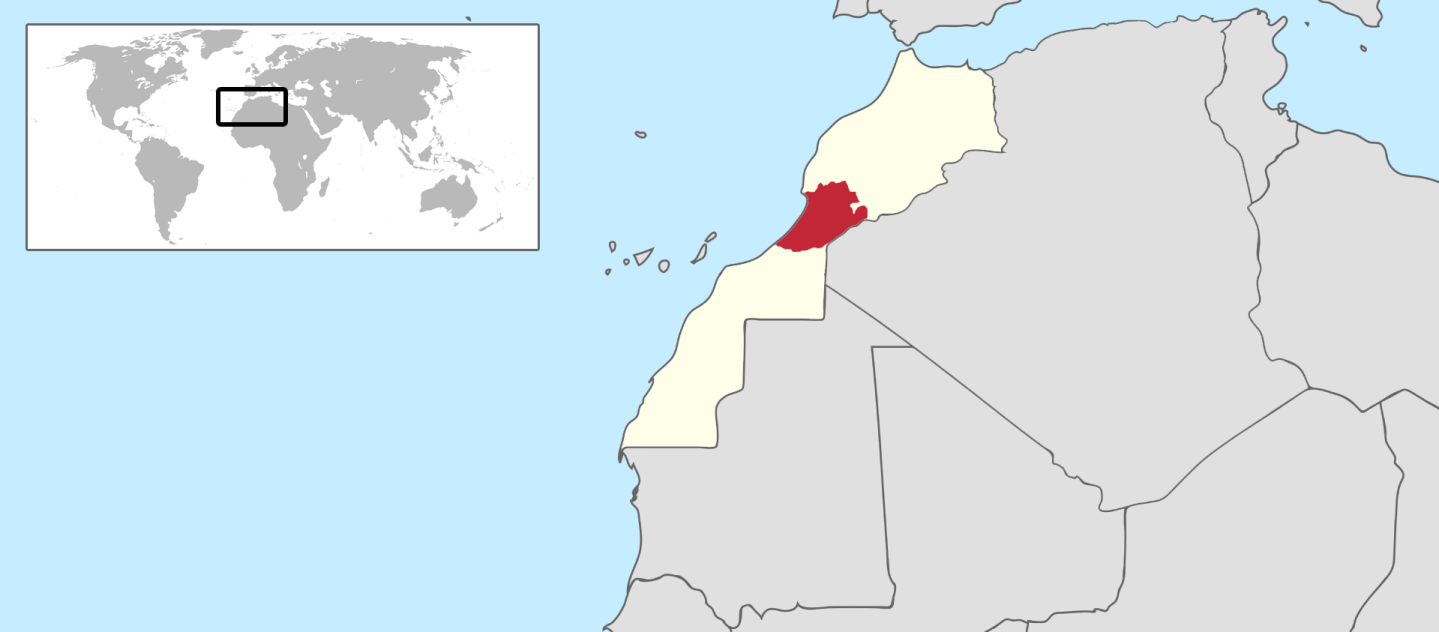
- Coordinates: 30.4°N 9°W
- Country: Morocco
- Region: Souss-Massa, Guelmim-Oued Noun

The Sous region (also spelt Sus, Suss, Souss or Sousse) (Arabic: سوس, romanized: sūs, Tachelhit: ⵙⵓⵙ, romanized: sus) is a historical, cultural and geographical region of Morocco, which constitutes part of the region administration of Souss-Massa and Guelmim-Oued Noun. The region is known for the endemic argan tree (which has become a symbol of Souss) as well as for being the capital of the Shilha Berber ethnic group. It is a major commercial and tourist agricultural region of Morocco. Vegetable production, shared between very large farms and small producers, contributes to the economic development of the region. The Souss plain produces 40% of Moroccan citrus fruits, and 60% of the production of early vegetables. It is historically a stage of trans-Saharan trade.

== History ==
Medieval Arab geographers generally divided the Sous region into two distinct sub-regions: as-Sūs al-Aqṣā (السوس الأقصى 'the far Sus'), and as-Sūs al-Adnā (السوس الأدنى 'the near Sus'). Sus al-Aqsa consisted of the southern/western part, and Sus al-Adna consisted of the northern/eastern part; however, there were never any precise boundaries between the two. The capital of the Sous was at Igli. There was also a ribat at Massa near the Atlantic coast.

== Bibliography ==
- Boogert, Nico van den. The Berber Literary Tradition of the Sous: with an edition and translation of 'The Ocean of Tears' by Muḥammad Awzal (d. 1749), Leiden: Nederlands Instituut voor het Nabije Oosten, 1997. ISBN 90-6258-971-5
- Montagne, Robert. Les Berbères et le Makhzen dans le sud du Maroc; essai sur la transformation politique des Berbères sédentaires (groupe Chleuh). Rabat: Dar Al-Aman, 2013 ISBN 9954-561-35-8.
- UNESCO Arganeraie Biosphere Reserve
