= Shilha language =

Berber language of southwestern Morocco

Shilha
- Tachelhit, Tashelhiyt
- Taclḥiyt / ⵜⴰⵛⵍⵃⵉⵢⵜ / تشلحيت
- Pronunciation: /ˈtæʃəlhɪt/
- Native to: Morocco
- Region: Souss-Massa, Guelmim-Oued Noun, Drâa-Tafilalet, Marrakesh-Safi, Béni Mellal-Khénifra, Laâyoune-Sakia El Hamra and Dakhla-Oued Ed-Dahab
- Ethnicity: Shilha, Berber Jews
- Native speakers: 5.2 million (2024)
- Language family: Afro-Asiatic: Berber; Northern; Atlas; Shilha
- Dialects: Judeo-Berber
- Writing system: Arabic, Latin, Tifinagh

Language codes
- ISO 639-3: shi
- Glottolog: tach1250
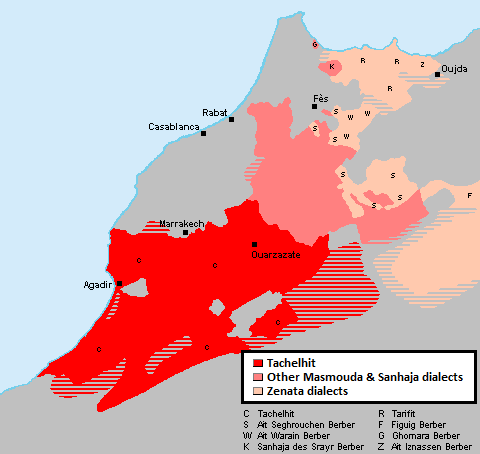
- Tashelhit language area

- Person: Aclḥiy (male); Taclḥiyt (female)
- People: Iclḥiyn (male); Ticlḥiyin (female)
- Language: Taclḥiyt

Young man speaking Tachelhit, recorded in Cuba.

Tashelhiyt or Tachelhit (/ˈtæʃəlhɪt/ TASH-əl-hit; from the endonym Taclḥiyt, IPA: [tæʃlħijt]), (Note: In this article, the graphemes ⟨c⟩ and ⟨j⟩ are used to represent /ʃ/ and /ʒ/ respectively, as is usual in the Berber Latin alphabet; also, ⟨°⟩ is used to indicate labialization (IPA /ʷ/), and ⟨ɛ⟩ is /ʢ/.) also known as Shilha (/ˈʃɪlhə/ SHIL-hə; from its name in Moroccan Arabic, Šəlḥa) is a Berber language of the Afroasiatic language family spoken in southern Morocco by the Shilha people. When referring to the language, anthropologists and historians prefer the name Shilha, which is in the Oxford English Dictionary (OED). Linguists writing in English prefer Tashelhit (or a variant spelling). In French sources the language is called tachelhit, chelha or chleuh.

As of the 2024 Moroccan census, Shilha is spoken by 14.2% of the population, or approximately 5.2 million people. The area comprises the western part of the High Atlas mountains and the regions to the south up to the Draa River, including the Anti-Atlas and the alluvial basin of the Sous River. The largest urban centres in the area are the coastal city of Agadir (population over 400,000) and the towns of Guelmim, Taroudant, Oulad Teima, Tiznit and Ouarzazate.

In the north and to the south, Shilha borders Arabic-speaking areas. In the northeast, roughly along the line Demnate-Zagora, there is a dialect continuum with Central Atlas Tamazight. Within the Shilha-speaking area, there are several Arabic-speaking enclaves, notably the town of Taroudant and its surroundings. Substantial Shilha-speaking migrant communities are found in most of the larger towns and cities of northern Morocco and outside Morocco in Belgium, France, Germany, Canada, the United States and Israel.

Shilha possesses a distinct and substantial literary tradition that can be traced back several centuries before the protectorate era. Many texts, written in Arabic script and dating from the late 16th century to the present, are preserved in manuscripts. A modern printed literature in Shilha has developed since the 1970s.

== Name ==
Shilha speakers usually refer to their language as Taclḥiyt. This name is morphologically a feminine noun, derived from masculine Aclḥiy "male speaker of Shilha". Shilha names of other languages are formed in the same way, for example Aɛṛab "an Arab", Taɛṛabt "the Arabic language".

The origin of the names Aclḥiy and Taclḥiyt has recently become a subject of debate (see Shilha people#Naming for various theories). The presence of the consonant ḥ in the name suggests an originally exonymic (Arabic) origin. The first appearance of the name in a western printed source is found in Mármol's Descripcion general de Affrica (1573), which mentions the "indigenous Africans called Xilohes or Berbers" (los antiguos Affricanos llamados Xilohes o Beréberes).

The initial A- in Aclḥiy is a Shilha nominal prefix (see § Inflected nouns). The ending -iy (borrowed from the Arabic suffix -iyy) forms denominal nouns and adjectives. There are also variant forms Aclḥay and Taclḥayt, with -ay instead of -iy under the influence of the preceding consonant ḥ. The plural of Aclḥiy is Iclḥiyn; a single female speaker is a Taclḥiyt (noun homonymous with the name of the language), plural Ticlḥiyin.

In Moroccan colloquial Arabic, a male speaker is called a Šəlḥ, plural Šluḥ, and the language is Šəlḥa, a feminine derivation calqued on Taclḥiyt. The Moroccan Arabic names have been borrowed into English as a Shilh, the Shluh, and Shilha, and into French as un Chleuh, les Chleuhs, and chelha or, more commonly, le chleuh.

The now-usual names Taclḥiyt and Iclḥiyn in their endonymic use seem to have gained the upper hand relatively recently, as they are attested only in those manuscript texts which date from the 19th and 20th centuries. In older texts, the language is still referred to as Tamaziɣt or Tamazixt "Tamazight". For example, the author Awzal (early 18th c.) speaks of nnaḍm n Tmazixt ann ifulkin "a composition in that beautiful Tamazight".

Because Souss is the most heavily populated part of the language area, the name Tasusiyt (lit. "language of Souss") is now often used as a pars pro toto for the entire language. A speaker of Tasusiyt is an Asusiy, plural Isusiyn, feminine Tasusiyt, plural Tisusiyin.

== Number of speakers ==
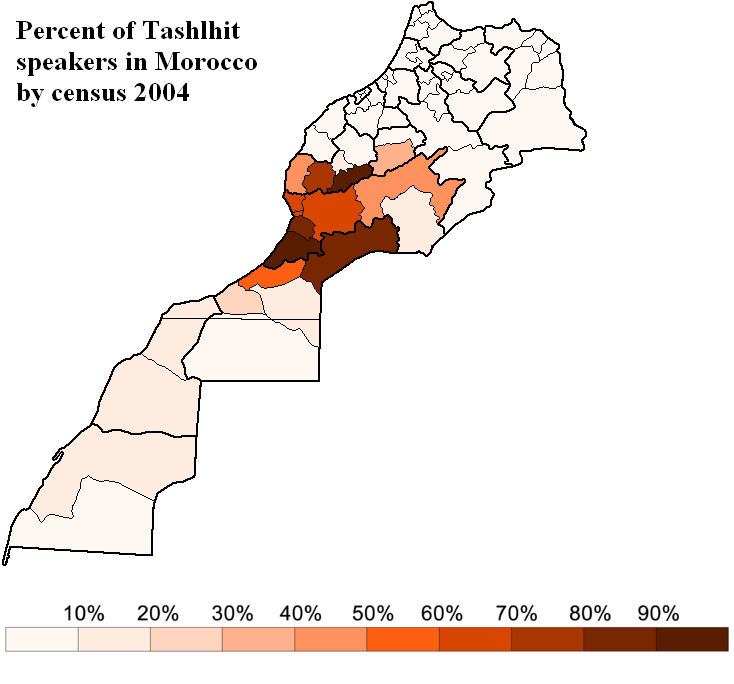
Percentage of Shilha speakers per region according to 2004 census

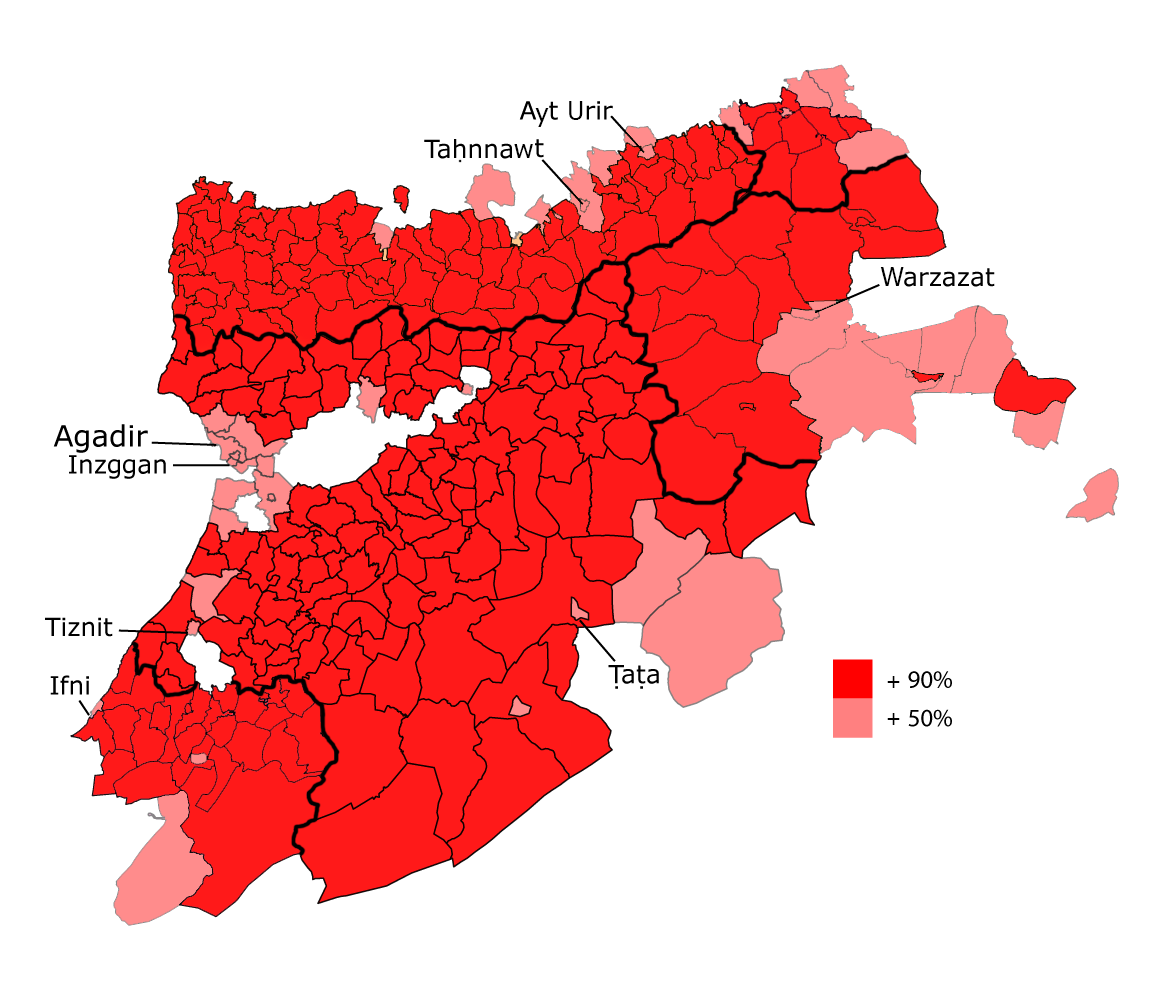
Communes or municipalities where Tachelhit is majority in Morocco (year 2014)

With 4.7 million speakers or 14% of Morocco's population, Tachelhit is the most widely spoken Amazigh language in the Kingdom, ahead of Tamazight and Tarifit. Its speakers represent more than half of the 8.8 million Amazighophones.

It is also the Amazigh language that has the greatest geographical extension in the country. Its speakers are present in 1512 of the 1538 municipalities in the kingdom. This distribution is notably the result of a large diaspora of small traders who have settled throughout the country, but also of workers in search of employment opportunities.

Five Moroccan regions have a rate of Tachelhit speakers higher than the national average: Souss-Massa, Guelmim-Oued Noun, Marrakesh-Safi and Drâa-Tafilalet and Béni Mellal-Khénifra. However, only one of them has a majority of Tachelhit speakers: Souss–Massa with 63.2% of its population. This rate drops to 48.1% for Guelmin-Oued Noun, 25.8% for Drâa-Tafilalet, 24.5% for Marrakesh–Safi, and 14.4% in Béni Mellal-Khénifra.

Like the high concentration of Tachelhit-speaking speakers in Dakhla, Tachelhit is spoken significantly by many inhabitants, in Moroccan municipalities outside the area where the language historically originated. With 49% of its speakers living in cities, Tachelhit has become highly urbanized. Thus, 10% of Casablancais speak Tachelhit, i.e. more than 334,000 people. Casablanca is therefore the first Tachelhit city in Morocco, ahead of Agadir (225,000 speakers). Similarly, 9.2% of Rbatis speak Tachelhit, i.e. more than 52,000 people, or 4% of Tangiers and Oujdis. Finally, there are singular cases of very outlying municipalities such as the fishing village of Imlili, south of Dakhla (60% of speakers). These situations are reminiscent of the historical migrations that have followed one another over the long term and especially the massive rural exodus that began in the 20th century towards the economic metropolises.

== Dialects ==
Dialect differentiation within Shilha, such as it is, has not been the subject of any targeted research, but several scholars have noted that all varieties of Shilha are mutually intelligible. The first was Stumme, who observed that all speakers can understand each other, "because the individual dialects of their language are not very different." This was later confirmed by Ahmed Boukous, a Moroccan linguist and himself a native speaker of Shilha, who stated: "Shilha is endowed with a profound unity which permits the Shluh to communicate without problem, from the Ihahan in the northwest to the Aït Baamran in the southwest, from the Achtouken in the west to the Iznagen in the east, and from Aqqa in the desert to Tassaout in the plain of Marrakesh."

There exists no sharply defined boundary between Shilha dialects and the dialects of Central Atlas Tamazight (CAT). The dividing line is generally put somewhere along the line Marrakesh-Zagora, with the speech of the Ighoujdamen, Iglioua and Aït Ouaouzguite ethnic groups (Note: Shilha ethnic names are quoted here in a conventional French orthography, as is usual in berberological literature. These names are also often given in an Arabicized form, for example Ghoujdama, Glaoua, Fetouaka, etc.) belonging to Shilha, and that of the neighboring Inoultan, Infedouak and Imeghran ethnic groups counted as CAT.

== Writing systems ==
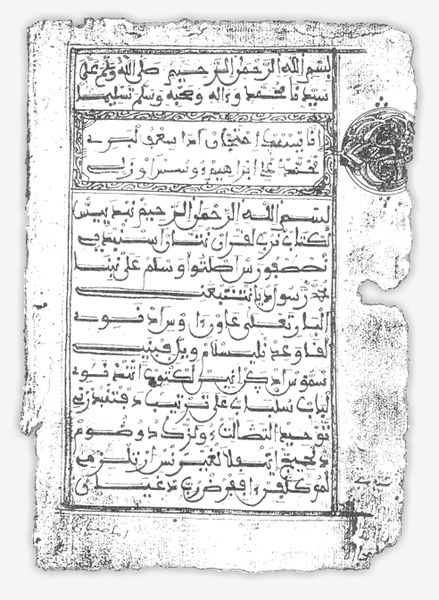
Shilha written in Arabic script: an 18th-century manuscript of al-Ḥawḍ by Mḥmmd Awzal.

Though Tashelhit has historically been an oral language, manuscripts of mostly religious texts have been written in Tashelhit using the Arabic script since at least the 16th century. Today, Tashelhit is most commonly written in the Arabic script, although Neo-Tifinagh is also used.

== Literature ==
Shilha has an extensive body of oral literature in a wide variety of genres (fairy tales, animal stories, taleb stories, poems, riddles, and tongue-twisters). A large number of oral texts and ethnographic texts on customs and traditions have been recorded and published since the end of the 19th century, mainly by European linguists.

Shilha possesses an old literary tradition. Numerous texts written in Arabic script are preserved in manuscripts dating from the 16th century. The earliest datable text is a compendium of lectures on the "religious sciences" (lɛulum n ddin) composed in metrical verses by Brahim u Ɛbdllah Aẓnag, who died in 1597. The best known writer in this tradition is Mḥmmd u Ɛli Awzal, author of al-Ḥawḍ "The Cistern" (a handbook of Maliki law in verse), Baḥr al-Dumūʿ "The Ocean of Tears" (an adhortation, with a description of Judgment Day, in verse) and other texts.

Modern Tashelhit literature has been developing since the end of the 20th century.

== Research ==
The first attempt at a grammatical description of Shilha is the work of the German linguist Hans Stumme (1864–1936), who in 1899 published his Handbuch des Schilḥischen von Tazerwalt. Stumme's grammar remained the richest source of grammatical information on Shilha for half a century. A problem with the work is its use of an over-elaborate, phonetic transcription which, while designed to be precise, generally fails to provide a transparent representation of spoken forms. Stumme also published a collection of Shilha fairy tales (1895, re-edited in Stroomer 2002).

The next author to grapple with Shilha is Saïd Cid Kaoui (Saʿīd al-Sidqāwī, 1859-1910), a native speaker of Kabyle from Algeria. Having published a dictionary of Tuareg (1894), he then turned his attention to the Berber languages of Morocco. His Dictionnaire français-tachelh’it et tamazir’t (1907) contains extensive vocabularies in both Shilha and Central Atlas Tamazight, in addition to some 20 pages of useful phrases. The work seems to have been put together in some haste and must be consulted with caution.

On the eve of the First World War there appeared a small, practical booklet composed by Captain (later Colonel) Léopold Justinard (1878–1959), entitled Manuel de berbère marocain (dialecte chleuh). It contains a short grammatical sketch, a collection of stories, poems and songs, and some interesting dialogues, all with translations. The work was written while the author was overseeing military operations in the region of Fez, shortly after the imposition of the French protectorate (1912). Justinard also wrote several works on the history of the Souss.

Emile Laoust (1876–1952), prolific author of books and articles about Berber languages, in 1921 published his Cours de berbère marocain (2nd enlarged edition 1936), a teaching grammar with graded lessons and thematic vocabularies, some good ethnographic texts (without translations) and a wordlist.

Edmond Destaing (1872–1940) greatly advanced knowledge of the Shilha lexicon with his Etude sur la tachelḥît du Soûs. Vocabulaire français-berbère (1920) and his Textes berbères en parler des Chleuhs du Sous (Maroc) (1940, with copious lexical notes). Destaing also planned a grammar which was to complete the trilogy, but this was never published.

Lieutenant-interpreter (later Commander) Robert Aspinion is the author of Apprenons le berbère: initiation aux dialectes chleuhs (1953), an informative though somewhat disorganized teaching grammar. Aspinion's simple but accurate transcriptions did away with earlier phonetic and French-based systems.

The first attempted description in English is Outline of the Structure of Shilha (1958) by American linguist Joseph Applegate (1925–2003). Based on work with native speakers from Ifni, the work is written in a dense, inaccessible style, without a single clearly presented paradigm. Transcriptions, apart from being unconventional, are unreliable throughout.

The only available accessible grammatical sketch written in a modern linguistic frame is "Le Berbère" (1988) by Lionel Galand (1920–2017), a French linguist and berberologist. The sketch is mainly based on the speech of the Ighchan ethnic group of the Anti-Atlas, with comparative notes on Kabyle of Algeria and Tuareg of Niger.

More recent, book-length studies include Jouad (1995, on metrics), Dell & Elmedlaoui (2002 and 2008, on syllables and metrics), El Mountassir (2009, a teaching grammar), Roettger (2017, on stress and intonation) and the many text editions by Stroomer (see also § Cited works and further reading).

== Phonology ==
=== Stress and intonation ===
There is currently no evidence of word stress in Tashlhiyt.

=== Vowels ===
Shilha has three phonemic vowels, with length not a distinctive feature. The vowels show a fairly wide range of allophones. The vowel /a/ is most often realized as [a] or [æ], and /u/ is pronounced without any noticeable rounding except when adjacent to w. The presence of a pharyngealized consonant invites a more centralized realization of the vowel, as in kraḍ [krɐdˤ] "three", kkuẓ [kkɤzˤ] "four", sḍis [sdˤɪs] "six" (compare yan [jæn] "one", sin [sin] "two", smmus [smmʊs] "five").

	Front	Central	Back
Close	i		u
Open		a	

Additional phonemic vowels occur sporadically in recent loanwords, for example /o/ as in rristora "restaurant" (from French).

==== Transitional vowels and "schwa" ====
In addition to the three phonemic vowels, there are non-phonemic transitional vowels, often collectively referred to as "schwa". Typically, a transitional vowel is audible following the onset of a vowelless syllable CC or CCC, if either of the flanking consonants, or both, are voiced, for example tigmmi [tiɡĭmmi] "house", amḥḍar [amɐ̆ʜdˤɐr] "schoolboy". In the phonetic transcriptions of Stumme (1899) and Destaing (1920, 1940), many such transitional vowels are indicated.

Later authors such as Aspinion (1953), use the symbol ⟨e⟩ to mark the place where a transitional vowel may be heard, irrespective of its quality, and they also write ⟨e⟩ where in reality no vowel, however short, is heard, for example ⟨akessab⟩ /akssab/ "owner of livestock", ⟨ar icetta⟩ /ar iʃtta/ "he's eating". The symbol ⟨e⟩, often referred to as "schwa", as used by Aspinion and others, thus becomes a purely graphical device employed to indicate that the preceding consonant is a syllable onset: [a.k(e)s.sab], [a.ri.c(e)t.ta]. As Galand has observed, the notation of "schwa" in fact results from "habits which are alien to Shilha". And, as conclusively shown by Ridouane (2008), transitional vowels or "intrusive vocoids" cannot even be accorded the status of epenthetic vowels. It is therefore preferable not to write transitional vowels or "schwa", and to transcribe the vowels in a strictly phonemic manner, as in Galand (1988) and all recent text editions. (Note: Text published in the modern orthography in Arabic script also do not represent transitional vowels or "schwa".)

=== Consonants ===
Speech sample in Shilha (Chelha).

The chart below represents Tashlhiyt consonants in IPA, with orthographical representations added between angled brackets when different:

		Labial	Dental		Post- alveolar	Velar		Uvular		Pharyn- geal	Glottal
		Labial	plain	phar.	Post- alveolar	plain	lab.	plain	lab.	Pharyn- geal	Glottal
Nasal		m	n̪								
Plosive	voiceless		t̪	t̪ˤ ⟨ṭ⟩		k	kʷ ⟨k°⟩	q	qʷ ⟨q°⟩		
Plosive	voiced	b	d̪	d̪ˤ ⟨ḍ⟩		g	gʷ ⟨g°⟩				
Fricative	voiceless	f	s̪	s̪ˤ ⟨ṣ⟩	ʃ ⟨c⟩			χ ⟨x⟩	χʷ ⟨x°⟩	ʜ ⟨ḥ⟩	
Fricative	voiced		z̪	z̪ˤ ⟨ẓ⟩	ʒ ⟨j⟩			ʁ ⟨ɣ⟩	ʁʷ ⟨ɣ°⟩	ʢ ⟨ɛ⟩	ɦ ⟨h⟩
Approximant			l̪	l̪ˤ ⟨ḷ⟩	j ⟨y⟩		w				
Trill			r̪	r̪ˤ ⟨ṛ⟩							

Additional phonemic consonants occur sporadically in recent loanwords, for example /bʷ/ as in bb°a "(my) father" (from Moroccan Arabic), and /p/ as in laplaj "beach" (from French).

Like other Berber languages and Arabic, Tashlhiyt has both pharyngealized ("emphatic") and plain dental consonants. There is also a distinction between labialized and plain dorsal obstruents. Consonant gemination or length is contrastive.

==== Semivowels ====
The semivowels /w/ and /j/ have vocalic allophones [u] and [i] between consonants (C_C) and between consonant and pause (C_# and #_C). Similarly, the high vowels /u/ and /i/ can have consonantal allophones [w] and [j] in order to avoid a hiatus. In most dialects, the semivowels are thus in complementary distribution with the high vowels, with the semivowels occurring as onset or coda, and the high vowels as nucleus in a syllable. This surface distribution of the semivowels and the high vowels has tended to obscure their status as four distinct phonemes, with some linguists denying phonemic status to /w/ and /j/.

Positing four distinct phonemes is necessitated by the fact that semivowels and high vowels can occur in sequence, in lexically determined order, for example tazdwit "bee", tahruyt "ewe" (not *tazduyt, *tahrwit). In addition, semivowels /w/ and /j/, like other consonants, occur long, as in afawwu "wrap", tayyu "camel's hump". The assumption of four phonemes also results in a more efficient description of morphology.

In the examples below, w and y are transcribed phonemically in some citation forms, but always phonetically in context, for example ysti- "the daughters of", dars snat istis "he has two daughters".

==== Gemination and length ====
Any consonant in Tashlhiyt, in any position within a word, may be simple or geminate. There may be up to two geminates in a stem, and up to three in a word.

The role of gemination varies:

Word with Simple Consonant		Word with Geminate Consonant		Role of Gemination
Tashlhiyt	Translation	Tashlhiyt	Translation	Role of Gemination
tamda	pond	tamdda	brown buzzard	lexical difference
zdi	to stick (perfect)	zddi	to stick (imperfective)	morphology

Gemination also may occur due to phonological assimilation. For example, the following phrase would be realized as [babllfirma]:

bab n=l-firma
owner of=farm
the owner of the farm

Some consonants are realized differently during morphological gemination; ḍḍ as ṭṭ, ww as gg°, ɣɣ as qq, and ɣɣ° as qq°.

=== Syllable structure ===
Shilha syllable structure has been the subject of a detailed and highly technical discussion by phoneticians. The issue was whether Shilha does or does not have vowelless syllables. According to John Coleman, syllables which are vowelless on the phonemic level have "schwa" serving as vocalic nucleus on the phonetic level. According to Rachid Ridouane on the other hand, Shilha's apparently vowelless syllables are truly vowelless, with all phonemes, vowels as well as consonants, capable of serving as nucleus. The discussion is summed up in Ridouane (2008, with listing of relevant publications), where he conclusively demonstrates that a perfectly ordinary Shilha phrase such as tkkst stt "you took it away" indeed consists of three vowelless syllables [tk.ks.tst:.], each made up of voiceless consonants only, and with voiceless consonants (not "schwa") serving as nucleus. Many definitions of the syllable that have been put forward do not cover the syllables of Shilha.

==== Syllable types ====
The syllable structure of Shilha was first investigated by Dell and Elmedlaoui in a seminal article (1985). They describe how syllable boundaries can be established through what they call "core syllabification". This works by associating a nucleus with an onset, to form a core syllable CV or CC. Segments that are higher on the sonority scale have precedence over those lower on the scale in forming the nucleus in a core syllable, with vowels and semivowels highest on the scale, followed by liquids and nasals, voiced fricatives, voiceless fricatives, voiced stops and voiceless stops. When no more segments are available as onsets, the remaining single consonants are assigned as coda to the preceding core syllable, but if a remaining consonant is identical to the consonant that is the onset of the following syllable, it merges with it to become a long consonant. A morpheme boundary does not necessarily constitute a syllable boundary.

ddan s yaw wurti kcmn iss ad ccin tazart d waḍil
they.went to one EA-orchard they.enter into-it to- they.eat EL-figs with EA-grapes
"they went to an orchard and entered it to eat figs and grapes"

دان سياو ورتي كشمن إيس اد شين تازارت د وضيل	ddan s yaw wurti kcmn iss ad ccin tazart d waḍil
Core syllabification	ddan s yaw wurti kcmn iss ad ccin tazart d waḍil
Coda assignment:	d:an s ya w:urti kcmn is: ad ccin tazart d waḍil

Comparative diagram of the following:

	Example of Phonological Processes in Shilha																						
Gloss of text	they.went		to	one		EA-orchard			they.enter			into-it	to-		they.eat		EL-figs			with	EA-grapes		
Shilha text	ddan		s	yaw		wurti			kcmn			iss	ad		ccin		tazart			d	waḍil		
Core Syll	d	(da)	(ns)	(ya)	w	(wu)	r	(ti)	k	(cm)	(ni)	s	(sa)	(dc)	(ci)	n	(ta)	(za)	r	(td)	(wa)	(ḍi)	l
Coda Assgn.	(d:a)		(ns)	(ya)	(w:ur)			(tik)		(cm)	(ni)	(s:a)		(dc)	(cin)		(ta)	(zar)		(td)	(wa)	(ḍil)	
English trans	"they went to an orchard and entered it to eat figs and grapes"																						

Application of core syllabification produces the following Shilha syllable types:

C V	C: V		
C V C	C: V C	C V C:	C: V C:
C C	C: C	C C:	C: C:
C C C	C: C C	C C C:	C: C C:

Shilha syllable structure can be represented succinctly by the formula CX(C), in which C is any consonant (single/long), and X is any vowel or consonant (single) and with the restriction that in a syllable CXC the X, if it is a consonant, cannot be higher on the resonance scale than the syllable-final consonant, that is, syllables such as [tsk.] and [wrz.] are possible, but not *[tks.] and *[wzr.].

Exceptional syllables of the types X (vowel or single/long consonant) and V(C) (vowel plus single/long consonant) occur in utterance-initial position:

rgl t رگلت[r.glt.] "close it!" (syllable C)
ffɣat فغات[f:.ɣat.] "go out!" (syllable C:)
awi t id او ئي تيد[a.wi.tid.] "bring it here!" (syllable V)
acki d أشكي‌د[ac.kid.] "come here!" (syllable VC)

Another exceptional syllable type, described by Dell and Elmedlaoui (1985), occurs in utterance-final position, when a syllable of the type CC or CC: is "annexed" to a preceding syllable of the type CV or C:V, for example fssamt فسامت"be silent!" is [fs.samt.] not *[fs.sa.mt.].

Since any syllable type may precede or follow any other type, and since any consonant can occur in syllable-initial or final position, there are no phonotactical restrictions on consonant sequences. This also means that the concept of the consonant cluster is not applicable in Shilha phonology, as any number of consonants may occur in sequence:

frḥɣ s lmɛrft nnk
I.am.glad by.means.of the.acquaintance of.you
"I'm glad to make your acquaintance"

فرحغس لمعرفت أنك

[fr.ḥɣs.lm.ɛrf.tn.nk.] (6 syllables, 14 consonants, no vowels)

==== Metrics ====
The metrics of traditional Shilha poems, as composed and recited by itinerant bards (inḍḍamn), was first described and analyzed by Hassan Jouad (thesis 1983, book 1995; see also Dell and Elmedlaoui 2008). The traditional metrical system confirms the existence of vowelless syllables in Shilha, and Jouad's data have been used by Dell and Elmedlaoui, and by Ridouane to support their conclusions.

The metrical system imposes the following restrictions:

- each line in a poem contains the same number of syllables as all the other lines
- each syllable in a line contains the same number of segments as its counterpart in other lines
- each line contains one particular syllable that must begin or end with a voiced consonant
- each line is divided into feet, with the last syllable in each foot stressed ("lifted") in recitation

Within these restrictions, the poet is free to devise his own metrical form. This can be recorded in a meaningless formula called talalayt which shows the number and the length of the syllables, as well as the place of the obligatory voiced consonant (Jouad lists hundreds of such formulae).

The system is illustrated here with a quatrain ascribed to the semi-legendary Shilha poet Sidi Ḥammu (fl. 18th century) and published by Amarir (1987:64):

a titbirin a tumlilin a timgraḍ
ab bahra wr takkamt i lxla hann lbaz
igan bu tassrwalt ig lxatm ɣ uḍaḍ
ak k°nt yut ukan iɣli d ignwan izug

"O white doves, O pets!
Do not venture into the desert too often, for there is the falcon,
Wearing small trousers; he'll put a ring on [your] finger,
To strike you but once — then he ascends into the sky and is gone!"

Application of Dell and Elmedlaoui's core syllabification reveals a regular mosaic of syllables:

	1	2	3	4	5	6	7	8	9	10	11	12
Line 1	a	t í t	b i	r i	n a	t ú m	l i	l i	n a	t í	m g	r á ḍ
Line 2	a	b: á h	r a	w r	t a	k: á m	t i	l x	l a	h á	n: l	b á z
Line 3	i	g á n	b u	t a	s: r	w á l	t i	g l	x a	t ḿ	ɣ u	ḍ á ḍ
Line 4	a	k°: ń t	y u	t u	k a	n í ɣ	l i	d i	g n	w á	n i	z ú g

The poem is composed in a metre listed by Jouad (1995:283) and exemplified by the formula a láy, la li la láy, la li la lá, li lád (the d in the last syllable indicates the position of the compulsory voiced consonant).

== Grammar ==
=== Nouns ===
On the basis of their morphology, three types of Shilha nouns can be distinguished, two indigenous types and one type of external origin:

- inflected nouns
- uninflected nouns
- unincorporated loans

The relevant morpho-syntactic categories are gender, number and state.

==== Inflected nouns ====
Inflected nouns are by far the most numerous type. These nouns can be easily recognised from their outward shape: they begin with a nominal prefix which has the form (t)V-:

azal "daytime"
igigil "orphan"
uṣkay "hound"
tadgg°at "evening"
tibinṣrt "marsh mallow (plant)"
tuḍfit "ant"

Inflected nouns distinguish two genders, masculine and feminine; two numbers, singular and plural; and two states, conventionally referred to by their French names as état libre ("free state") and état d'annexion ("annexed state") and glossed as EL and EA. Gender and number are all explicitly marked, but historical and synchronic sound changes have in some cases resulted in the neutralization of the difference between EL and EA.

The nominal prefix has no semantic content, i.e. it is not a sort of (in)definite article, although it is probably demonstrative in origin. It is made up of one or both of two elements, a gender prefix and a vocalic prefix. Singular feminine nouns may also have a gender suffix. For example, the noun tazdwit "bee" has the feminine prefix t-, the vocalic prefix a- and the feminine singular suffix -t added to the nominal stem zdwi. While feminine inflected nouns always have the feminine prefix, masculine nouns do not have a gender prefix in the free state (EL); for example abaɣuɣ "fox" has no gender prefix, but only a vocalic prefix a- added to the nominal stem baɣuɣ.

Gender is thus marked unambiguously, albeit asymmetrically. In just a handful of nouns, the morphological gender does not conform to the grammatical gender (and number): ulli "sheep and goats" is morphologically masculine singular, but takes feminine plural agreement; alln "eyes" is morphologically masculine plural, but takes feminine plural agreement; tarwa "(someone's) children, offspring" is morphologically feminine singular, but takes masculine plural agreement.

The annexed state (EA) is regularly formed by reducing the vocalic prefix to zero and, with masculine nouns, adding the masculine gender prefix w-:

EL t-a-zdwi-t "bee" → EA t-zdwi-t
EL a-baɣuɣ "fox" → EA w-baɣuɣ

With some nouns, the original vocalic prefix has fused with a stem-initial vowel, to produce an inseparable (and irreducible) vowel:

EL ayyur "moon, month" → EA w-ayyur (not *w-yyur)
EL t-afuk-t "sun" → EA t-afuk-t (not *t-fuk-t)

With feminine nouns that have an inseparable vocalic prefix, the difference between EL and EA is thus neutralized.

While most inflected nouns have a vocalic prefix a-, some have i- (in some cases inseparable), and a few have u- (always inseparable). When a masculine noun has the vocalic prefix i- (separable or inseparable), the masculine gender prefix w- changes to y-. The table below presents an overview (all examples are singular; plurals also distinguish EL and EA):

	Masculine			Feminine	
	EL	EA		EL	EA
"fox"	a-baɣuɣ	w-baɣuɣ	"bee"	t-a-zdwi-t	t-zdwi-t
"moon"	ayyur	w-ayyur	"sun"	t-afuk-t	t-afuk-t
"cave"	i-fri	y-fri	"meat"	t-i-fiyi	t-fiyi
"ash"	iɣd	y-iɣd	"salt"	t-isn-t	t-isn-t
"moufflon"	udad	w-udad	"light"	t-ufaw-t	t-ufaw-t

The EA is not predictable from the shape of the noun, compare:

afus "hand" → EA wfus
afud "knee" → EA wafud

The phonological rules on the realization of /w/ and /j/ apply to the EA as well. For example, the EA of a-mɣar "chief" is /w-mɣar/, realized as wmɣar after a vowel, umɣar after a consonant:

idda wmɣar s dar lqqaḍi "the chief went to see the judge"
imun umɣar d lqqaḍi "the chief accompanied the judge"

Inflected nouns show a great variety of plural formations, applying one or more of the following processes:

- suffixation (masculine -n, feminine -in)
- vowel change (insertion or elision, or ablaut)
- consonant gemination or degemination
- stem extension (+aw, +iw, +t, +w, always in combination with a suffix)

There are also irregular and suppletive plurals. The feminine singular suffix -t is naturally lost in the plural.

Independent from these processes, the separable vocalic prefix a- is always replaced with i-. An inseparable vocalic prefix either remains unchanged, or changes as part of vowel change (but if the vocalic prefix is inseparable in the singular, it may be separable in the plural, as with aduz "dune", and vice versa, as with aydi "dog"; see table below).

Below is a sample of nouns, illustrating various plural formations.

	Singular	Plural	Process(es)
"mountain"	a-drar	i-drar-n	suffixation
"dune"	aduz	i-dazz-n	vowel change, gemination, suffixation
"head"	a-gayyu	i-guyya	vowel change
"ear"	a-mẓẓuɣ	i-mzga-n	(irregular plural)
"waterhole"	anu	una	vowel change
"document"	arra	arra+t-n	stem extension, suffixation
"day"	ass	ussa-n	vowel change, suffixation
"dog"	a-ydi	iḍa-n	(irregular plural)
"forehead"	i-gnzi	i-gnzi+t-n	stem extension, suffixation
"forearm"	i-ɣil	i-ɣall-n	vowel change, gemination, suffixation
"scorpion"	iɣirdm	iɣardm+iw-n	vowel change, stem extension, suffixation
"witness"	i-nigi	i-naga-n	vowel change, suffixation
"slave"	i-smg	i-smga-n	vowel change, suffixation
"face"	udm	udm+aw-n	stem extension, suffixation
"song"	urar	urar-n	suffixation
"jackal"	uccn	uccan-n	vowel change, suffixation
"egg"	t-a-glay-t	t-i-glay	(irregular plural)
"thing"	t-a-ɣawsa	t-i-ɣaws+iw-in	stem extension, suffixation
"mouse"	t-a-ɣrday-t	t-i-ɣrday-in	suffixation
"churn"	t-a-gccul-t	t-i-g°cl-in	vowel change, suffixation, degemination
"fireplace"	t-aka-t	t-aka+t-in	stem extension, suffixation
"woman"	t-a-mɣar-t	t-u-mɣar-in (Note: In a few feminine nouns, the plural vocalic prefix i has become u under the influence of a following m, as in t-u-mɣar-in "women" and t-u-mẓ-in "barley" (cf. Central Atlas Tamazight t-i-mɣar-in, t-i-mẓ-in).)	suffixation
"porcupine"	t-aruc-t	t-urac	vowel change
"key"	t-a-saru-t	t-i-sura	vowel change
"house"	t-i-gmmi	t-i-g°mma	vowel change
"ewe"	t-ili	t-att-n	(suppletive plural)
"meal"	t-irm-t	t-iram	vowel change
"eye"	t-iṭṭ	all-n	(suppletive plural)
"mountain pass"	t-izi	t-izza	vowel change, gemination
"lioness"	t-izm-t	t-izm+aw-in	suffixation, stem extension
"light"	t-ifaw-t	t-ifaw-in	suffixation

The plural is generally not predictable from the shape of the singular, compare:

aduku "shoe", plural idukan (vowel change and suffix)
aruku "utensil", plural irukutn (stem extension and suffix)

Many nouns have more than one plural, for example a-jnwiy "knife", plural i-jnway (vowel change) or i-jnwiy-n (suffixation).

Many Shilha place-names are morphologically inflected nouns:

A-nammr "Anammeur"
I-ɣ°rays-n " Irhoreïsene"
T-a-rudan-t "Taroudant"
T-i-zgzaw-in "Tizegzaouine"

The same is the case with Shilha ethnic names:

Amml-n "the Ammeln" (singular Imml)
Actuk-n "the Achtouken" (singular Actuk)
I-lall-n "the Ilallen" (singular I-lillu)
I-sk°ta-n "the Isouktan" (singular A-sktu)

Among the inflected nouns are found many incorporated loans. Examples include:

t-a-kira "wax" (from Latin)
a-ɣanim "reeds" (from Punic)
urti "vegetable plot, orchard" (from early Romance)
a-muslm "Muslim" (from Arabic)
t-a-bra-t "letter, missive" (from Arabic)

==== Uninflected nouns ====
This is the least common type, which also includes some loans. Examples:

dikkuk "cuckoo"
fad "thirst"
gmz "thumb"
kḍran "tar" (from Arabic)
lagar "station" (from French)
mllɣ "index finger"
sksu "couscous"
wiẓugn "cricket"
xizzu "carrots"

It is probable that all uninflected nouns were originally masculine. The few that now take feminine agreement contain elements that have been reanalyzed as marking feminine gender, for example ttjdmnni "kind of spider" (initial t seen as feminine prefix), hlima "bat" (not an Arabic loanword, but final a analyzed as the Arabic feminine ending).

Many uninflected nouns are collectives or non-count nouns which do not have a separate plural form. Those that have a plural make it by preposing the pluralizer id, for example id lagar "stations".

The uninflected noun mddn or middn "people, humans" is morphologically masculine singular but takes masculine plural agreement.

Names of people and foreign place-names can be seen as a subtype of uninflected nouns, for example Musa (man's name), Muna (woman's name), Fas "Fès", Brdqqiz "Portugal". Gender is not transparently marked on these names, but those referring to humans take gender agreement according to the natural sex of the referent (male/masculine, female/feminine).

==== Unincorporated loans ====
These are nouns of Arabic origin (including loans from French and Spanish through Arabic) which have largely retained their Arabic morphology. They distinguish two genders (not always unambiguously marked) and two numbers (explicitly marked). A notable feature of these nouns is that they are borrowed with the Arabic definite article, which is semantically neutralized in Shilha:

Moroccan Arabic l-kabus "the pistol" → Shilha lkabus "the pistol, a pistol"
Moroccan Arabic t-tabut "the coffin" → Shilha ttabut "the coffin, a coffin"

The Arabic feminine ending -a is often replaced with the Shilha feminine singular suffix -t:

Moroccan Arabic l-faky-a → Shilha lfaki-t "fruit"
Moroccan Arabic ṛ-ṛuḍ-a → Shilha ṛṛuṭ-ṭ "tomb of a saint"

Arabic loans usually retain their gender in Shilha. The exception are Arabic masculine nouns which end in t; these change their gender to feminine in Shilha, with the final t reanalyzed as the Shilha feminine singular suffix -t:

Moroccan Arabic l-ḥadit "the prophetic tradition" (masculine) → Shilha lḥadi-t (feminine)
Moroccan Arabic l-mut "death" (masculine) → Shilha lmu-t (feminine)

Arabic plurals are usually borrowed with the singulars. If the borrowed plural is not explicitly marked for gender (according to Arabic morphology) it has the same gender as the singular:

lbhim-t "domestic animal" (feminine), plural lbhaym (feminine)
lbzim "buckle" (masculine), plural lbzaym (masculine)

Loanwords whose singular is masculine may have a plural which is feminine, and marked as such (according to Arabic morphology), for example lɛlam "flag" (masculine), plural lɛlum-at (feminine).

==== Use of the annexed state ====
The annexed state (EA) of an inflected noun is used in a number of clearly defined syntactical contexts:

- when the noun occurs as subject in postverbal position:

tfulki tmazirt nnun
it.is.beautiful EA-country of.you
"your country is beautiful"

tamazirt nnun tfulki
EL-country of.you it.is.beautiful
"[as for] your country, it is beautiful"

- after most prepositions (see also § Prepositions):

tiskrt d uẓalim
EL-garlic with EA-onions
"garlic and onions" (EL aẓalim)

tangult n uɣrum
EL-loaf of EA-bread
"a loaf of bread" (EL aɣrum)

- after numerals 1 to 10 and after the indefinite numeral (see also § Numerals):

kraṭṭ tmkilin
three EA-dishes
(EL timkilin)

mnnaw wussan
many EA-days
(EL ussan)

- after some elements which require a following noun phrase (see also § Possessed nouns):

ayt Ugadir "the people of Agadir"
bu tɣanimt "he with EA-reed: flute player" (EL taɣanimt)

- after wan "like, such as" (premodern, obsolete in the modern language)

wan uɣu smmiḍn
like EA-milk which.is.cold
"like cold milk, such as cold milk"

Outside these contexts, the EL is used. Uninflected nouns and unincorporated loans, which do not distinguish state, remain unchanged in these contexts.

==== Semantics of feminine nouns ====
The formation of feminine nouns from masculine nouns is a productive process. A feminine noun is formed by adding both the feminine nominal prefix t- (and, if necessary, a vocalic prefix), and the feminine singular suffix -t to a masculine noun. The semantic value of the feminine derivation is variable.

For many nouns referring to male and female humans or animals (mainly larger mammals), matching masculine and feminine forms exist with the same nominal stem, reflecting the sex of the referent:

adgal "widower" → tadgalt "widow"
amuslm "Muslim" → tamuslmt "Muslima"
ikni "twin boy" → tiknit "twin girl"
afullus "cock, rooster" → tafullust "hen"
izm "lion" → tizmt "lioness"
udad "moufflon" → tudatt "female moufflon"

In a few cases there are suppletive forms:

argaz "man, husband" ― tamɣart "woman, wife"
ankkur "buck" ― taɣaṭṭ "goat"

Feminine nouns derived from masculine nouns with inanimate reference have diminutive meaning:

aẓru "stone" → taẓrut "small stone"
ifri "cave" → tifrit "hole, lair"
lbit "room" → talbitt "small room"
ṣṣnduq "box" → taṣṣnduqt "little box"
urti "garden" → turtit "small garden"

Conversely, a masculine noun derived from a feminine noun has augmentative meaning:

tamda "lake" → amda "large lake"
tigmmi "house" → igmmi "large house"
tiznirt "fan palm" → iznir "large fan palm"

Feminine nouns derived from masculine collective nouns have singulative meaning:

asngar "maize" → tasngart "a cob"
iﬁfl "peppers" → tiﬁflt "a pepper"
bitljan "aubergines" → tabitljant "an aubergine"
luqid "matches" → taluqitt "a match"

Feminine derivations are also used as names of languages, professions and activities:

ahulandiy "Dutchman" → tahulandiyt "the Dutch language"
fransis "the French" → tafransist "the French language"
amzil "blacksmith" → tamzilt "blacksmith's profession"
inmmtri "beggar" → tinmmtrit "begging"
lmumsik "miser" → talmumsikt "avarice"
g°ma "(my) brother" → tag°mat "brotherhood"

There is an overlap here with feminine nouns denoting females:

tafransist "Frenchwoman" and "the French language"
tinmmtrit "beggarwoman" and "begging"

==== Nominal deictic clitics ====
There are three deictic clitics which can follow a noun: proximal a-d "this, these", distal a-nn "that, those" (compare § Verbal deictic clitics) and anaphoric lli "the aforementioned":

tammnt ad ur tɣ°li "[as for] this honey, it is not expensive"
yaɣ usmmiḍ taɣaṭṭ ann bahra "the cold has badly afflicted that goat"
ifk ṭṭir lli i tazzanin ar srs ttlɛabn "then he gave the bird to some children to play with"

=== Personal pronouns ===
There are three basic sets of personal pronouns:

- independent
- direct object clitics
- suffixes

In addition, there are two derived sets which contain the suffixed pronouns (except in 1st singular):

- indirect object clitics
- possessive complements

Gender is consistently marked on 2nd singular, and on 2nd and 3rd plural. Gender is not consistently marked on 3rd singular and 1st plural. Gender is never marked on 1st singular.

			Independent	Direct object clitics	Suffixes	Indirect object clitics	Possessive complements
1	sg.		nkki(n)	yyi	V-Ø / C-i	yyi	V nw / C inw
1	pl.	m.	nkk°ni(n)	a(n)ɣ	-nɣ	a-(n)ɣ	nnɣ
1	pl.	f.	nkk°nti(n)	a(n)ɣ	-nɣ	a-(n)ɣ	nnɣ
2	sg.	m.	kyyi(n)	k	-k	a-k	nn-k
2	sg.	f.	kmmi(n)	km	-m	a-m	nn-m
2	pl.	m.	k°nni(n)	k°n	V-wn / C-un	a-wn	nn-un
2	pl.	f.	k°nnimti(n)	k°nt	V-wnt / C-unt	a-wnt	nn-unt
3	sg.	m.	ntta(n)	t	-s	a-s	nn-s
3	sg.	f.	nttat	tt / stt	-s	a-s	nn-s
3	pl.	m.	nttni(n)	tn	-sn	a-sn	nn-sn
3	pl.	f.	nttnti(n)	tnt	-snt	a-snt	nn-snt
∅ = zero morpheme

The independent ("overt") pronouns are used to topicalize the subject or the object.

nkk°ni wr a nlssa turẓyin n wagg°ri
we not {} we.wear EL-sandals of EA-alfa
"as for us, we don't wear sandals [made] of alfa"

tumɣarin nttntin a ybnnun andaru n ifullusn
EL-women they it.is.that who.is.building EL-coop of EA-chickens
"the women, they're the ones who (usually) build a chicken coop"

They are also used with certain pseudo-prepositions such as zund "like", abla "except":

ɛlah, nkki, giɣ aɣyul zund kyyi?
why I I.am EL-ass like you
"why, [as for] me, am I an ass like you?"

ur iqqadda ay yak°r abla k°nni
not it.is.likely that he.steals except you.mpl
"no one could have stolen [it] except you lot"

The direct object clitics are used with transitive verbs:

yuzn tn s tmzgida
he-sent them to EA-Koranic.school
"he sent them to the Koranic school"

iɣ yyi yut ar ttrwalɣ
when me he.beats {} I.am.running.away
"when he beats me I run away"

The 3rd singular feminine variant stt is used after a dental stop, compare:

awi tt id "bring her here!" (imperative singular)
awyat stt id "bring her here!" (imperative plural masculine)

The direct object clitics are also used to indicate the subject with pseudo-verbs, and with the presentative particle ha "here is, voici":

waḥdu yyi (alone me) "I alone"
kullu tn (all them) "they all, all of them"
laḥ t (absent him) "he's not there, he's disappeared"
manza tt (where her) "where is she?"
ha yyi (here.is me) "here I am"

The pronominal suffixes are used with prepositions to indicate the object (see § Prepositions), and with a closed set of necessarily possessed kinship terms to indicate possession (see § Possessed nouns). The plural forms add an infix -t- before the suffix with kinship terms, for example baba-t-nɣ "our father" (never *baba-nɣ); this infix also occurs with some prepositions as a free or dialectal variant of the form without the -t-:

flla-sn or flla-t-sn "on them"
dar-sn "with them" (never *dar-t-sn)

The indirect object clitics convey both benefactive and detrimental meaning:

alliɣ immut babas ifl as d ayda nns
when he.died father-her he.left to.her hither EL-possessions of.him
"when her father died he left her his possessions"

tamurɣi tcca y as tibḥirt nns
EL-locust she.ate {} to.her EL-vegetable.patch of.her
"the locusts, they've eaten her vegetable patch"

The possessive complements follow the noun (see § Possession).

=== Prepositions ===
Prepositions can have up to three different forms, depending on the context in which they are used:

- before a noun or demonstrative pronoun
- with a pronominal suffix
- independent in relative clause

The form before nouns and demonstrative pronouns and the independent form are identical for most prepositions, the exception being the dative preposition i (independent mi, mu).

Before noun or demonstrative pronoun	Independent	With pronominal suffix	Translation equivalents
ar	—	—	terminative: "until, as far as"
d	d	id-, did-	comitative: "with, in the company of; and"
dar	dar	dar-	"at the place of, chez"
ddu	...	ddaw-, ddawa-	"beneath, under"
f	f	flla-	"on; because of"
gr	...	gra-	"between"
(i)ngr	...	(i)ngra-	"among"
ɣ	ɣ	gi(g)-	locative: "in, at"
i	mi, mu	(indirect object clitics)	dative: "for, to"
n	—	(possessive complements)	possessive: "of"
nnig	...	nniga-	"above"
s	s	is-	instrumental: "with, by means of"
s	s	sr-	allative: "to, toward"
zɣ	zɣ	zgi(g)-	ablative: "from"
— inexistent... unattested, probably inexistent

Most prepositions require a following inflected noun to be in the annexed state (EA) (see § Use of the annexed state). Exceptions are ar "until", s "toward" (in some modern dialects, and in premodern texts) and prepositions borrowed from Arabic (not in the table) such as bɛd "after" and qbl "before".

The instrumental and allative prepositions s "by means of" (with EA) and s "toward" (with EL) were still consistently kept apart in premodern manuscript texts. In most modern dialects they have been amalgamated, with both now requiring the EA, and with the pre-pronominal forms each occurring with both meanings: sr-s "toward it" (now also "with it"), is-s "with it" (now also "toward it").

The use of the different forms is illustrated here with the preposition ɣ "in":

iḍr unẓar izwarn ɣ ukccum n ktubr
it.fell EA-rain which.is.first in EA-beginning of October
"the first rain fell in the beginning of October"

ggawrn gisnt ar ssan lqhwa
{they sit} in.them {} they're.drinking coffee
"they sit in them [i.e., cafés] drinking coffee"

urti ɣ llan lacjar lli stɣllanin ar ittyiswa
EL-orchard in.which they.exist trees that they.are.bearing.fruit {} it.is.irrigated
"an orchard in which there are fruit-bearing trees is usually irrigated"

Two prepositions can be combined:

illa yglgiz lli yttzdaɣn ɣ ddu tsbnit
it.exists EA-beetle that it.is.living in under EA-dung
"there is a [kind of] beetle that lives beneath the dung"

ar ttddan {s dar} uḥjjam ɣ Tfrawt
they.are.going to at.the.place.of EA-barber in EA-Tafraout
"they always go to a barber in Tafraout"

Spatial relations are also expressed with phrases of the type "on top of":

ɣ iggi n umdduz "on top of the dung heap"
ɣ tama n uɣaras "beside the road"
ɣ tuẓẓumt n wasif "in the midst of the river"

The preposition gi(g)- "in" with pronominal suffixes, with all its free and dialectal variants, is presented below. The other prepositions display a much smaller variety of forms.

	gig-	gi-	with -t-	irregular
1 sg.	gig-i	gi-Ø	gi-t-i	
2 sg.m.	gik-k	gi-k		
2 sg.f.	gig-m	gi-m		
3 sg.		gi-s		giz, gid, git
1 pl.	gig-nɣ	gi-(n)ɣ	gi-t-nɣ	
2 pl.m.	gig-un	gi-wn	gi-t-un	
2 pl.f.	gig-unt	gi-wnt	gi-t-unt	
3 pl.m.		gi-sn	gi-t-sn	gizn, gidsn
3 pl.f.		gi-snt	gi-t-snt	giznt, gidsnt

=== Numerals ===
The inherited cardinal numeral system consists of ten numerals (still in active use) and three numeral nouns (now obsolete) for "a tensome", "a hundred" and "a thousand". There is also an indefinite numeral meaning "several, many" or "how many?" which morphologically and syntactically patterns with the numerals 1 to 10. For numbers of 20 and over, Arabic numerals are commonly used.

==== Numerals 1 to 10, indefinite numeral ====
These are listed below. The formation of feminine "one" and "two" is irregular.

	Masculine	Feminine
"one"	ya-n	ya-t
"two"	sin	sna-t
"three"	kraḍ	kraṭ-ṭ
"four"	kkuẓ	kkuẓ-t
"five"	smmus	smmus-t
"six"	sḍis	sḍis-t
"seven"	sa	sa-t
"eight"	tam	tam-t
"nine"	tẓa	tẓa-t
"ten"	mraw	mraw-t
indefinite	mnnaw	mnnaw-t

The numerals 1 to 10 are constructed with nouns (inflected nouns in the EA), the gender of the numeral agreeing with that of the noun:

yan wag°mar
"one EA-horse"

yat tfunast
"one EA-cow"

sin wag°marn
"two EA-horses"

snat tfunasin
"two EA-cows"

(Note: Examples presented here of numerals with horses and cows are extrapolated from attested constructions.) The same obtains with the indefinite numeral:

mnnaw wag°marn "several/many EA-horses, how many horses?"
mnnawt tfunasin "several/many EA-cows, how many cows?"

Numerals yan, yat "one" also serve as indefinite article, for example yan urumiy "one Westerner, a Westerner", and they are used independently with the meaning "anyone" (yan), "anything" (yat):

ur iẓri ḥtta yan "he didn't see anyone"
ur ksuḍɣ yat "I'm not afraid of anything"

The final n of masculine yan "one" and sin "two" is often assimilated or fused to a following w, y or l:

yan w-ass → yaw wass "one EA-day"
yan w-sgg°as → ya wsgg°as "one EA-year"
yan lmakan → yal lmakan "a place"
sin y-sgg°as-n → si ysgg°asn "two EA-years"
sin y-ir-n → siy yirn "two EA-months"

==== Teens ====
The teens are made by connecting the numerals 1 to 9 to the numeral 10 with the preposition d "with". In the premodern language, both numerals took the gender of the counted noun, with the following noun in the plural (EA):

sin d mraw wag°marn
two with ten EA-horses
"twelve horses"

snat d mrawt tfunasin
two with ten EA-cows
"twelve cows"

In the modern language, fused forms have developed in which the first numeral is always masculine, while the following noun is in the singular, and connected with the preposition n "of":

sindmraw n wag°mar
twelve of EA-horse
"twelve horses"

sindmrawt n tfunast
twelve of EA-cow
"twelve cows"

==== Tens, hundreds, thousands ====
There are three inherited nouns to denote "a tensome", "a hundred" and "a thousand". These now seem to be obsolete, but they are well attested in the premodern manuscripts. Morphologically, they are ordinary inflected nouns.

	Singular		Plural	
	EL	EA	EL	EA
"a tensome"	t-a-mraw-t	t-mraw-t	t-i-mraw-in	t-mraw-in
"a hundred"	t-i-miḍi	t-miḍi	t-i-maḍ	t-maḍ
"a thousand"	ifḍ	y-ifḍ	afḍa-n	w-afḍa-n

The tens, hundreds and thousand were formed by combining the numerals 1 to 10 with the numeral nouns:

snat tmrawin
two EA-tensomes
"twenty"

snat tmaḍ
two EA-hundreds
"two hundred"

sin wafḍan
two EA-thousands
"two thousand"

The numeral nouns are connected with the preposition n "of" to a noun, which is most often in the singular:

timiḍi n wag°mar
EL-hundred of EA-horse
"a hundred horses"

snat tmaḍ n wag°mar
two EA-hundreds of EA-horse
"two hundred horses"

ifḍ n tfunast
EL-thousand of EA-cow
"a thousand cows"

sin wafḍan n tfunast
two EA-thousands of EA-cow
"two thousand cows"

In the modern language the Arabic tens are used, which have developed a separate feminine form:

ɛcrin n wag°mar
twenty of EA-horse
"twenty horses"

ɛcrint n tfunast
twenty of EA-cow
"twenty cows"

The numerals between the tens are most frequently made with the Arabic numerals 1 to 10:

xmsa w ɛcrin n wag°mar
five and twenty of EA-horse
"twenty-five horses"

xmsa w ɛcrint n tfunast
five and twenty of EA-cow
"twenty-five cows"

The Arabic hundreds and thousands are used in the modern language, taking the places of the original numeral nouns while the original syntax is maintained:

miya n wag°mar
hundred of EA-horse
"a hundred horses"

snat id miya n wag°mar
two PL hundred of EA-horse
"two hundred horses"

alf n tfunast
thousand of EA-cow
"a thousand cows"

sin walfiwn n tfunast
two EA-thousands of EA-cow
"two thousand cows"

There is also a vigesimal system built on the Arabic numeral ɛcrin "twenty, score", for example:

sin id ɛcrint n tfunast
two PL score of EA-cow
"forty cows"

==== Ordinal numerals ====
First and last are usually expressed with relative forms of the verbs izwur "to be first" and ggru "to be last":

tawriqqt izwarn
page which.is.first
"the first page"

ussan gg°ranin
days which.are.last
"the last days"

There are also agent nouns derived from these verbs which are apposed to a noun or used independently:

aḍrf amzwaru
furrow the.first.one
"the first furrow"

tucka d tamggarut
she.arrived hither the.last.one
"she arrived last"

The other ordinals are formed by prefixing masc. wis-, fem. tis- to a cardinal numeral, which is then constructed with a plural noun in the usual manner:

wis-kraḍ wussan
ORD-three EA-days
"the third day"

tis-kraṭṭ twal
ORD-three EA-times
"the third time"

The ordinal prefixes is also used with Arabic numerals and with the indefinite numeral:

wis-xmsa w-ɛcrin n dulqqiɛda "the 25th [day] of [the month] Dhū al-Qaʿda"
wis-mnnawt twal "the how-manieth time?"

Because four of the numerals 1 to 10 begin with s, the geminated ss that results from the prefixation of wis-, tis- (as in wissin, wissmmus, etc.) is often generalized to the other numerals: wissin, wisskraḍ, wisskkuẓ, etc.

=== Verbs ===
A Shilha verb form is basically a combination of a person-number-gender (PNG) affix and a mood-aspect-negation (MAN) stem.

==== Sample verb ====
The workings of this system are illustrated here with the full conjugation of the verb fk "to give". The perfective negative goes with the negation wr "not". The imperfective goes with the preverbal particle ar (except usually the imperative, and the relative forms).

	Aorist	Perfective	Perfective negative	Imperfective
MAN stem→	fk(i)	fki/a	fki	akka
1 sg.	fk-ɣ	fki-ɣ	ur fki-ɣ	ar akka-ɣ
2 sg.	t-fk-t	t-fki-t	ur t-fki-t	ar t-akka-t
3 sg.m.	i-fk	i-fka	ur i-fki	ar y-akka
3 sg.f.	t-fk	t-fka	ur t-fki	ar t-akka
1 pl.	n-fk	n-fka	ur n-fki	ar n-akka
2 pl.m.	t-fki-m	t-fka-m	ur t-fki-m	ar t-akka-m
2 pl.f.	t-fki-mt	t-fka-mt	ur t-fki-mt	ar t-akka-mt
3 pl.m.	fki-n	fka-n	ur fki-n	ar akka-n
3 pl.f.	fki-nt	fka-nt	ur fki-nt	ar akka-nt
Imperative				
2 sg.	fk			akka
2 pl.m.	fk-at			akka-y-at
2 pl.f.	fk-amt			akka-y-amt
Relative				
sg.		i-fka-n	ur i-fki-n	y-akka-n
pl.		fka-n-in	ur fki-n-in	akka-n-in

The verb fk "give" has the full complement of four different MAN stems:

- Aorist fk(i) ― fk in 1st, 2nd and 3rd singular, 1st plural, and the imperatives, but fki in 2nd and 3rd plural
- Perfective fki/a ― fki in 1st and 2nd singular, but fka with the other forms
- Perfective negative fki ― all forms
- Imperfective akka (an irregular formation) ― all forms

==== Person-number-gender affixes ====
There are two basic sets of PNG affixes, one set marking the subject of ordinary verb forms, and another set marking the subject of imperatives.

Two suffixes (singular -n, plural -in) are added to the 3rd singular and masculine 3rd plural masculine verb forms respectively to make relative forms (also known as "participles"), as in i-fka-n "who gives", fka-n-in "who give". (Note: Each relative form is now used for both genders. An obsolete feminine singular relative form t-…-t is found in some manuscript texts, for example tikki t-ɛḍm-t (gift which.is.glorious) "a glorious gift" (modern tikki y-ɛḍm-n).)

1 sg		...	-ɣ
2 sg.	t-	...	-t
3 sg.m.	y-	...	
3 sg.f.	t-	...	
1 pl.	n-	...	
2 pl.m.	t-	...	-m
2 pl.f.	t-	...	-mt
3 pl.m.		...	-n
3 pl.f.		...	-nt
Imperative			
2 sg.		...	-Ø
2 pl.m.		...	-at
2 pl.f.		...	-amt
Relative			
3 sg.	y-	...	-n
3 pl.		...	-n-in

==== Mood-aspect-negation stems ====
A few verbs have just one MAN stem. The majority of verbs have two, three or four different MAN stems. The Aorist stem serves as the citation form of a verb. The list below offers an overview of MAN stem paradigms. Around 15 paradigms of non-derived verbs can be recognized, based on the formation of the Perfective and the Perfective negative. Further subdivisions could be made on the basis of the formations of the Imperfective. All sections in the list contain a selection of verbs, except sections 12, 14, and 15, which contain a full listing.

		Aorist	Perfective	Perfective negative	Imperfective
1	"laugh"	ḍssa	ḍssa	ḍssa	ḍssa
	"bark"	ttaɣ	ttaɣ	ttaɣ	ttaɣ
2	"accompany"	mun	mun	mun	tt-mun
	"sit"	skkiws	skkiws	skkiws	skkiwis, tt-skiwis
	"be crazy"	nufl	nufl	nufl	tt-nuful
3	"enter"	kcm	kcm	kcim	kccm
	"graze"	frd	frd	frid	ffrd
	"mention"	bdr	bdr	bdir	addr, tt-bdar
	"ascend, climb"	ɣly	ɣly	ɣliy	aqqlay
	"open, be open"	rẓm	rẓm	rẓim	tt-nurẓum
4	"fall"	ḍr	ḍr	ḍir	ṭṭar
	"hit"	wt	wt	wit	kkat
5	"break, be broken"	rẓ(i)	rẓi/a	rẓi	rẓẓa
	"eat"	cc(i)	cci/a	cci	ctta
	"give"	fk(i)	fki/a	fki	akka
	"show, explain"	ml(i)	mli/a	mli	mmal
	"drink"	sw(i)	swi/a	swi	ssa
	"call"	ɣr(i)	ɣri/a	ɣri	aqqra
	"be; put"	g(i)	gi/a	gi	tt-gga
6	"sew"	gnu	gni/a	gni	gnna, gnnu, tt-gnu
	"go"	ftu	fti/a	fti	fttu, tt-ftu
	"go"	ddu	ddi/a	ddi	tt-dda, tt-ddu, tt-udu
	"divide"	bḍu	bḍi/a	bḍi	aṭṭa
7	"be better"	af	uf	uf	tt-afa
	"fly"	ayll	uyll	uyll	tt-aylal
	"give back"	rar	rur	rur	tt-rara
	"inherit"	kkas	kkus	kkus	tt-kasa
8	"take"	amẓ	umẓ	umiẓ	tt-amẓ
	"steal"	ak°r	ukr	ukir	tt-ak°r
	"help"	aws	iws	iwis	tt-aws
	"run"	azzl	uzzl	uzzil	tt-azzal
9	"find"	af(i)	ufi/a	ufi	tt-afa
	"come"	ack(i)	ucki/a	ucki	tt-acka
10	"flay"	azu	uzi/a	uzi	tt-azu
	"contain"	amu	umi/a	umi	tt-amu
11	"hold, possess"	ṭṭf, ṭṭaf	ṭṭf, ṭṭaf	ṭṭif	tt-ṭṭf, tt-ṭṭaf
	"take away"	kks, kkis	kks, kkis	kkis	tt-kks, tt-kkis
	"go out"	ffɣ, ffuɣ	ffɣ, ffuɣ	ffiɣ	tt-ffɣ, tt-ffuɣ
12	"die"	mmt	mmut	mmut	tt-mttat
13	"be afraid"	iksuḍ, ksuḍ	ksaḍ	ksaḍ	tt-iksuḍ, tt-ksuḍ
	"be first, precede"	izwur, zwur	zwar	zwar	tt-izwur, zgg°ur
14	"possess"	ili	li/a	li	tt-ili
	"want"	iri	ri/a	ri	tt-iri
15	"exist"	ili	lli/a	lli	tt-ili
	"say"	ini	nni/a	nni	tt-ini

==== Uses of MAN stems ====
The table below is adapted from Kossmann (2012:40, table 2.12 Uses of MAN stems in Figuig Berber).

MAN stem	Main context in which MAN stem is used	Examples	Translation
Aorist	imperative consecutive	amẓ y-amẓ	"take!" "(and then) he took"
ad + Aorist	non-realized	ay y-amẓ	"that he take"
rad + Aorist	future	ray y-amẓ	"he will take"
ur + Aorist	negated consecutive	ur y-amẓ	"(and then) he didn't take"
ad + ur + Aorist	negated imperative	ad ur t-amẓ-t	"don't take!"
ur + rad + Aorist	negated future	ur ray y-amẓ	"he will not take"
Perfective	past action state (including resultant state)	y-umẓ i-rɣa	"he took" "it was hot, it is hot"
ur + Perfective Negative	negated past action negated state	ur y-umiẓ ur i-rɣi	"he did not take" "it was not hot, it is not hot"
Imperfective	habitual/iterative imperative	tt-amẓ	"always take!"
ad + Imperfective	habitual/iterative imperative	at tt-amẓ-t (Note: Imperfective 2sg. t-tt-amẓ-t is usually realized as tt-amẓ-t.)	"you must always take"
ad + ur + Imperfective	negated habitual/iterative imperative	ad ur tt-amẓ-t	"you should never take"
ar + Imperfective	simultaneous action (progressive) habitual, iterative, durative	ar i-tt-amẓ	"he is taking, he always takes"
ur + ar + Imperfective	negated simultaneous action negated habitual, iterative, durative	ur a y-tt-amẓ, ur aɣ i-tt-amẓ (Note: The imperfective preverbal particle ar changes to a or aɣ (depending on the dialect) after the negation.)	"he is not taking, he never takes"

==== Stative verbs ====
Shilha has around twenty stative verbs which are still recognizable as a separate type of verb on the basis of their MAN stem paradigms. In earlier stages of the language, these verbs had their own separate set of PNG markers, which are sporadically found in premodern manuscripts:

iḍ ɣzzif "the night, it is long" (cf. modern iḍ i-ɣzzif)
rẓag-t isafarn "medicines are bitter" (cf. modern rẓag-n isafarn)

In the modern language, these verbs take the regular PNG markers. Only the original singular relative form without prefix y- may still be encountered, for example adrar mqqur-n or adrar i-mqqur-n (mountain which.is.big) "big mountain". Stative verbs do not have a separate Perfective negative form. The table shows a selection of stative verbs.

	Aorist	Perfective	Imperfective
"be few"	idrus	drus	tt-idrus
"be many"	igut	ggut	tt-igut
"be small, young"	imẓiy	mẓẓiy	tt-imẓiy
"be big, old"	imɣur	mqqur	tt-imɣur
"be yellow"	iwriɣ	wraɣ	tt-iwriɣ
"be red"	izwiɣ	zgg°aɣ	tt-izwiɣ

==== Verbal deictic clitics ====
There are two deictic clitics which are used with verbs to indicate movement toward or away from the point of reference: centripetal d "hither" and centrifugal nn "thither":

ur issin man ass d wrrin
not he.knew which EL-day hither they-return
"he knew not on which day they would return (toward him)"

{nɣiɣ awn} babatun luḥɣ nn ixf nns ɣ wanu
I.killed father-your I.threw tither EL-head of.him in EA-waterhole
"I killed your father and threw his head (away from me) into a waterhole"

The use of these clitics is compulsory (idiomatic) with certain verbs. For example, the verb ack "come" almost always goes with the centripetal particle, and af "find" with the centrifugal clitic:

yucka d darsn yan urqqas zɣ Ɛli Umḥawc
he.came hither {} one EA-messenger from Ali Oumhaouch
"a messenger came to their place from Ali Oumhaouch"

igg°z s wanu yaf nn ixf n izimmr
he.descended to EA-waterhole he.finds tither EL-head of EA-ram
"he descended into the waterhole and found the head of a ram"

When the verbal deictic clitics occur after an object pronoun, they change to id and inn:

iga tn id ɣ yan uqqrab
he.put them hither in one EA-pouch
"he put them in a pouch"

ar tn inn nttgga ɣ txibit
{} them tither we.are.putting in EA-jar
"we usually put them in a jar"

=== Possession ===
==== Within a noun phrase ====
A possessive construction within a noun phrase is most frequently expressed as Possessee n Possessor. The preposition n "of" requires a following inflected noun to be in the annexed state. This kind of possessive construction covers a wide range of relationships, including both alienable and inalienable possession, and most of them not involving actual ownership:

anu n Dawd "Daoud's waterhole"
imi n tsraft "the entrance of the grain silo"
tarwa n Brahim "Brahim's children"
ig°dar n idqqi "pots of clay"
imikk n tisnt "a little salt"
atig n usngar "the price of maize"
tiɣ°rdin n imkli "after lunch"
lmdint n Ssnbul "the city of Istanbul"
aɣllay n tafukt "the rising of the sun"
aɣaras n ssk°ila "the road to school"
ddin n Wudayn "the religion of the Jews"
lqqiṣt n Yusf "the story of Joseph"

Many such possessive constructions are compounds, whose meaning cannot be deduced from the ordinary meaning of the nouns:

aɣaras n walim "road of straw: the Milky Way"
imi n wuccn "mouth of jackal: a length measure" (Note: The distance between the outstretched tips of thumb and little finger.)
talat n tilkin "ravine of lice: nape, back of the neck"
tassmi n ifrgan "needle of hedges: kind of bird"

The possessor can itself be a possessee in a following possessive construction:

lmudda n tgldit n Mulay Lḥasan "the era of the reign of Moulay Lahcen"
luqt n warraw n wulli "the time of the giving birth of the sheep and goats"

As a rule, the preposition n assimilates to, or fuses with, a following w, y, l or m: (Note: For the sake of transparency, the preposition "of" is consistently transcribed as n in the examples in this article. Unassimilated realizations occur in deliberate speech.)

awal n w-aɛrab-n → awal w waɛrabn "the language of the Arabs"
a-ḍbib n y-isa-n → aḍbib y yisan "horse-doctor"
luq-t n w-nẓar → luqt unẓar "the season of rain"
a-gllid n y-muslm-n → agllid imuslmn "the king of the Muslims"
addag n litcin → addag l litcin "orange tree"
a-sngar n miṣr → asngar m Miṣr "maize of Egypt"

The possessor can also be expressed with a pronominal possessive complement. This consists of a pronominal suffix added to the preposition, which then takes the shape nn- (see § Pronouns). The form of the 1st singular possessive complement is anomalous: nw after a vowel, and inw after a consonant (or, in some dialects, niw):

agayyu nu "my head"
ifassn inu "my hands"
aḍar niw "my leg"
aqqrab nnk "your (sg.m.) pouch"
lumur nnm "your (sg.f.) affairs"
timlsa nns "his clothes"
rriy nns "her opinion"
aḍu nns "its smell"
adjarn nnɣ "our neighbours"
tawwuri nnun "your (pl.m.) occupation"
timddukkal nnunt "your (pl.f.) friends"
lmɛict nnsn "their (m.) livelihood"
tik°yaḍ nnsnt "their (f.) locks of hair"

==== Within a clause ====
There are two ways to express possession within a clause. The most common way is to use the "exist with" construction:

tlla dars yat txsayt
she.exists with.him one EA-pumpkin
"he has a pumpkin"

ur dari ylli wmya ma nn lssaɣ
not with.me it.exists EA-anything what thither I.wear
"I've got nothing to wear"

The verb ili "exist" (perfective lli/a) is usually omitted, leaving a verbless clause:

darnɣ argan ar inkkr ɣ tagant
with.us EL-argan {} it.is.growing in EA-forest
"we have an argan tree growing in the forest"

is ur dark kra yaḍnin?
question not with.you something other
"don't you have something different?"

Alternatively, the verb ṭṭf, ṭṭaf "hold, possess" can be used:

iṭṭaf yan uɣyul immuddu srs
he.possesses one EA-donkey he.travels with.it
"he has a donkey which he travels with"

nkki wr ṭṭifɣ luraqq inu
I not I.possess papers of.me
"[as for] me, I haven't got my papers"

In addition, there is the verb ili "possess" (perfective li/a), whose use is restricted to (inalienable) part-whole relationships and kinship relationships:

liɣ alln ɛdlnin
I.possess EL-eyes which.are.good
"I have good eyes"

lan sḍis tarwa
they.possess six EA-children
"they have six children"

In al its usages ili can be replaced with ṭṭaf or the "exist with" construction, but not the other way around:

azrg ila yan uskti
EL-hand-mill it.possesses one EA-handle
"a hand-mill has one handle"

ṭṭafɣ snat tg°mma
I.possess two EA-houses
"I have two houses"

==== Possessed nouns ====
These are a subtype of uninflected nouns. As with proper names, gender is not transparently marked on possessed nouns, which take gender agreement according to the natural sex of the referent. Plurals are either suppletive or made with the preposed pluralizer id. Most possessed nouns are consanguinal kinship terms which require a possessive suffix (the table contains a selection).

	Singular	Plural	Remarks
"the mother(s) of"	ma-	id ma-	
"the father(s) of"	baba-	id baba-	
"the daughter(s) of"	ylli-	ysti-	
"the son(s) of"	yiw-, yu-, ywi-	(t-arwa)	the plural is a pl.m. inflected noun "sons, offspring"
"the sister(s) of"	wlt-ma-	yst-ma-	compound, lit. "the daughter(s) of the mother of"
"the brother(s) of"	g°-ma-	ayt-ma-	compound, lit. "the son(s) of the mother of"
"grandmother: the mother of the mother of"	jdda-		Arabic loan
"grandfather: the father of the mother of"	ti-ma-		compound
"grandmother: the mother of the father of"	tabt-ti-		compound
"grandfather: the father of the father of"	jddi-		Arabic loan

These kinship terms cannot occur without pronominal suffix. Example:

ultma-Ø	"my sister"
ultma-k	"your (sg.m.) sister"
ultma-m	"your (sg.f.) sister"
ultma-s	"her sister, his sister"
istma-t-nɣ	"our sisters"
istma-t-un	"your (pl.m.) sisters"
istma-t-unt	"your (pl.f.) sisters"
istma-t-sn	"their (m.) sisters"
istma-t-snt	"their (f.) sisters"

If these nouns are part of an NP-internal possessive construction, possession must be indicated twice:

baba-s n tslit
father-her of EA-bride
"the father of the bride"

yiwi-s n g°ma-Ø
son-his of brother-my
"my brother's son"

illi-s n wasif
daughter-its of EA-river
"the daughter of the river: fever" (compound)

The suffix must also be added when possession is expressed in a clause:

ur iṭṭif abla yat ultma-s
not he.possesses except one sister.his
"he only has one sister"

Some kinship terms are not possessed nouns but inflected nouns which take possessive complements (see examples above).

Another group of possessed nouns require a following noun phrase, occurring only in an NP-internal possessive phrase. A following inflected noun must be in the EA.

	Singular	Plural
"the son(s) of, native(s) of"	w	ayt
"the female native(s) of"	wlt	yst

These four possessed nouns occur as first element in compound kinship terms (see above; w then becomes g° in g°-ma- "the brother of"). They also serve to indicate descent, origin and ethnicity:

Ḥmad u Musa "Ahmed son of Moussa" (name of a famous saint)
u Brayyim "member of the Aït Brayyim ethnic group"
u bṛṛa "native of outside: a foreigner"
u Trudant "a native of Taroudant"
ayt Ugrsif "the natives of Aguercif"
ult Uglu "native woman of Aglou"
ist Tfrawt "the women of Tafraout"

When w is followed by another (phonemic) w the result is gg°:

w Wijjan → Gg°ijjan "native of Ouijjane" (also surname: Gouijjane)
a-rgaz w w-rgaz → argaz gg°rgaz "a man, son of a man: a man of virtue"

Ayt occurs in many Shilha ethnonyms:

Ayt Bubkr "the Sons of Boubker" (Aït Boubker), singular U Bubkr
Ayt Wafqqa "the Sons of Ouafka" (Aït Ouafka), singular w Wafqqa → Gg°afqqa

==== Proprietive and privative elements ====
The proprietive elements masc. bu "he with, he of" and fem. mm "she with, she of" are borrowed from Arabic (original meaning "father of", "mother of"). They are used as formative elements and require a following inflected noun to be in the annexed state. The plural is formed with the pluralizer id:

bu sa yiwaliwn
{he of} seven EA-words
"a liar"

bu tagant
{he of} EA-forest
"wild boar"

bu tbratin
{he with} EA-letters
"postman"

id bu waga
PL {he with} EA-bucket
"French soldiers (wearing a képi)"

In many cases, bu fuses with a following nominal prefix:

bu w-marg → bumarg
{he with} EA-poetry {} {"a poet"}

bu y-g°ra → {Biyg°ra, Big°ra}
{he with} EA-frogs {} {"Biougra" (place-name)}

The feminine mm is encountered less frequently:

mm igrtal
{she with} EA-mats
"prayer room in a mosque"

mm lɣrur
{she with} delusion
"the world, worldly existence"

id mm ifalan
PL {she with} EA-threads
"needles"

The privative elements masc. war "he without" and fem. tar "she without" are made up of a gender prefix (masculine w-, feminine t-) and an element ar which is probably related to the negation wr "not". They do not require the annexed state, and should probably be translated as "who does not have", with the following noun phrase as object:

war acrik
{he without} EL-partner
"God"

id war tawwuri
PL {he without} EL-job
"the unemployed"

tar azal
{she without} EL-daylight
"wide-brimmed hat"

tar laman
{she without} certainty
"the world, worldly existence"

== Lexicon ==
Tashlhiyt, like other Berber languages, has a small number of loanwords from Phoenician-Punic, Hebrew, and Aramaic. There are also Latin loans from the time of the Roman empire, although the region in which Tashlhiyt is spoken was never in the empire's territory.

Most Tashlhiyt loanwords are Arabic in origin. Maarten Kossmann estimates that about 6% of the basic Tashlhiyt lexicon is borrowed from Arabic; Salem Chaker estimates that 25% of the stable lexicon overall is borrowed from Arabic.

Although some nouns denoting typically Islamic concepts such as timzgida "mosque", taẓallit "ritual prayer", uẓum "fasting", which certainly belong to the very oldest layer of Arabic loans, are fully incorporated into Shilha morphology, many equally central Islamic concepts are expressed with unincorporated nouns, for example lislam "Islam", lḥajj "pilgrimage to Mecca", zzka "alms tax". It is possible that during the early stages of islamization such concepts were expressed with native vocabulary or with earlier, non-Arabic loans. One such term which has survived into the modern era is tafaska "ewe for slaughter on the (Islamic) Feast of Immolation", (Note: The Feast of Immolation itself is known in Shilha as lɛid n tfaska "the feast of the sacrificial ewe".) from pascha, (Note: Pronounced in classical times as [paskʰa] or [paska].) the Latinized name of the Jewish festival of Passover (Pesaḥ) or, more specifically, of the paschal lamb (qorbān Pesaḥ) which is sacrificed during the festival. Another example is ibkkaḍan "sins", obsolete in the modern language, but attested in a premodern manuscript text, whose singular abkkaḍu is borrowed from Romance (cf. Spanish pecado, Latin peccātum; modern Shilha uses ddnub "sins", from Arabic).

Tashlhiyt numerals 5 to 9 may be loanwords, although their origin is unclear; they do not seem to originate from Phoenician-Punic or Arabic. Additionally, all Tashlhiyt numerals agree in gender, whereas Arabic numerals do not.

== Secret languages ==
Destaing mentions a secret language (argot) called inman or tadubirt which is spoken by "some people of Souss, in particular the descendants of Sidi Ḥmad u Musa." He quotes an example: is kn tusat inman? "do you speak the secret language?"

Two secret languages used by Shilha women are described by Lahrouchi and Ségéral. They are called tagnawt (cf. Shilha agnaw "deaf-mute person") and taɛjmiyt or taqqjmiyt. They employ various processes, such as reduplication, to disguise the ordinary language.

== Cited works and further reading ==
- Agrour, R. (2012). "A contribution to the study of an itinerant word: Chleuh". Cahiers d'études africaines. 208 (4): i–xliii.
- Amard, P. (1997). Textes berbères des Aït Ouaouzguite. Edités et annotés par Harry Stroomer. Aix-en-Provence: Edisud. ISBN 2-85744-960-7.
- Amarīr, ʿU. (1987). al-Shiʿr al-āmāzīghī al-mansūb ilā Sīdī Ḥammū al-Ṭālib. Casablanca: Maktabat Provence (in Arabic and Shilha).
- Applegate, J.R. (1958). An outline of the structure of Shilḥa. New York: American Council of Learned Societies.
- Aspinion, R. (1953). Apprenons le berbère. Initiation aux dialectes chleuhs. Rabat: Moncho.
- Bellakhdar, J. (1997). La pharmacopée marocaine traditionnelle. N.p.: Ibis Press. ISBN 2-910728-03-X.
- Boogert, N. van den (1989). "Some notes on Maghribi script" (PDF). Manuscripts of the Middle East. 4: 30–43.
- Boogert, N. van den (1997). The Berber literary tradition of the Sous. De Goeje Fund, Vol. XXVII. Leiden: NINO. ISBN 90-6258-971-5.
- Boogert, N. van den (1998). La révélation des énigmes. Lexiques arabo-berbères des xvii^{e} et xviii^{e} siècles. Travaux et documents de l'Irémam, no. 19. Aix-en-Provence: Irémam. ISBN 2-906809-18-7.
- Boogert, N. van den (2000). "Medieval Berber orthography". In Chaker, S.; Zaborski, A. (eds.). Etudes berères et chamito-sémitiques, Mélanges offerts à Karl-G. Prasse. Paris and Louvain: Peeters (pp. 357–377). ISBN 978-90-429-0826-0.
- Boogert, N. van den (2002). "The names of the months in medieval Berber". In Naït-Zerrad, K. (ed.). Articles de linguistique berbère. Mémorial Werner Vycichl. Paris: L'Harmattan (pp. 137–152). ISBN 2747527069.
- Boogert, N. van den & Kossmann, M. (1997). "Les premiers emprunts arabes en berbère" (PDF). Arabica. 44 (2): 317–322. doi:10.1163/1570058972582506. hdl:1887/4151.
- Boukous, A. (1977). Langage et culture populaires au Maroc. Essai de sociolinguistique. Casablanca: Dar El Kitab (the bland title hides a book on Shilha containing, among others, nine narrative texts with translations, pp. 152–289).
- Boumalk, A. (2004). Manuel de conjugaison du tachelhit. Paris: L'Harmattan. ISBN 2747555275.
- Boumalk, A. & Bounfour, A. (2001). Vocabulaire usuel du tachelhit (tachelhit-français). Rabat: Centre Tarik Ibn Zyad. ISBN 9954022899.
- Cid Kaoui, S. (1907). Dictionnaire français-tachelh'it et tamazir't (dialectes berbères du Maroc). Paris: Leroux.
- Colin, G.S. (1993). Le dictionnaire Colin d'arabe dialectal marocain. Vol. 1–8. Edited by Z.I. Sinaceur. Rabat: Al Manahil, Ministère des affaires culturelles. ISBN 9981-832-03-0.
- Dell, F. & Elmedlaoui, M. (1985). "Syllabic consonants and syllabification in Imdlawn Tashlhiyt Berber". Journal of African Languages and Linguistics. 7 (2): 105–130. doi:10.1515/jall.1985.7.2.105. S2CID 29304770.
- Dell, F. & Elmedlaoui, M. (2002). Syllables in Tashlhiyt Berber and in Moroccan Arabic. Dordecht, Boston, London: Kluwer. ISBN 978-1-4020-1077-4.
- Dell, F. & Elmedlaoui, M. (2008). Poetic metre and musical form in Tashelhiyt Berber songs. Köln: Köppe. ISBN 978-3-89645-398-3.
- Destaing, E. (1920). Etude sur la tachelḥît du Soûs. Vocabulaire français-berbère (PDF). Paris: Leroux (reprinted 1938).
- Destaing, E. (1937). Textes arabes en parler des Chleuḥs du Sous (Maroc). Paris: Geuthner.
- Destaing, E. (1940). Textes berbères en parler des Chleuhs du Sous (Maroc). Paris: Geuthner (contains the same texts as Destaing 1937, which see for the translations).
- Dixon, R.M.W. (2010). Basic linguistic theory. Volume 1, Methodology. Oxford: Oxford University Press. ISBN 978-0-19-957106-2.
- Fox, M. & Abu-Talib, M. (1966). A dictionary of Moroccan Arabic. Washington: Georgetown University Press. ISBN 0-87840-007-9.
- Galand, L. (1988). "Le berbère". In D. Cohen (ed.). Les langues dans le monde ancien et moderne. Troisième partie, Les langues chamito-sémitiques. Paris: CNRS (pp. 207–242). ISBN 2-222-04057-4.
- Galand-Pernet, P. (1972). Recueil de poèmes chleuhs. Paris: Klincksieck. ISBN 2-252-01415-6.
- Gg°ijjan, Lḥusin bn Iḥya (2002). Amarg n Faṭima Tabaɛmrant. Rabat: al-Jamʿīyah al-maghribīyah li-l-baḥth wa-l-tabādul al-thaqāfī (in Shilha).
- Ibáñez, E. (1954). Diccionario Español-Baamarani (dialecto Bereber de Ifni). Madrid: Instituto de Estudios Africanos.
- Jordan, A. (1934). Dictionnaire berbère-français (dialectes tašelhait). Rabat: Omnia.
- Jordan, A. (1935). Textes berbères, dialecte tachelhait. Rabat: Omnia.
- Jouad, H. (1983). Les éléments de la versification en berbère marocain, tamazight et tachlhit. Paris: Thèse en vue du Doctorat de 3ème cycle.
- Jouad, H. (1995). Le calcul inconscient de l'improvisation. Poésie berbère. Rythme, nombre et sens. Paris, Louvain: Peeters. ISBN 9789068317503.
- Justinard, L. (1914). Manuel de berbère marocain (dialecte chleuh). Paris: Librairie orientale & américaine.
- Justinard, L. (1954). Un petit royaume berbère: le Tazeroualt. Paris: Librairie orientale & américaine.
- Kossmann, M. (2012). "Berber". In Frajzyngier, Z.; Shay, E. (eds.). The Afroasiatic languages. Cambridge: Cambridge University Press (pp. 18–101). ISBN 978-0-521-86533-3.
- Kossmann, M. (2013). The Arabic influence on Northern Berber. Leiden: Brill. ISBN 978-90-04-25308-7.
- Kossmann, M.G. & Stroomer, H.J. (1997). "Berber phonology". In Kaye, A.S. (ed.). Phonologies of Asia and Africa. Vol. 1. Winona Lake, Indiana: Eisenbrauns (pp. 461–475). ISBN 1-57506-017-5.
- Lahrouchi, Mohamed & Ségéral, Philippe (July 2009). "Morphologie gabaritique et apophonie dans un langage secret féminin (taqjmit) en berbère tachelhit" (PDF). Canadian Journal of Linguistics. 54 (2): 291–316. doi:10.1017/S0008413100001262. ISSN 0008-4131. S2CID 220973309.
- Lahrouchi, Mohamed (2010). "On the Internal Structure of Tashlhiyt Berber Triconsonantal Roots" (PDF). Linguistic Inquiry. 41 (2): 255–288. doi:10.1162/ling.2010.41.2.255. S2CID 45938533.
- Lamzoudi, M. (1999). Guide d'initiation au dialecte berbère Tachelḥit. Casablanca: Najah El Jadida.
- Laoust, E. (1920). Mots et choses berbères. Notes de linguistique et d'ethnography, dialectes du Maroc. Paris: Challamel.
- Laoust, E. (1936). Cours de berbère marocain. Dialectes du Sous du Haut et de l'Anti-Atlas. Deuxième édition revue et corrigée. Paris: Société d'éditions géographiques, maritimes et coloniales (first ed. Paris: Challamel, 1921).
- Mármol Carvajal, L. del (1573). Primera parte de la descripcion general de Affrica. Granada: Rene Rabut.
- El Mountassir, Abdallah (2003). Dictionnaire des verbes tachelhit-français. Paris: L'Harmattan. ISBN 2747535770.
- El Mountassir, Abdallah (2009). Méthode de tachelhit, langue amazighe (berbère) du sud du Maroc. Paris: L'Asiathèque. ISBN 978-2915255843.
- El Mountassir, Abdallah (2017). Metodo di tachelhit : lingua amazigh (berbera) del Sud del Marocco : asselmd n-tchelhit. Di Tolla, Anna Maria. Napoli: Unior. ISBN 978-88-6719-148-2. OCLC 1141568167.
- Peace Corps Morocco (2011). Tashlheet textbook.
- Podeur, J. (1995). Textes berbères des Aït Souab, Anti-Atlas, Maroc. Edités et annotés par N. van den Boogert, M. Scheltus, H. Stroomer. Aix-en-Provence: Edisud. ISBN 2-85744-826-0.
- Ridouane, R. (2008). "Syllables without vowels. Phonetic and phonological evidence from Tashelhiyt Berber". Phonology. 25 (2): 321–359. doi:10.1017/S0952675708001498. S2CID 16558373.
- Roettger, T.B. (2017). Tonal placement in Tashlhiyt. How an intonation system accommodates to adverse phonological environments. Berlin: Language Science Press (open access publication). ISBN 978-3-944675-99-2.
- Roux, A. (2009). La vie berbère par les textes, parlers du sud-ouest marocain (tachelhit). Ethnographic texts re-edited, translated into English by John Cooper. Köln: Köppe. ISBN 978-3-89645-923-7.
- Stricker, B.H. (1960). L'Océan des pleurs. Poème berbère de Muḥammad al-Awzalî. Leyde: E.J. Brill (Shilha text in Arabic script).
- Stroomer, H. (1998). "Dialect differentiation in Tachelhiyt Berber (Morocco)". Actes du 1er Congrès Chamito-Sémitique de Fès. Université Sidi Mohamed Ben Abdellah, Faculté des lettres et des sciences humaines. pp. 37–49. ISBN 998187812X.
- Stroomer, H. (2001a). "A Tashelhiyt Berber tale from the Goundafa region (High Atlas, Morocco)". In Zaborski, A. (ed.). New Data and New Methods in Afroasiatic Linguistics: Robert Hetzron in Memoriam. Wiesbaden: Harrassowitz (pp. 183–193). ISBN 978-3-447-04420-2.
- Stroomer, H., ed. (2001b). Textes berbères des Guedmioua et Goundafa (Haut Atlas, Maroc). Basés sur les documents de F. Corjon, J.-M. Franchi et J. Eugène. Aix-en-Provence: Edisud. ISBN 2-7449-0263-2.
- Stroomer, H. (2001c). An anthology of Tashelhiyt Berber folk tales (South Morocco). Köln: Köppe. ISBN 3-89645-381-5.
- Stroomer, H (2002). Tashelhiyt Berber folktales from Tazerwalt (South Morocco). A linguistic reanalysis of Hans Stumme's Tazerwalt texts with an English translation. Köln: Köppe. ISBN 3-89645-383-1.
- Stroomer, H. (2003). Tashelhiyt Berber texts from the Ayt Brayyim, Lakhsas and Guedmioua region (south Morocco). Köln: Köppe. ISBN 3-89645-384-X.
- Stroomer, H. (2004). Tashelhiyt Berber texts from the Ida u Tanan (south Morocco). Köln: Köppe. ISBN 3-89645-388-2.
- Stroomer, H. (2008). "Three Tashelhiyt Berber texts from the Arsène Roux archives". In Lubitzky, A.; et al. (eds.). Evidence and Counter-Evidence. Essays in Honour of Frederik Kortlandt. Vol. 2. Amsterdam: Rodopi (pp. 389–397). ISBN 978-90-420-2471-7.
- Stroomer, H. (2025). Dictionnaire tachelhit-français. Vol. 1. Brill. ISBN 978-90-04-70049-9.
- Stroomer, H. (2025). Dictionnaire tachelhit-français. Vol. 2. Brill. ISBN 978-90-04-70051-2.
- Stroomer, H. (2025). Dictionnaire tachelhit-français. Vol. 3. Brill. ISBN 978-90-04-70045-1.
- Stroomer, H. (2025). Dictionnaire tachelhit-français. Vol. 4. Brill. ISBN 978-90-04-70047-5.
- Stumme, H. (1894). "Elf Stücke im Šílḥa-Dialekt von Tázĕrwalt". Zeitschrift der Deutschen Morgenländischen Gesellschaft. 48: 381–406.
- Stumme, H. (1895). Märchen der Schlūḥ von Tázerwalt. Leipzig: Hinrichs.
- Stumme, H. (1899). Handbuch des Schilḥischen von Tazerwalt. Leipzig: Hinrichs.
- Stumme, H. (1907). "Mitteilungen eines Shilḥ über seine marokkanische Heimat". Zeitschrift der Deutschen Morgenländischen Gesellschaft. 61: 503–541.

== Various online articles ==
- "Syllable structure as coupled oscillator modes: evidence from Georgian vs. Tashlhiyt Berber" (PDF). (690 KB)
- "Regular and Irregular Imperfective conjugations in Berber languages" (PDF). (140 KB)
- "Laryngeal behavior in voiceless words and sentences: a photoelectroglottographic study" (PDF). (350 KB)
- John Coleman, "Epenthetic vowels in Tashlhiyt Berber" (includes sound samples)
