= Aïn Kassimou =

- Alternative names: Ain el Quassimou

General information
- Location: Marrakesh, Morocco

Design and construction
- Main contractor: Olga Tolstoy

Ain el Quassimou or Aïn Kassimou is a villa in Marrakesh, Morocco. It was originally built in the late 19th century for Leo Tolstoy's relative, Olga Tolstoy. In the 1980s, it was purchased by French sports billionaire Patrick Guerrand-Hermès and redeveloped, and is now part of Royal Polo Club de la Palmeraie.

== Estate ==
The villa sits on 30 acres (12 ha). It was built for Olga Tolstoy and was later bought by Barbara Hutton. Guerrand-Hermès, formerly director of Hermès, created the Aïn Kassimou in the style of a 19th-century Moroccan house. He had, in particular, a passion for the arts and culture of Morocco where he lived for 50 years, and was an avid lover of oriental arts and horses. This estate now exhibits his art collections. The estate includes the Royal Polo Club de la Palmeraie where U.S. Ambassador Frederick Vreeland and his wife built a home in 1980.

== Fittings ==
Hermes developed a collection of fine art to reflect the spirit of the place. He purchased pieces by Orientalist painters as well as painters of everyday life. The works, depicting scenes from Morocco and Algeria, were acquired in London, New York, and Paris. In addition to 176 paintings and other works on paper, the collection included Islamic art, furniture, jewelry, and weapons. The 1953 portrait of Gianni Agnelli with a rose from Marella Agnelli's garden, painted by Richard Avedon, is in the bedroom of the villa. Among the sporting paintings is Horseman with a Sloughi by Henri Émilien Rousseau. Other important pieces include The Going Out of the Pacha (1869) by Alfred Dehodencq; paintings and drawings of Moroccan kasbahs by Edy Legrand; The girl carrying water in the garden of Majorelle by Jacques Majorelle; and The Fountain of Bab el-Oued by Charles-Théodore Frère. Hermes completed this set with ethnic jewelry. There are amber necklaces and silver brooches, and weapons such as swords, daggers, pistols and rifles.

== Grounds ==
Marella Agnelli engaged the architect Bill Willis to build the pool pavilion in the Aïn Kassimou grounds. The gardens were created by the landscape designer Madison Cox. Royal Polo Club de la Palmeraie (Au Royal Polo Club de la Palmeraie) is a polo venue within the grounds.
