= Treaty of Tadla =

1527 treaty between the Wattasids and Saadis

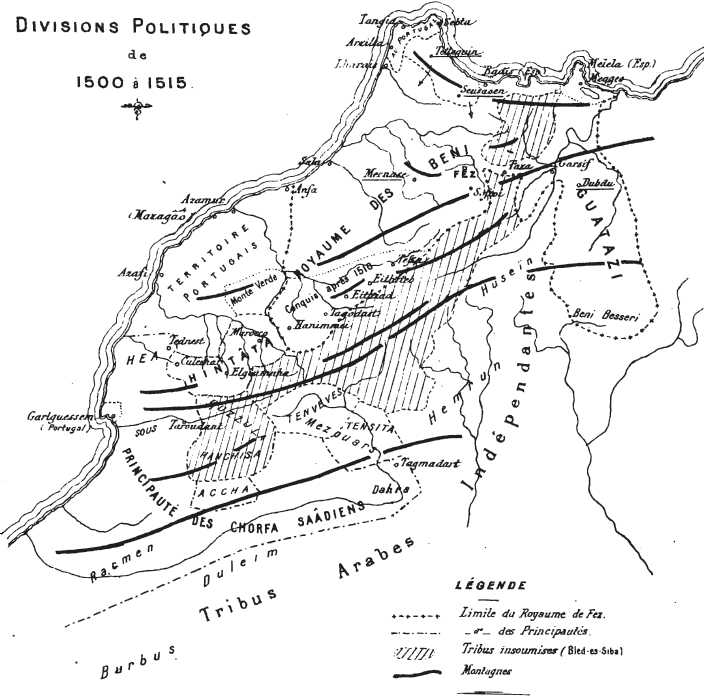
Map of Morocco between 1500 and 1515.

The Treaty of Tadla was a treaty signed in 1527 between the rival Moroccan dynasties of the Wattasids, in the north of the country, and the southern Saadis. The treaty followed an inconclusive military encounter between the two parties at Tadla.

The treaty confirmed to the Saadis the area of Sus and Marrakesh, while the rest of the country, with the capital of Fez, remained to the Wattasids.

== History ==
The internal conflict had weakened the Moroccans in their capability to resist European encroachment, particularly from the Portuguese, but the treaty at last gave some level of stability to the country. The peace allowed the Saadis to challenge the Portuguese possessions in Morocco, and attack the Portuguese in Agadir, leading to the Fall of Agadir in 1541. Following this defeat, the Portuguese soon abandoned their other possessions of Safi and Azemmour, although they managed to retain Mazagan as it was easier to defend.

These victories gave great prestige to the Saadi ruler Mohammed al-Shaykh, who went on to challenge the Wattasids in the north, and finally vanquished them at the Battle of Tadla in 1554.
