= Patrick Guerrand-Hermès =

French-Moroccan sports businessman and billionaire (1932–2024)

Patrick Guerrand-Hermès (25 September 1932 – 13 August 2024) was a French-Moroccan sports businessman and billionaire. He is noted for his involvement with Morocco and redevelopment there, most notably the redevelopment of the Aïn Kassimou in Marrakesh in the 1980s, a villa built for Leo Tolstoy's daughter, Olga. For those achievements in Morocco, he was granted the Moroccan citizenship by king Mohammed VI on 25 April 2019. He was also an art collector, and in 2001 Forbes ranked him as the 387th richest man in the world, with an estimated net worth of $1.3 billion.

== Background ==
Guerrand-Hermès was born on 25 September 1932 in Paris in France. Guerrand-Hermès graduated from Oxford University. His great- great-grandfather, Thierry Hermès, who was French, was founder of the luxury goods firm of Hermès. his father was a sailor, Guerrand-Hermès traveled the world during his childhood.

Guerrand-Hermès died on 13 August 2024, at the age of 91.

== Career ==
Guerrand-Hermès first went to Morocco in 1954 as a cavalryman and was stationed at Marrakesh. Thirty years later, in 1984, he bought Aïn Kassimou as a surprise for his wife Martine and their two sons, Olaf and Mathias.

As a director of Hermès, he developed the firm's silk business. As of 2012 he was retired and spent nine months a year in Morocco pursuing other business interests. He spent the remaining three months in Vineuil-Saint-Firmin, promoting polo at the Chantilly Polo Club. His interest in the sport prompted him to become deeply involved in the development of the polo grounds at Château de Chantilly in the early 1970s. Château de Chantilly held the first thoroughbred horse race on its grounds when Louis XVI was king. The first polo ground in the region was established by the Rothschild family in one of the three farms that belonged to the château in 1920. Fifty years later Guerrand-Hermès and a few of his associates converted the field into a club. It now has ten polo grounds, two of which are suitable for use year-round. The club has about 250 players who participate in many tournaments and some 3,500 horses in training.

The polo team sponsored by Guerrand-Hermès is known as La Palmeraie. He has been president of the Federation of International Polo and was chiefly responsible for organizing the 2004 World Polo Championship at the Domaine de Chantilly Polo club. The perpetual trophy was presented to La Palmeraie by Patrick Guerrand-Hermès, in memory of his son Lionel, a rider who died in 1981 at the age of 18. In honor of Lionel, Patrick established the Lionel Guerrand-Hermès Trophy with the United States Equestrian Team Foundation. His second son Mathias was also a member of the North American squad, who died of a heart attack at the age of 38 in Paris on 28 April 2010.

Guerrand-Hermès also had an interest in the arts and culture of Morocco where he lived for over 50 years, along with oriental arts and horses. He bought the estate, called the Ain el Quassimou or Aïn Kassimou, a villa in Marrakesh, in the 1980s. This estate was re-developed and is now part of the Palmeraie Polo Club. It is used now for events to support charities and foundations throughout Morocco.
