= Henri Émilien Rousseau =

French painter

Henri Émilien Rousseau (17 December 1875, Cairo – 28 March 1933, Aix-en-Provence) was a French painter, graphic artist and illustrator; best known for his Orientialist scenes featuring horses and riders.

== Biography ==
He was the eldest of nine children born to Léon Rousseau (1840-1911), an engineer who participated in the construction of the Suez Canal and, when Henri was three, became the General Director of Public Works for the Khedive, Isma'il Pasha. His family left Cairo after the Anglo-Egyptian War, returned to France and, in 1885, settled in Versailles.

In 1894, he decided to pursue a career in the arts and, with a recommendation from Jean-Léon Gérôme, whom his father had met while in Egypt, he was enrolled at the École nationale supérieure des Beaux-Arts. While there, Gérôme was one of his instructors. After receiving an award at the Salon of 1900, the Académie des Beaux-Arts provided him with a travel grant. He used the grant to visit Belgium, Holland, Spain, Tunis and, eventually, Algeria. The resulting works were presented at the Armory Show in 1913.

He returned to North Africa numerous times between 1920 and 1932; visiting Tunisia, Algeria and, especially, Morocco, which he visited five times.

Displeased with city life in Paris, he moved his family to Aix-en-Provence in 1919, where he joined the Félibrige (an Occitan cultural organization) and became Vice-President of the local art academy in 1932. His work was virtually forgotten after his death, but an "Henri Rousseau Association" was created in 1994. It has held major retrospectives in Toulouse (1997) and Aix (2007). The Musée Granet has a large collection of his works.

== Gallery ==
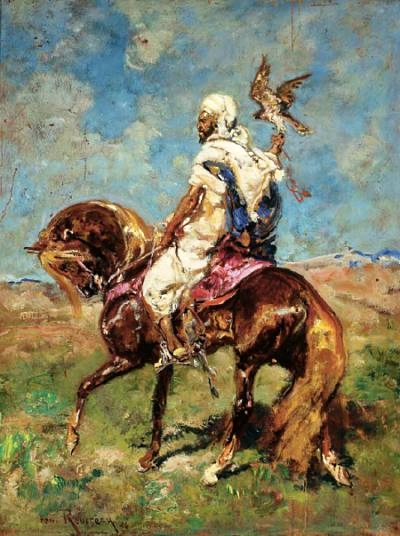
Arab Horseman with a Falcon

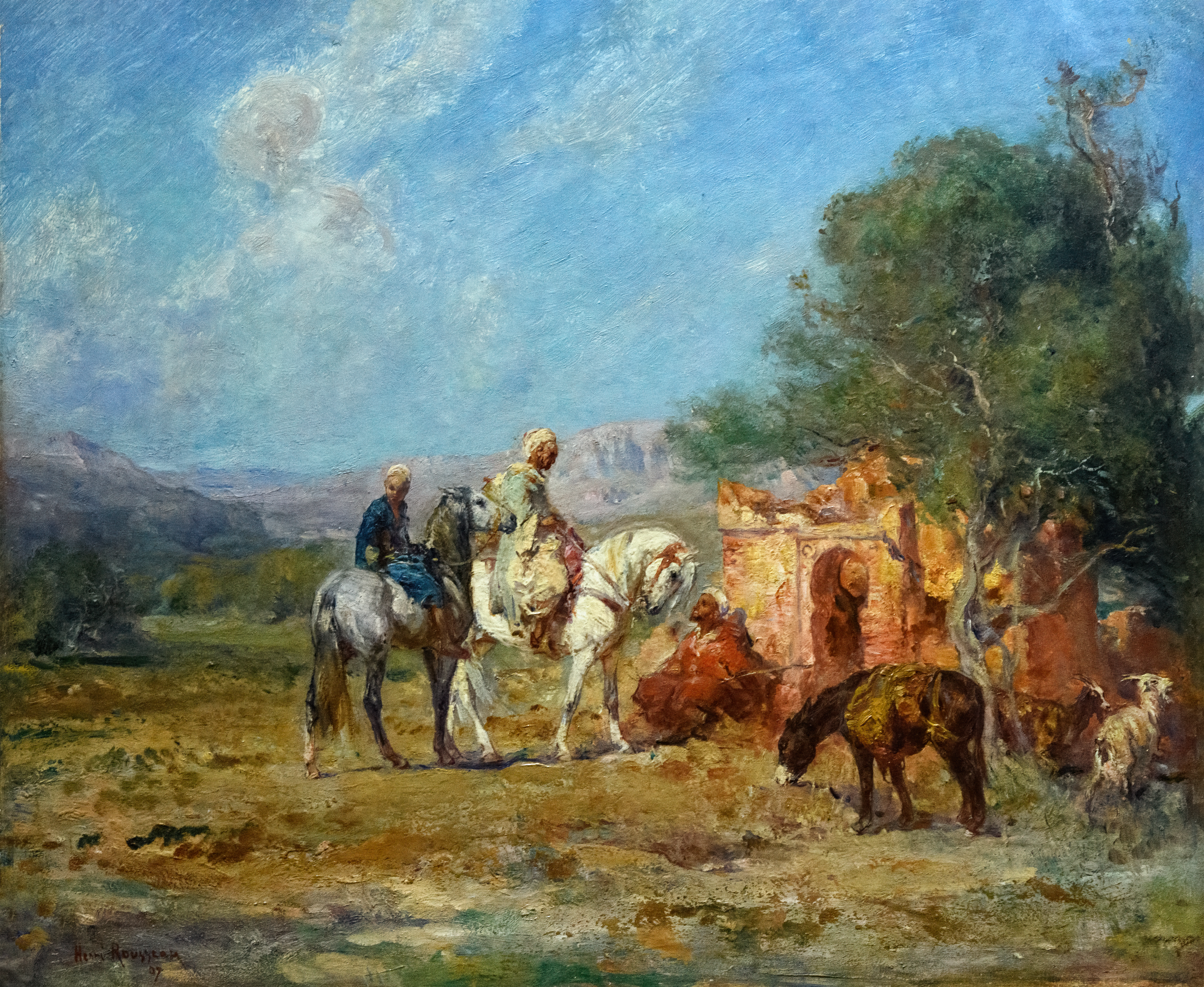
Arab cavaliers near a mausoleum

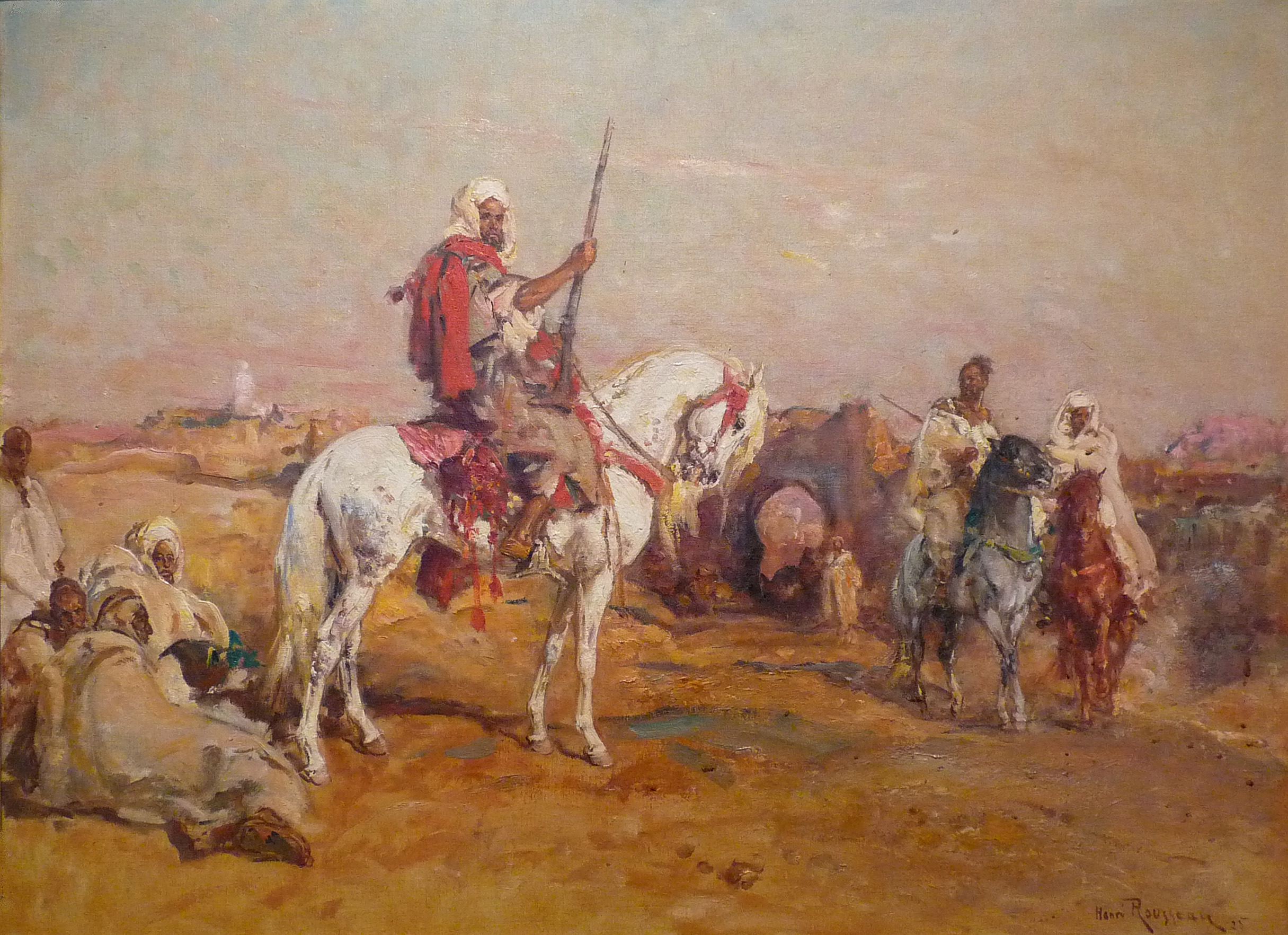
Evening at the Gates of Meknès, 1925
