= 7.5 cm Gebirgskanone L/13 C/80 =

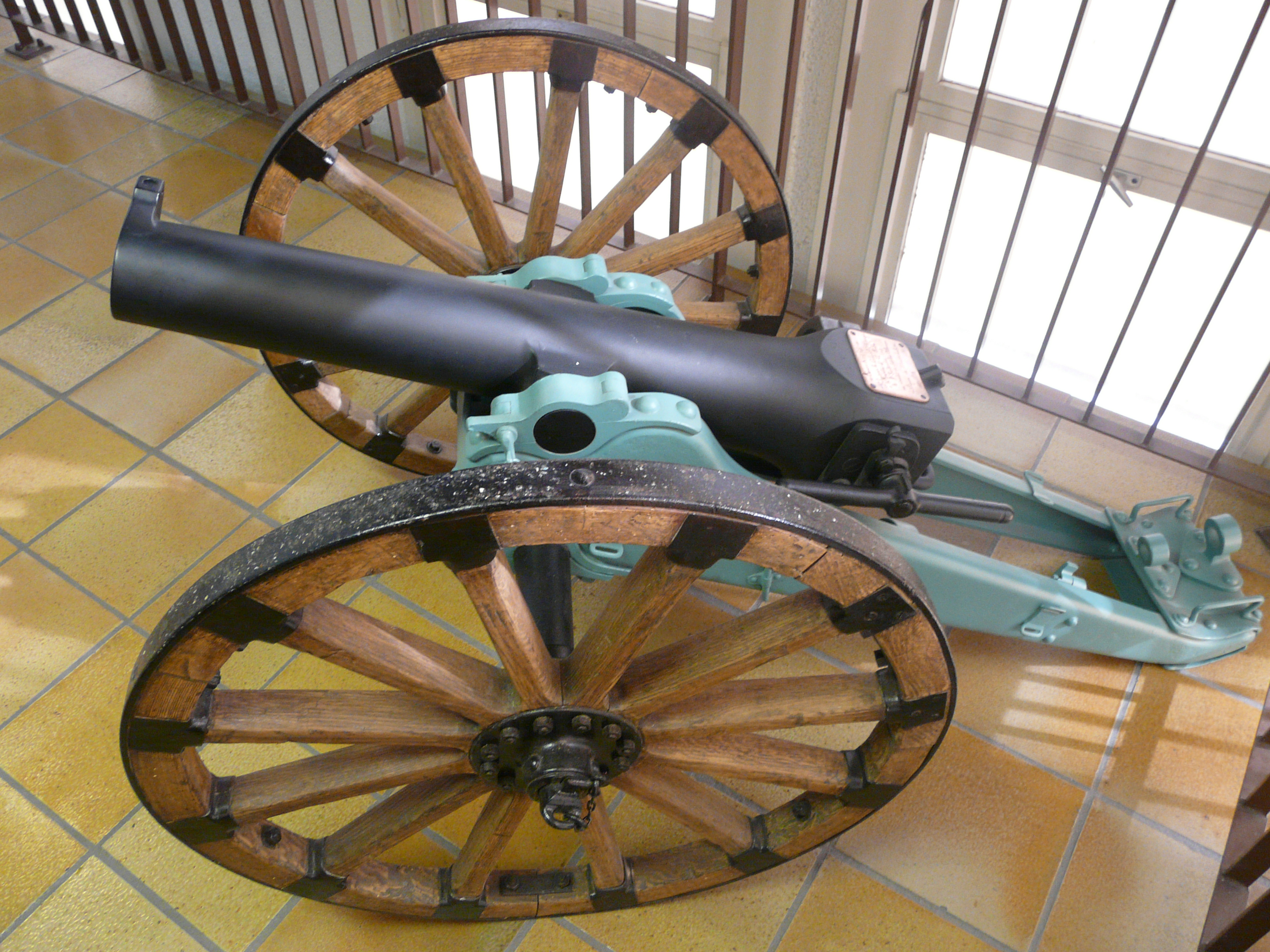
- A 7.5 cm Gebirgskanone L/13 C/80, captured in Morocco at the Musée de La Marine Nationale de Toulon.
- Type: Mountain gun
- Place of origin: German Empire

Service history
- Used by: See users
- Wars: Chilean Civil War of 1891; Herero Wars; Maji Maji Rebellion; French conquest of Morocco; Balkan Wars; World War I

Production history
- Designer: Krupp
- Produced: 1880−1904

Specifications
- Mass: 1880 carriage: 256 kg (564 lb); 1891 carriage: 346 kg (763 lb)
- Length: 1.8 m (5 ft 11 in)
- Barrel length: 97 cm (3 ft 2 in) L/13
- Width: 83 cm (2 ft 9 in)
- Height: 66 cm (2 ft 2 in)
- Shell: Separate loading bagged charge and projectile
- Shell weight: 4.3 kg (9.5 lb)
- Caliber: 75 mm (3 in)
- Breech: Cylindro-prismatic or Interrupted screw
- Recoil: None
- Carriage: Box trail
- Elevation: 1880 carriage: -10° to +20° 1891 carriage: -6° to +23°
- Traverse: None
- Muzzle velocity: 300 m/s (980 ft/s)
- Effective firing range: 2 km (1.2 mi)
- Maximum firing range: 3.9 km (2.4 mi)

The 7.5 cm Gebirgskanone L/13 C/80 was a mountain gun used by several countries during the late 1800s and early 1900s. Germany and the Ottoman Empire also used them during World War I.

== Background ==
During the late 1800s, Krupp became a major arms supplier and one of their better-selling product lines was mountain guns and Krupp sold 688 mountain guns to its customers before World War I. Many of its customers had mountainous borders which were sometimes ill-defined and often were in dispute.

The problem that Krupp's engineers had to solve was there was often a lack of roads and rail lines in mountainous regions and only narrow rocky footpaths existed. The field artillery of the time was designed to be towed by horse teams over gravel roads and then manhandled into firing position. Which was hard enough to do on flat muddy ground but became even more difficult when there was a lack of roads. Traditional field artillery could usually be broken down into separate wagon loads with the barrel on one wagon towed by a horse team while a second horse team towed the carriage. However, there was the issue of the gun crew being unable to reassemble the guns due to a lack of oxygen, cold temperatures, and weighed down with thick clothing.

What was needed was a gun that was light and could be broken down into multiple loads for transport by the gun crew and pack animals. Horses could carry more weight but were large and not always sure-footed. Mules were smaller, sure-footed, but were stubborn and carried less weight. After experimentation it was found that if a gun could be broken down into multiple loads a mule was capable of carrying a 100 kg (220 lb) load and the gun crews were able to reassemble and manhandle the guns into position.

However, the trade-off was mountain guns didn't stand up well to being towed when assembled due to their jointed designs. Also to keep weight down the guns were often small caliber with reduced propellant loads to reduce recoil and lacked range because their barrels were short to keep them light and portable.

== Design ==
The 7.5 cm Gebirgskanone L/13 C/80 was a breech-loaded mountain gun made of steel with a box trail carriage built from bolted steel plates, with two wooden-spoked steel-rimmed wheels. For transport, the gun could be dismantled into multiple mule loads or towed by a mule when assembled. There was no recoil mechanism, no gun shield, no traversing mechanism, and elevation was controlled by a jackscrew beneath the breech. Since it had limited elevation -10° to +20° it was a direct fire weapon meant to fire on troops in the open and the most common shell types were common, canister and shrapnel. In 1891 a new heavier carriage was introduced which increased the angle of elevation to +23° which together with the switch from black powder to smokeless powder increased range and muzzle velocity. The heavier carriage improved towability as well as withstanding the greater recoil of new propellants.

The breech system differed depending on the customer but the projectiles were the same used by the Krupp 8 cm Kanone C/80 field gun. Argentina used a Maxim-Nordenfelt interrupted screw breech for their guns that used separate-loading bagged charges and projectiles. The projectile was loaded first then followed by bagged charges. While Germany, Chile, and the Ottoman Empire used a cylindro-prismatic breech that was a predecessor of Krupp's horizontal sliding-block. The cylindro-prismatic breech used separate-loading cased charges and projectiles. Bagged charges were first placed in a brass cartridge case and assembled with the projectile and then placed in the breech. The difference between the two was the interrupted screw breech provided the obturation to seal the breech while the cylindro-prismatic breech used the cartridge case to seal the breech.

== Users ==
- Argentina
- Bulgaria − it's likely that both Bulgaria and the Ottoman Empire used L/13 C/80 mountain guns during the Balkan Wars and World War I.
- Chile − L/13 C/80 mountain guns were used by Congressist Junta at the Battle of Placilla during the Chilean Civil War of 1891.
- German Empire − before World War I Germany lacked dedicated mountain artillery units despite Krupp and Rheinmetall producing guns for export. The exception was Germany's Schutztruppe in their African Colonies who found mountain guns useful because of their ability to be broken down into pack loads due to a lack of roads. They were likely used during the Herero Wars, Maji Maji Rebellion, and in the African theater of World War I.
- Ottoman Empire − in addition to using L/13 C/80 mountain guns during the Balkan Wars the Ottoman Empire may have used them during the Italo-Turkish War. The Ottoman Empire also used them during the Sinai and Palestine campaign in World War I. A captured Ottoman gun is currently on display at the Honourable Artillery Company Museum, London, England.
- Morocco − L/13 C/80 guns were used by the forces of Ahmed al-Hiba during the French conquest of Morocco. The gun on display at the Musée de La Marine Nationale de Toulon was captured by Colonel Charles Mangin on the 7 September 1912 during the Battle of Sidi Bou Othman.

== Gallery ==
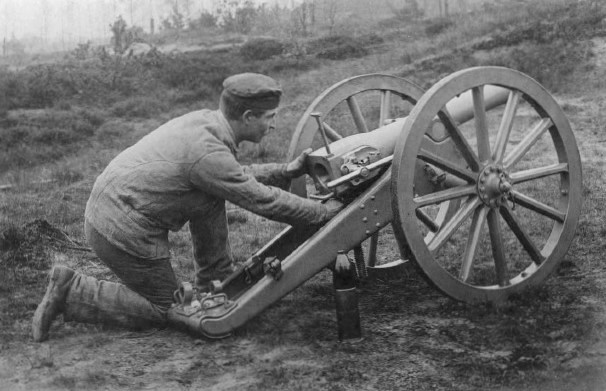
A C/80 in firing position with assembled ammunition.

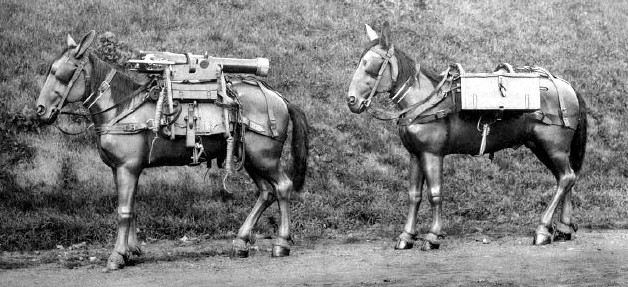
C/80 barrel and ammunition.

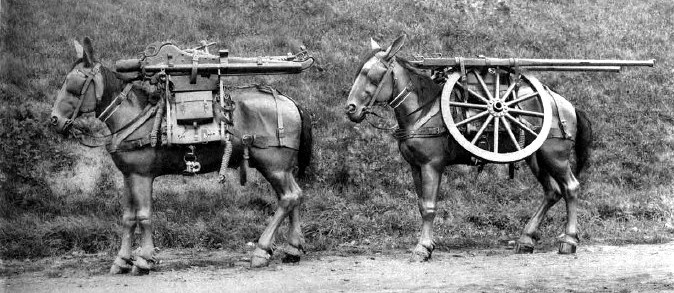
C/80 carriage and wheels.

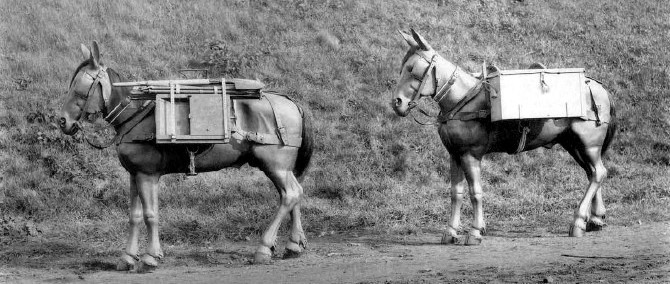
Tools and ammunition.

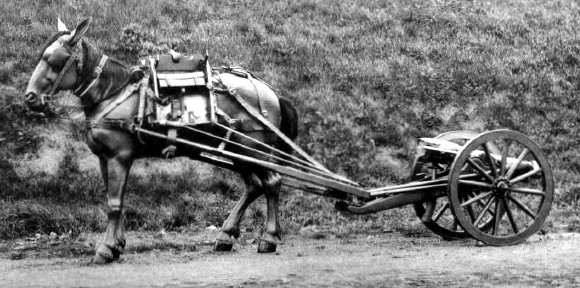
An assembled C/80 being towed.

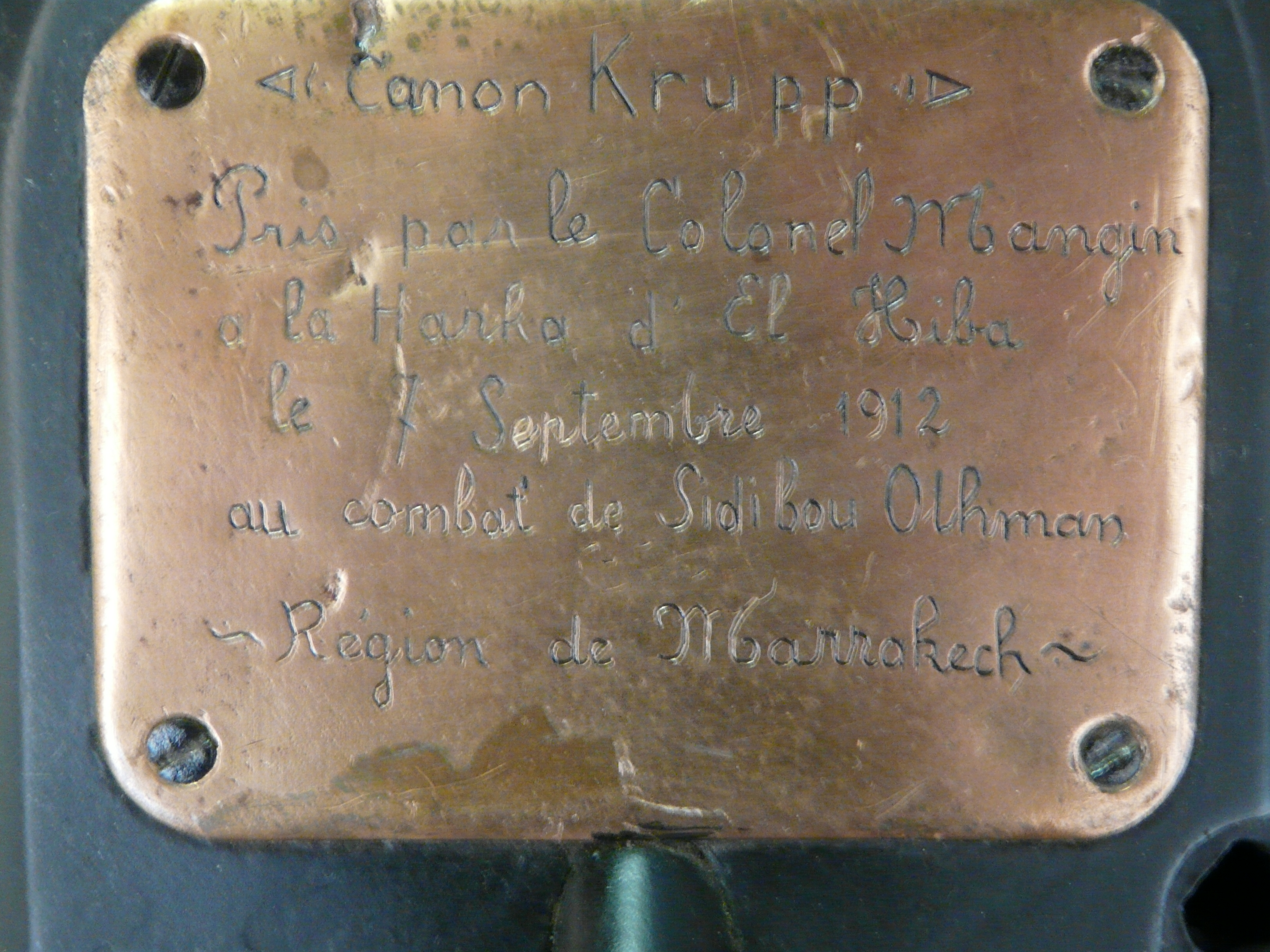
The placard of the captured Moroccan gun.

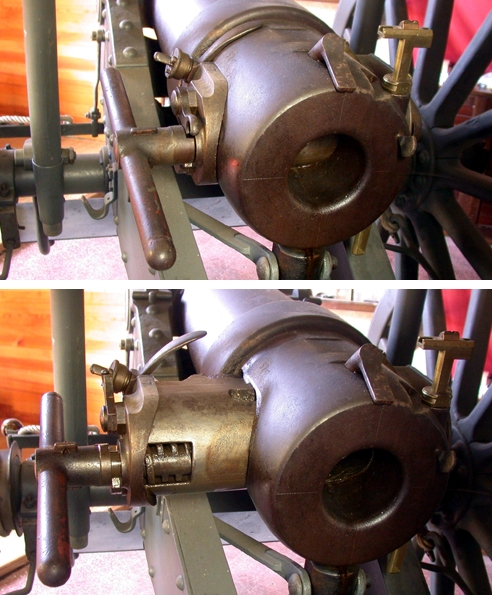
The cylindro-prismatic breech of an early Krupp gun.

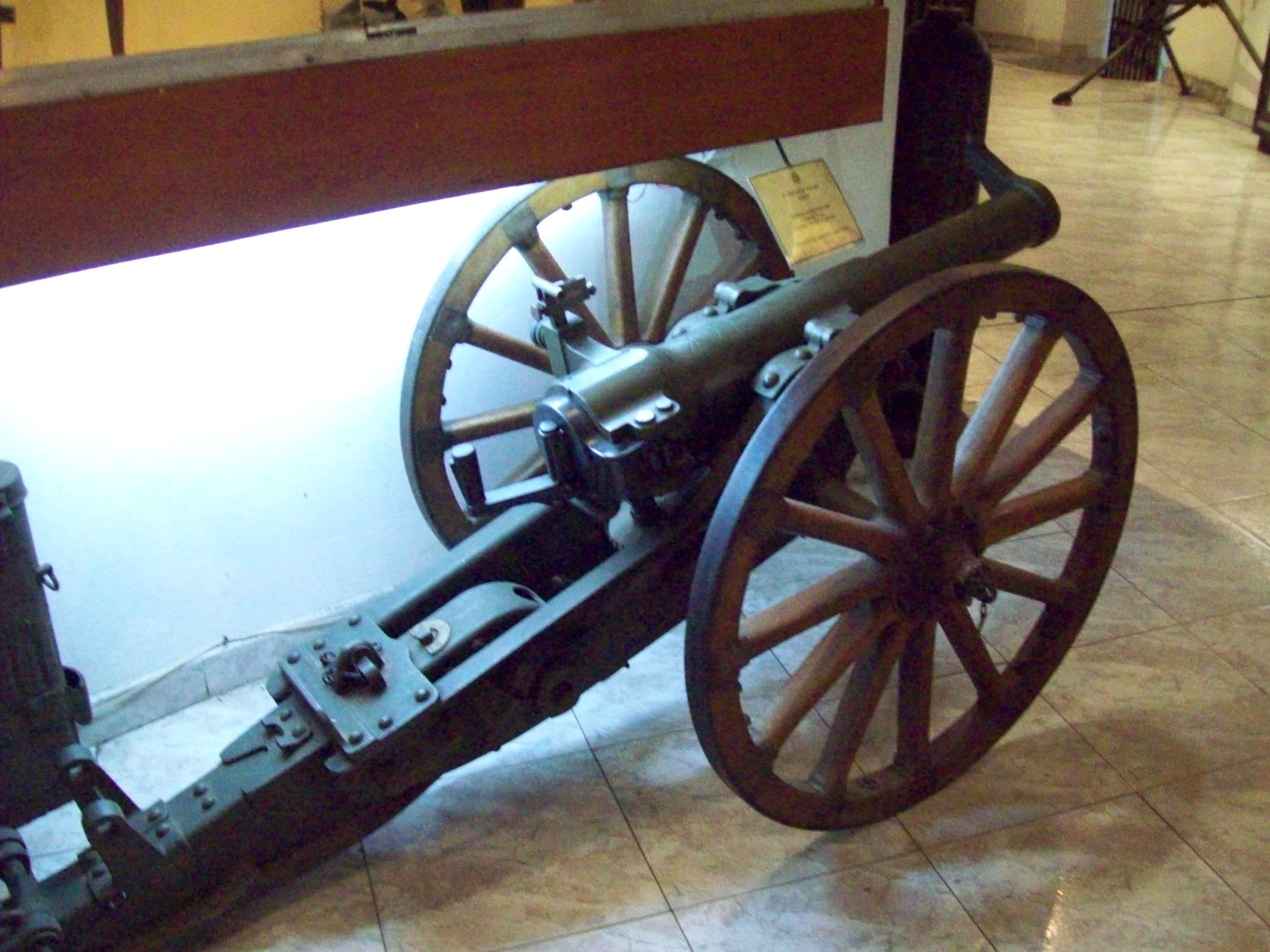
A C/80 at Museo de Armas, Buenos Aires, Argentina. Note the screw breech.

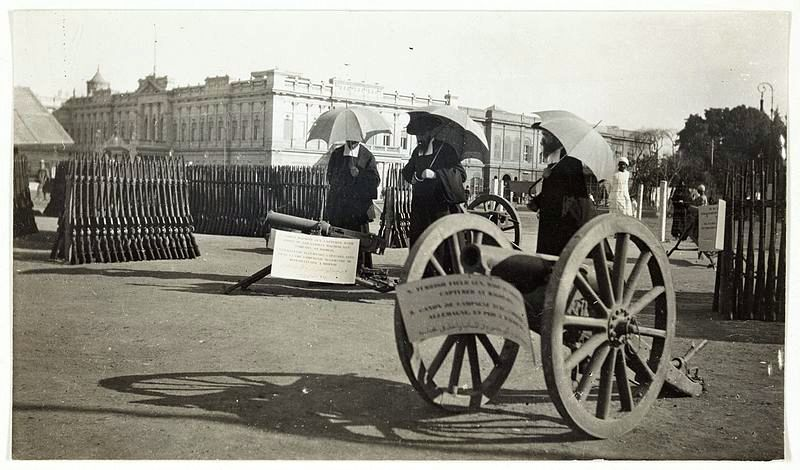
An Ottoman gun captured at Beersheba by the 7th Light Horse Regiment in World War I.

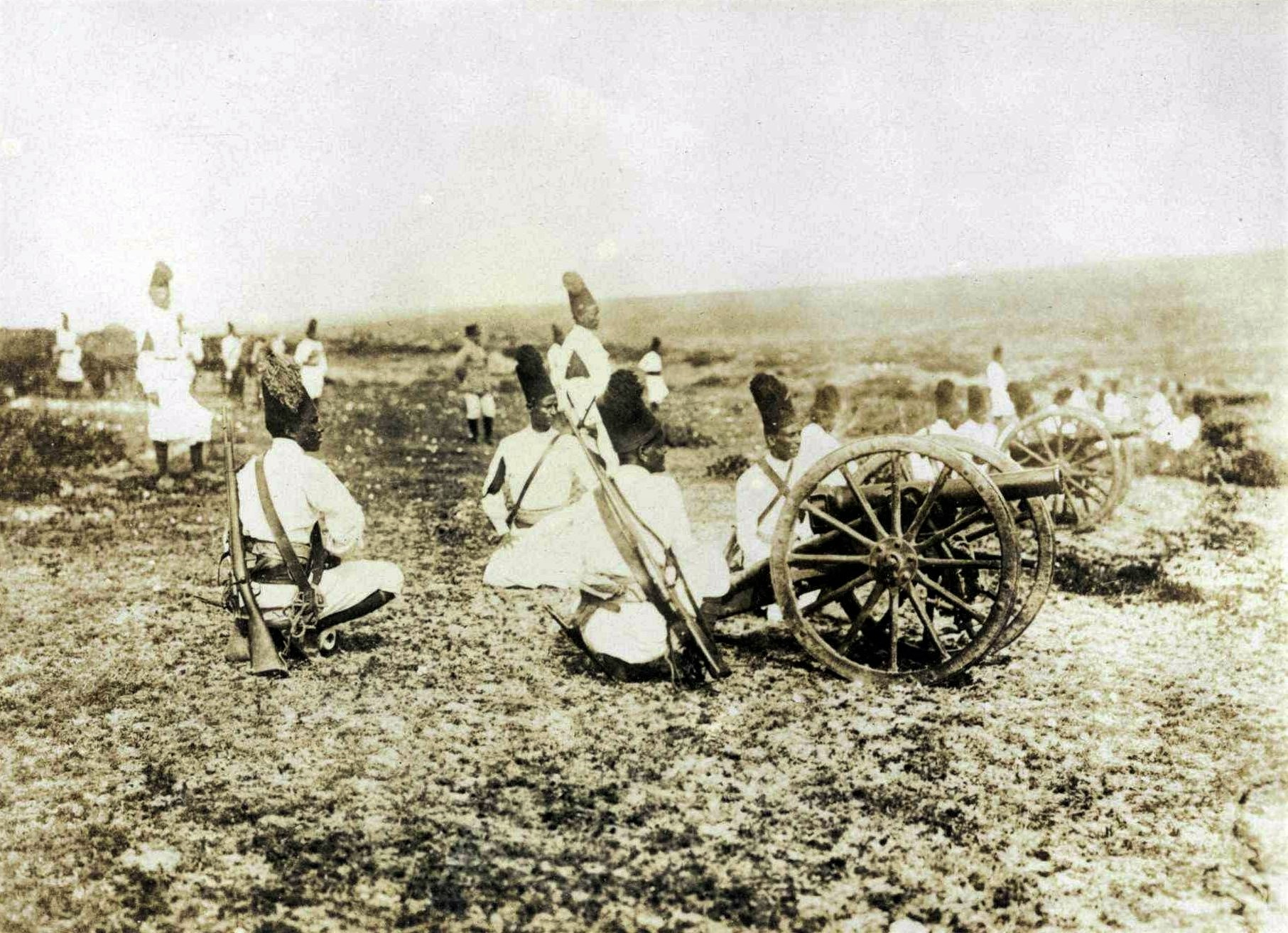
German Askari colonial troops with a mountain gun.
