= Battle of Sidi Bou Othman =

1912 battle of the French Conquest of Morocco

- Part of the French conquest of Morocco
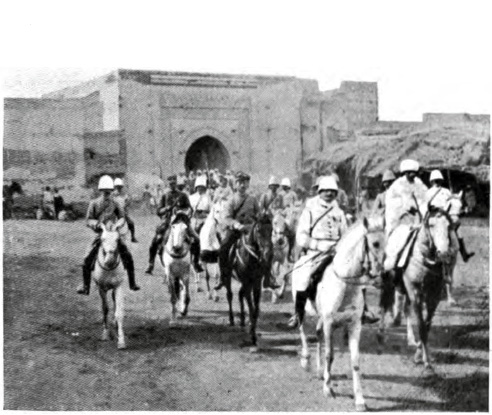
- Charles Mangin enters Marrakesh, 9 September 1912.
Date	6 September 1912
Location	Sidi Bou Othman, near Marrakesh, Morocco 31.9033°N 7.94222°W
Result	French victory: Capture of Marrakesh

Belligerents
France; Supported by: El Glaoui brothers	Hibists

Commanders and leaders
Charles Mangin	Ahmed al-Hiba; Merebbi Rebbu

Strength
5,000	10,000

Casualties and losses
4 dead 23 wounded	2,000 dead >2,000 wounded
- Location within Morocco

The Battle of Sidi Bou Othman (6 September 1912) was an important battle fought at Sidi Bou Othman, some 40 kilometers north of Marrakesh, during the French conquest of Morocco. It saw the victory of a French column under Colonel Charles Mangin over the forces of the south Moroccan leader Ahmed al-Hiba in September 1912. As a result of the victory, the French captured the city of Marrakesh and annexed southern Morocco into the French protectorate of Morocco. The conquest was facilitated by the defection of the great qaids of the south, notably the El Glaoui brothers.

== Background ==
French invasion of Morocco began in 1907, with the military occupation of Oujda, following the assassination of the French physician and informant Émile Mauchamp, and Casablanca, following French bombardment and invasion. The French military presence outraged domestic opinion in Morocco, but the new Alawite Sultan Abd al-Hafid of Morocco, facing severe financial difficulties and dependent on French loans, was unable to do much about it. Some tribal leaders took matters into their own hands and attacked the French themselves. Notable among these was the Saharan marabout Ma al-'Aynayn, who had previously led the anti-French resistance in Mauritania. In 1910, al-Aynayn crossed the High Atlas with his veiled, camel-riding Saharan troops (nicknamed the "Blue Men"), aiming to liberate Casablanca, but he was defeated by the French at Tadla on 23 June 1910, and forced to retreat to Tiznit (in the Anti-Atlas foothills of the Souss valley), where he died shortly after.

In early 1911, there was a massive uprising in Fez against Abd al-Hafid which was put down by French troops. The entry of French troops into the Moroccan capital alarmed other European powers and led to a brief international crisis (see Agadir Crisis). To write out other European powers permanently, France hurriedly concluded the Treaty of Fez in March 1912, by which Abd al-Hafid effectively surrendered his sovereignty, allowing France to establish a protectorate over Morocco. General Hubert Lyautey was appointed the first French resident-general.

The event provoked uprisings across northern Morocco. Tribal armies in the north promptly besieged the French colonial forces, strung out on the line between Casablanca and Fez. Changing course, the sultan Abd al-Hafid himself entered into contact with the rebels, prompting Lyautey to force him to abdicate the throne on 11 August 1912 in favor of his more pliable brother, Yusuf.

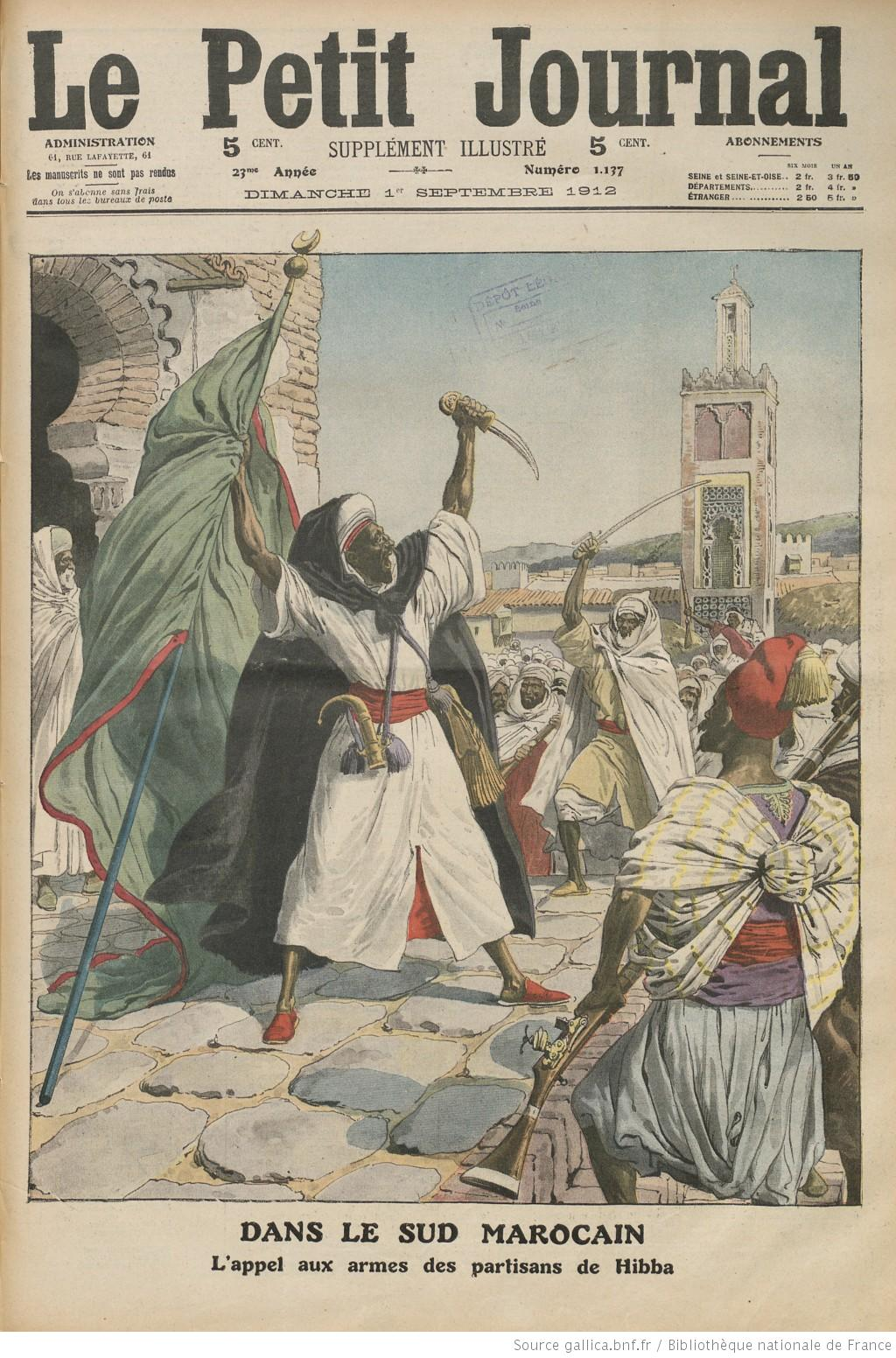
Call to arms by al-Hiba's partisans, as illustrated by the French peridiocal Le Petit Journal, 1 September 1912

In the south, Moroccan resistance rallied around Ahmed al-Hiba, the son of the late Ma al-Aynayn, who declared a jihad to expel the French from Morocco. Quickly gaining control of the Souss valley, in July, 1912, Ahmed al-Hiba led his Saharan troops ("Blue Men") and his growing army of Moroccan followers over the High Atlas. The Hibists took possession of Marrakesh on 15 August 1912. Declaring the throne vacant with Abd al-Hafid's abdication, Ahmed al-Hiba was recognized by the ulama of Marrakesh as the new sultan of Morocco ("The Blue Sultan").

The rise of the new sultan in the south alarmed Lyautey, as al-Hiba undermined the legitimacy of the puppet-sultan Yusuf, and consequently threatened the French hold on the north. Lyautey rushed French diplomatic and military officials to try to persuade the great lords (qaids) of the south to prevent Marrakesh from falling in the hands of the Hibists. The great qaids — notably the El Glaoui brothers, Madani and Thami, and their fellow-qaids al-Mtouggi and al-Gundafi of the High Atlas — had little love for al-Hiba, as he openly denounced the whole semi-feudal system they represented and threatened their power and authority. But the Hibist movement had swept up the rank-and-file of their tribes, and the qaids were unable or reluctant to oppose al-Hiba, they had to play along or risk being deposed themselves. Eight French officials trapped in Marrakesh were taken hostage by al-Hiba, who hoped to use them as bargaining chips in negotiations for the recognition of his sultanate and insurance against a French attack on Marrakesh. Nonetheless, some qaids, notably Thami El Glaoui (who secretly retained one of the French hostages with him), continued clandestine communication with Lyautey, and kept him up to date on the situation in Marrakesh.

== Mangin's column ==
Deeming it the priority threat to the French protectorate, Lyautey peeled away French colonial soldiers from their hard-pressed positions in the north to assemble a new column to dislodge al-Hiba from Marrakesh. Lyautey placed the column under the command of Colonel Charles Mangin. Mangin's column was composed of six companies of Senegalese tirailleurs, two companies of Algerian tirailleurs, two companies of colonial infantry, a goum of Moroccan auxiliaries, two cavalry squadrons and a mountain artillery battery. They would be later joined by another column under Lieutenant Colonel Joseph, composed of a battalion of zouaves, two companies of Algerian tirailleurs, a squadron of spahis and mobile artillery.

== Initial skirmishes ==
Mangin set out with his column from Casablanca on 14 August 1912 and reached the furthest French station at Machraa Ben Abbou (on the Oum Er-Rbia River), about half-way on the north–south road between Casablanca and Marrakesh. On 15 August, the Mangin column advanced to Skhour Rehamna further south along the same road. Their position was harassed by Arab Rehamna tribesmen from the region, who had recently adhered to the Hibist cause. Lyautey ordered them to stay put there and await reinforcements from Lt.-Col Joseph from Doukkala. In the meantime, Lyautey continued using backchannels to negotiate with al-Hiba for the release of the French hostages.

Al-Hiba dispatched an army to Ouham (west of Skhour), to ambush Joseph's column and prevent their junction. Hearing of this, Mangin launched a quick attack on the Hibist camp on 22 August, breaking it up and forcing them to disperse. The Hibists regrouped and attacked the French camp the next day, but were fended off after a brief skirmish. Reinforced by Joseph, the Mangin column proceeded back towards Skhour, where they were instructed to stay put by Lyautey while negotiations continued. Regional tribesmen continued harassing the French camp at Skhour.

Hearing that a great Hibist army under al-Hiba's brother, Merebbi Rebbo, was assembling to the south of them at Ben Guerir, Mangin, without consulting Lyautey, ordered an offensive. Mangin fell on the Hibist army at Ben Guerir on August 29, but with the terrain unfavorable to them, the Hibists broke off the engagement and retreated back towards Marrakesh. The French column returned to Skhour.

On September 3, Lyautey received missives from Thami El Glaoui, informing him that the situation in Marrakesh had turned decisively against the Hibists. Al-Hiba's puritanical edicts - he famously ordered all unmarried women in Marrakesh to take a husband from among his mujahadeen - had already alienated much of the city's resident population. The timidity and defeats of the Hibist armies in the skirmishes with Mangin now fostered doubts about al-Hiba's military judgment and leadership qualities, and began to disenchant his followers. Even the more fanatical ones who regarded him as a mahdi began feeling uneasy. Al-Hiba's mystical promise that "French bullets would turn into water and French shells into watermelons" had been tested and found wanting. As al-Hiba's popularity was weakening, the qaids began feeling bolder. Should the French march on Marrakesh, El Glaoui promised, the qaids were prepared to pounce inside the city and secure the French hostages themselves.

Digesting all this information, on the evening of 3 September, Lyautey dispatched a message by wireless to Mangin, famously stating only: "Allez-y carrément" ("Go straight ahead").

== Battle ==
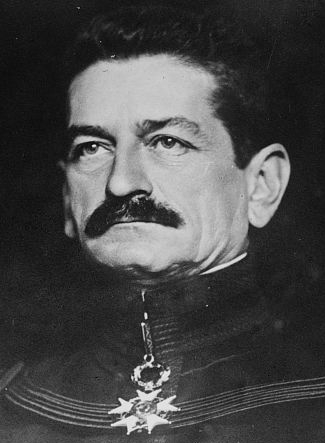
Colonel Charles Mangin who led the French forces in the Battle of Sidi Bou Othman

On the morning of September 5, 1912, Mangin set out with his column of five-thousand men - six battalions, two goums, two-and-a-half cavalry squadrons and three artillery batteries. They carried twelve 75mm field guns, eight machine guns and 1,200 Gras rifles. The troops were organized on their march into a "fighting square", followed by a convoy square of 1,500 mules and 2,000 camels.

On the dawn of September 6, the French column reached Sidi Bou Othman, some 40 kilometers north of Marrakesh, where the Hibist army was already gathered, blocking the entrance to a key valley on the road to Marrakesh. The Hibist force, led by al-Hiba's brother, had around ten thousand men, with 1,000 muzzle-loading muskets, the rest poorly armed, many merely with sticks and stones, stretched out on a two-and-half mile front. They carried with them two Krupp cannons and some eight hundred rounds, under the command of a Spanish renegade.

The French army was running out of water by this time, and another scorching hot day was ahead, so there was no question of avoiding or delaying engagement. Mangin maintained his battle square, placing his guns in the center of the infantry formations, offering a mere half-mile front, and began his march against the Hibist line. The Hibists maintained formation as they marched forth to meet him, their longer line enveloping the advancing square like a crescent. The Hibists held their fire until around 1,400 meters. Mangin waited until they were around 800 meters distant to halt his square and open fire. The cascading salvoes of French close-range artillery, machine guns and rifles devastated the ranks of the Hibist army. Nonetheless, the Hibists held formation and continued their enveloping approach. The French square held ground, reloading and firing relentlessly, decimating the Hibist ranks as they approached.

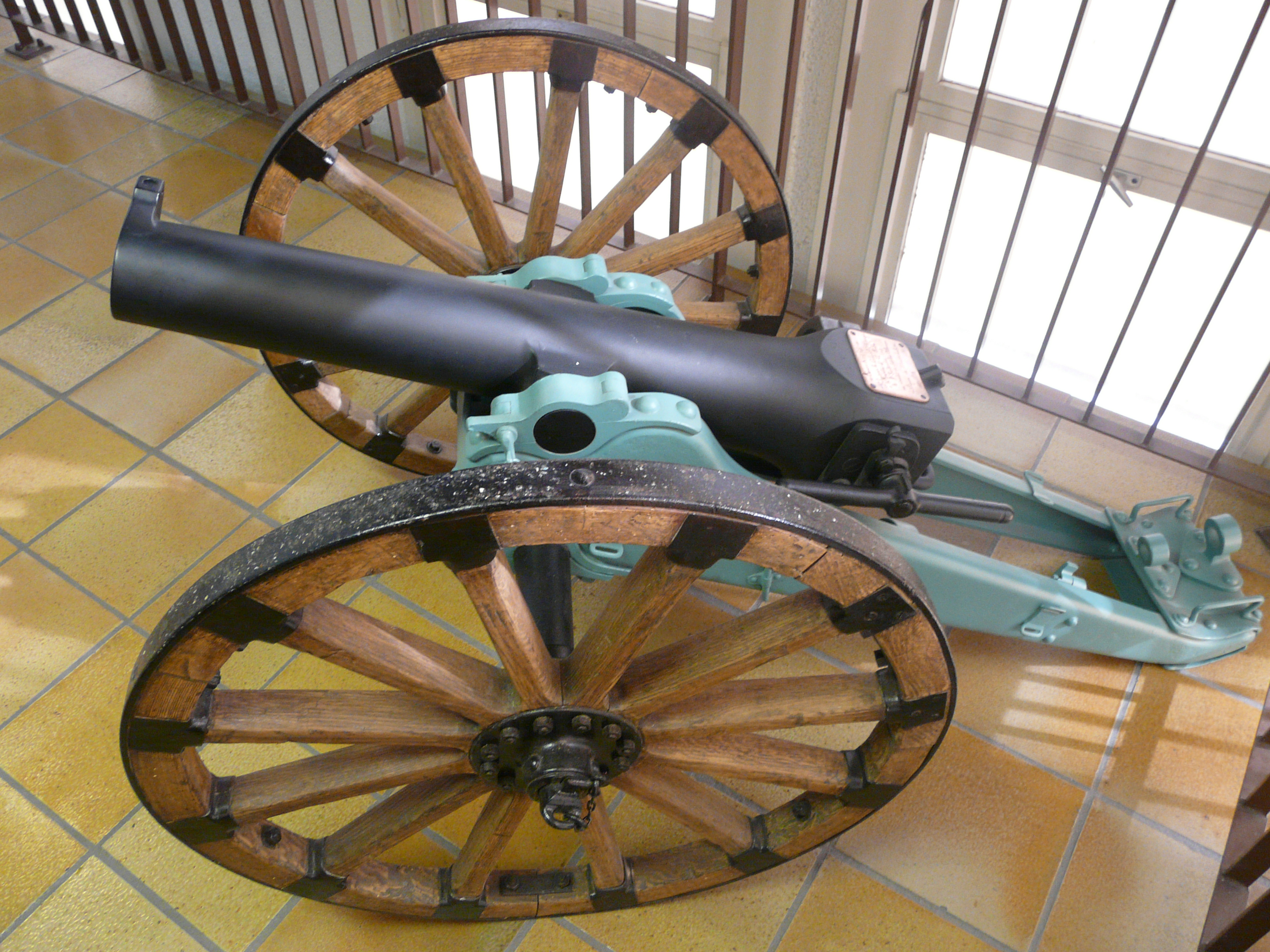
A 7.5 cm Gebirgskanone L/13 C/80, captured in Morocco at the Musée de La Marine Nationale de Toulon.

The concentration of continuous French firepower, particularly the artillery and machine guns, on the approaching, tight human mass caused horrific casualties in the Hibist ranks. The Hibists' Krupp guns, in inexperienced hands, did little damage in response, their aim being off. The Hibist charges fell consistently short of the French square, the attackers never getting closer than a hundred meters before being mowed down. The French thereby avoided the hand-to-hand engagement in which the Hibists's superior numbers might have tipped the balance.

By nine o'clock, the battle was over. Hibist volley fire began to falter, with the army breaking up in retreat. Mangin sent out his cavalry under Captain Picard to disperse the remainder and sweep through the Hibist camp and cut down survivors. It had been a veritable massacre. The Hibists had suffered two thousand dead and thousands more wounded. Mangin's forces suffered merely four (or two) dead and twenty-three wounded.

The battle of Sidi bou Othman was the first ranged battle fought by the French in North Africa since the Battle of Isly of 1844. The Hibists employed much the same archaic tactics – tight regiments in a firing line, infantry charges, auxiliary cavalry and light cannon – as might be found in an early 19th-century Napoleonic battle. These proved ineffective when confronted by modern French technology. Mangin credited the victory to the judicious application of the superior speed and power of massed artillery and machine guns.

== Aftermath ==
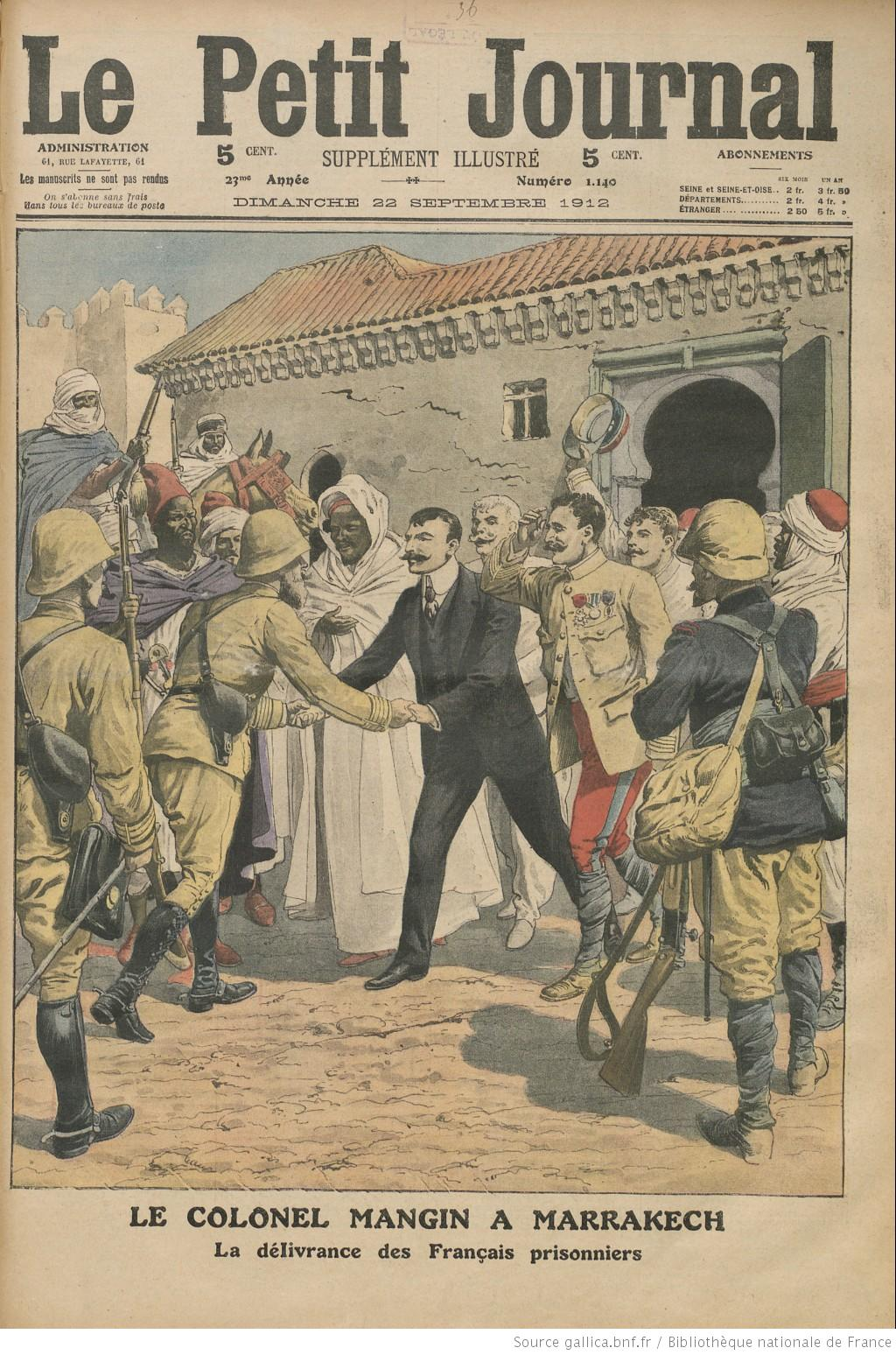
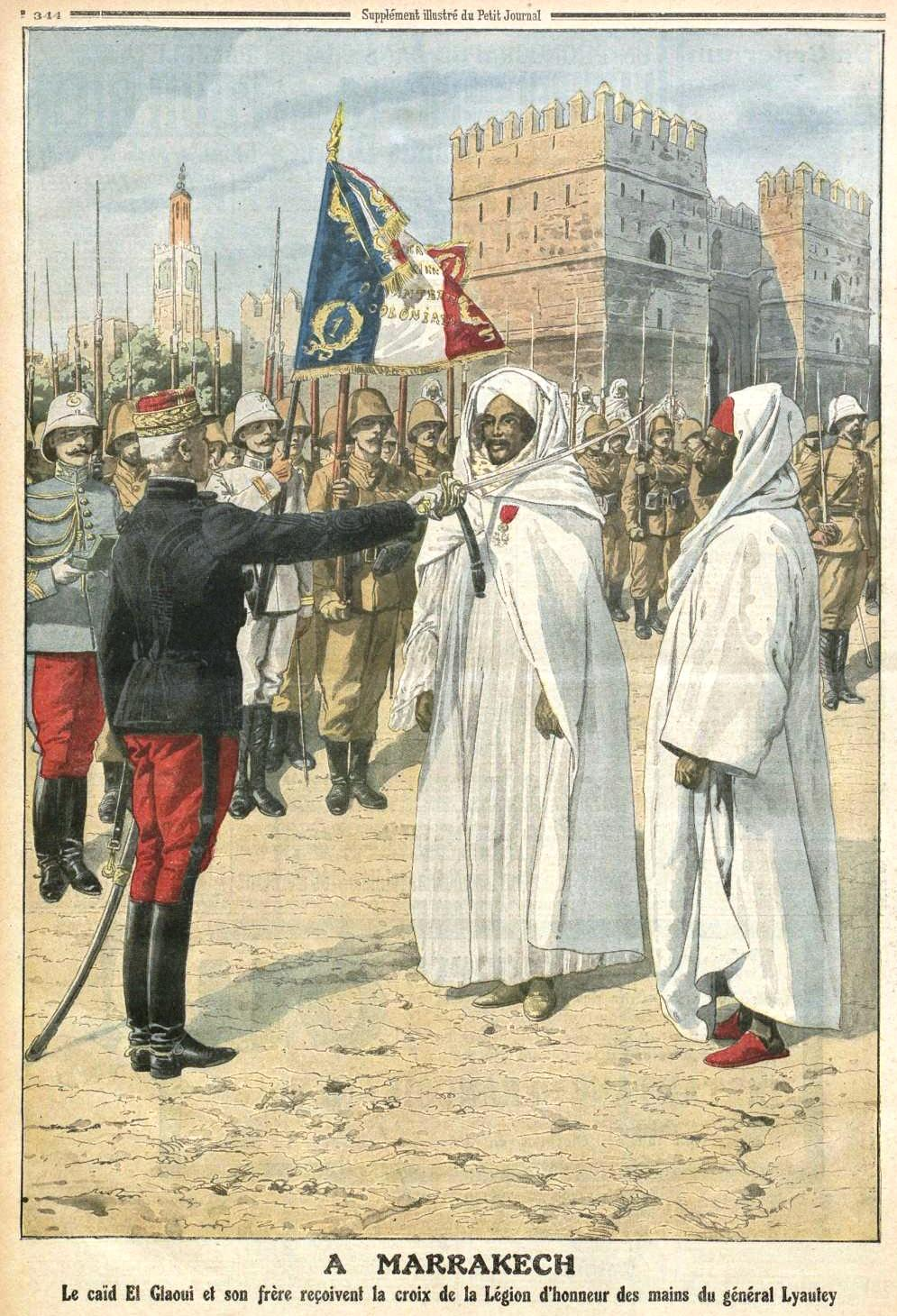
Left: Recovery of the French prisoners in Marrakesh, Right: Hubert Lyautey decorates the El Glaoui brothers, as envisioned by Le Petit Journal, 1912

A few hours after the battle, Mangin assembled a flying column under Lt.Col. Henri Simon to race to Marrakesh (some 105 kilometers away) and break the French hostages out before the Hibists could reorganize. Simon's column was composed of two cavalry squadrons, the goums, and a section of the 75mm guns, in all some 600 horsemen. Avoiding Hibist strongpoints, Simon's column arrived at the Tensift River that same evening, and entered into communication with the qaids inside the city.

At first light, 7 September 1912, on a pre-arranged signal, as Simon's column left the Tensift's banks and approached the city, the qaids pounced. Forces loyal to the qaids Madani and Thami El Glaoui, al-Gundafi, al-Mtouggi and Driss Menou overwhelmed the Hibist garrison posts inside the city. By the time Simon reached the Bab Doukkala gate at 10 o'clock, it was all over. The qaids were in control of Marrakesh, the French hostages were safely in their hands, and al-Hiba himself had fled the city with his remaining supporters.

Mangin arrived with the rest of the army that afternoon, and set up his camp at Gueliz, northwest of the city, where he received the Marrakeshi qaids and their oaths of allegiance to the sultan Yusuf. Two days later, on 9 September 1912, the French army finally entered and took possession of the city of Marrakesh.

Al-Hiba fled to the Souss valley, where his support was still strong. The region around Marrakesh was organized as a military district, initially under Mangin, but given the lack of French troops, Lyautey's policy was to rely on the grand qaids - al-Glawi, al-Mtouggi, al-Goundafi, al-Ayadi, Haida, etc. - to hold the south in their name. Thami El Glaoui was promptly restored to his former position as pasha of Marrakesh and awarded the Legion of Honour by Lyautey, who personally visited Marrakesh in October 1912. While the French troops were reoriented northwards, towards conquering the Tadla plain and the Middle Atlas (see Zaian War), it was the qaids who were placed in charge of putting an end to the Hibists in the Souss.

The qaids proved their worth almost immediately, El Glaoui and al-Goundafi led an invasion of the Souss valley in early 1913, capturing Taroudannt in May and Agadir in June, driving the Hibists up into the mountains. The Hibists, however, would hold out there for much longer. The outbreak of World War I in 1914 deprived the French authorities in Morocco of additional French troops, and many of the officers broken in by the Moroccan campaign would go on to distinguish themselves in the European front. During the war, Germany supplied the Hibists with money, guns and ammunition. Although they were largely confined to the highland peaks and ravines, the Hibists still presented a constant threat to the thin French hold on the southern Moroccan valleys. In 1917, a French column under général de Lamothe attempted to dislodge them from their mountain strongholds, but the resistance proved too fierce. Ahmed al-Hiba died on 23 May 1919, and was buried in Kerdous village. Despite the death of their charismatic leader and the evaporation of German support, the Hibist movement continued under his brother Merebbi Rebbo. The Hibists were only finally reduced in 1934, after a concerted French campaign up the Anti-Atlas. Rebbo fled into exile in the Spanish enclave of Sidi Ifni, dying in 1942.

A monument was erected by the French at the site of the battle of Sidi Bou Othman. It was destroyed after Morocco gained independence in 1956.
