= Sidi Bou Othmane =

Coordinates: 31.9033°N 7.94222°W

- Town
- Interactive map of Sidi Bou Othmane
- Country: Morocco
- Region: Marrakesh-Safi
- Province: Rehamna

Population (2004)
  - Total: 1,732
- Time zone: UTC+0 (GMT)

Sidi Bou Othmane is a town in Rehamna Province, Marrakesh-Safi, Morocco. According to the 2004 census it has a population of 5,066.

The famous Battle of Sidi Bou Othman was fought here on 6 September 1912, between the French colonial forces and the army of Ahmed al-Hiba.
