= Xavier Coppolani =

French colonial leader

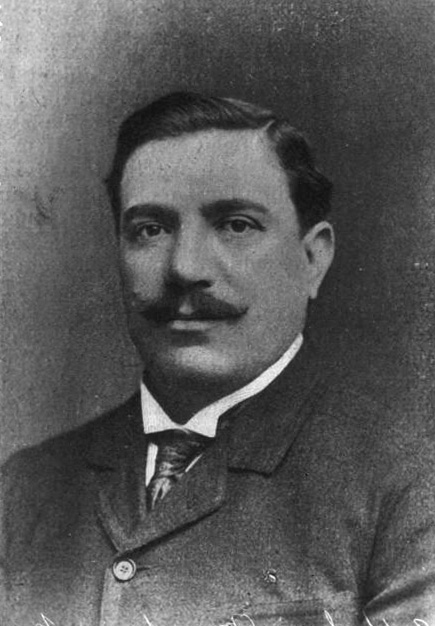
Xavier Coppolani

Xavier Coppolani (2 February 1866 – 12 May 1905) was a French military and colonial administrator, who was instrumental in the colonial occupation and creation of modern-day Mauritania.

== Early life ==
Born in Marignana, in Corsica, his father, Dominique, was considered to be a member of the colon class of French immigrants to French Algeria. While Coppolani was in Algeria, he grew up among local Muslims and learnt Algerian Arabic. He was intrigued by Islamic practices and studied Sufism.

== Military and colonial career ==
He was transferred to French Sudan in 1899 to lead the expansion of colonial rule north of the Senegal River, where Moorish tribes held firm against French rule. This was disguised as an inquiry, whereas the goal of the mission was to lead to the subjugation of the local people. Local tribal rivalries provided Coppolani with an opportunity, and in 1901, he drew up a plan for moving into the territory with a combination of military and political strategies.

Alliances were drawn up with two of the main marabouts of the territory, Shaykh Sidya Baba and Shaykh Saad Bouh, local leaders of Qadiriyya Sufi brotherhoods. They were promised a dominant role in the colonial administration and protection for their Zawiya tribes against the attacks of Hassane warriors. In return they would use their religious influence to persuade the local emirs to accept French rule. With military pressure applied, the strategy worked, and the emirates of Tagant, Trarza and Brakna all accepted French rule in 1903-04. The last emirate, in the northern zone of Adrar, proved combative. It was also backed by a third influential Qadiriyya marabout, shaykh Ma al-'Aynayn, himself in turn supported by the Sultan of Morocco.

Coppolani was preparing to march on Adrar when he was killed in 1905, by a member of the shaykh's Gudfiyya brotherhood. The emirate was eventually defeated and forcibly incorporated into Mauritania in 1912, by General Gouraud, but tribal revolts and raids persisted until 1934.
