= Ma al-'Aynayn =

Saharan Moorish religious and political leader

Shaykh Māʾ al-ʿAynayn ماء العينين
- ماء العينين محمد المصطفى القلقمي
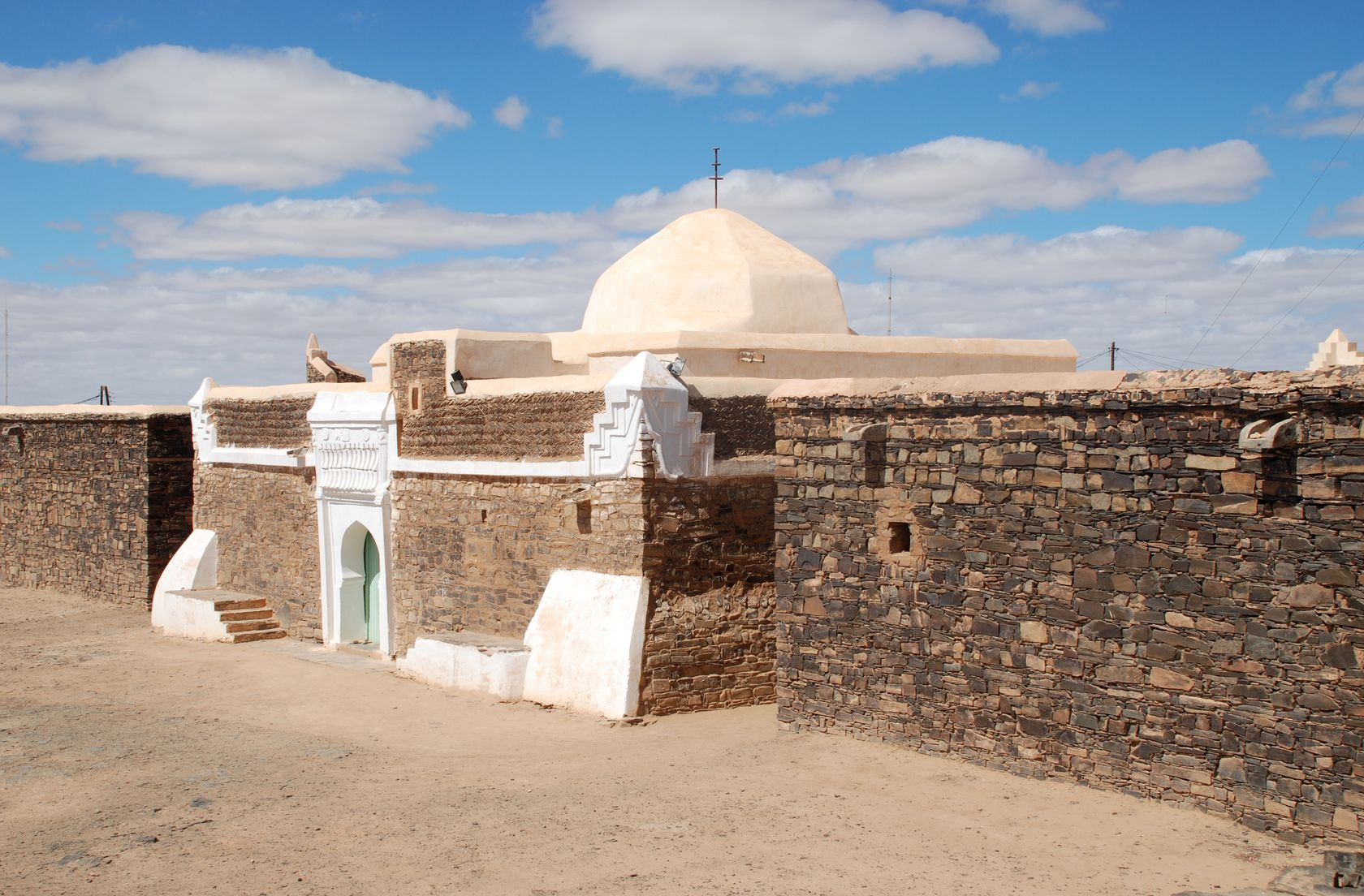
- The zawiya of Ma' al-'Aynayn in Smara.
- Born: February 10, 1831; Hawdh
- Died: October 23, 1910 (aged 79); Tiznit, Morocco
- Burial place: Zawiya of Ma' al-'Aynayn, Tiznit
- Children: Ahmed al-Hiba
- Military career
- Conflicts: French conquest of Morocco

Religious life
- Religion: Islam
- Tariqa: ʿAyniyya (founder)

Muslim leader
- Influenced by: Muhammad Fadil wuld Mamin

Muḥammad al-Muṣṭafā al-Qalqamī (Arabic: محمد المصطفى القلقمي; c. 10 February 1830 – 1910) also known as Māʾ al-ʿAynayn (Arabic: ماء العينين, lit. 'water of two eyes') was a Saharan Moorish religious and political leader who fought French and Spanish colonization in North Africa. He was the son of Mohammed Fadil Mamin (founder of the Fadiliyya, a Qadiriyya Sufi brotherhood), and the elder brother of Shaykh Saad Bouh, a prominent marabout (religious leader) in Mauritania.

== Early life and rise ==
Muhammad al-Mustafa al-Qalqami was born in on 10 February 1830 in the Hawdh region, the twelfth of 48 brothers. His father Muhammad Fadil wuld Mamin was the founder of the Fadiliyya order, a sub-order of the Qadiriyya, and a member of a clan known as the Ahl Taleb al-Mukhtar or Ahl Jih al-Mukhtar. His mother was Manna bint Maʾlum of the Ijayba clan and together they had four daughters and another son. This son, Abu l-Fatḥ, along with Ma al-'Aynayn's paternal grandmother Fatima died the same day Ma al-'Aynayn was born. Ma al-'Aynayn's father is reported as saying that his son would be remarkable as compensation for the deaths of these two. His nickname Māʾ al-ʿAynayn means "water of two eyes" and was given to him by his mother because she was his only living son and losing him would be like losing the fluid in her eyes that allow her to see.

He studied under his father who taught him in the exoteric and esoteric. He memorised the Quran by the age of 7 and given a lot of attention from his father because of his intellectual abilities and physical endurance. He was singled out among his brothers to study in Fes. He left his father at the age of 16 to travel and study under a number of scholars. In 1858, he left to perform the Hajj. On his way to Mecca, he went to Morocco to Essaouira, Marrakesh and Meknes. In Marrakesh, he met the heir to the sultanate, Muhammad ibn Abd al-Rahman, and in Meknes, he met the sultan Abd al-Rahman where he informed him of the affairs in Mauritania and received gifts from Abd al-Rahman. He spent three weeks in Mecca. His meeting with Abd al-Rahman began close links with Morocco onwards and he would regularly visit Marrakesh and Fes from 1873 onwards.

After returning from his pilgrimage, Ma al-'Aynayn briefly stayed at Tindouf. During the journey through the Sahara, he spent time among multiple scholars and was hosted by several Saharan tribes like the Tajakant, al-Arusiyin, Reguibat and Ait Oussa. He returned to his homeland in 1861, where by then he had acquired a reputation for mastery of the esoteric and exoteric religious sciences. The fact that he was the first of his family to return from the Hajj alive served as proof of divine favour locally. Upon his return, his father gave him a turban and the title of Shaykh.

By 1870, Ma al-'Aynayn moved to the Saqiyat al-Hamra. He became the resident saint in that region promoting order and lessening social anarchy. From 1871 to 1872, he established Dār al-Ḥamrāʾ (Arabic: دار الحمراء, lit. 'Red House') which was a zawiya that served as his first headquarters.

In 1879, Sultan Moulay Hassan I initiated a strategic effort to consolidate Moroccan authority over the Sahara by issuing a dahir (royal decree) appointing the influential scholar as his representative. The decree granted the Sheikh jurisdiction over a vast territory stretching from the Souss to the Saguia el Hamra and Tarfaya. This move was designed to counter the influence of regional commercial rivals and European colonial interests.

Initially, Ma al-'Aynayn relied on his religious prestige rather than his official title to gain influence among the independent Saharan tribes. A major turning point occurred in 1888, following the Sheikh’s visit to the Sultan in Marrakech. Having secured significant military supplies and modern weaponry from the Makhzen, Ma al-'Aynayn began to openly assert his administrative and military authority.

Following the death of Moulay Hassan I in 1894, the alliance shifted into a phase of intense logistical cooperation under the regency of Ba Ahmed. Recognizing the Sheikh as a vital barrier against French Saharan expansion, the Moroccan government began regular maritime resupply missions to Tarfaya. Starting in 1897, Ma al-Aynayn made annual visits to the royal court in Marrakech, while the Moroccan state-owned steamship "Turki", commanded by German officer Leonhard Karow, was deployed to deliver significant quantities of grain and merchandise to sustain the Sheikh’s regional operations.

In 1898, Ma al-'Aynayn began building a Ribat in Smara, in the Spanish Sahara (present-day Western Sahara). His goal in creating the Ribat, which was previously just a water center for travelers, was to launch attacks on European colonial forces and particularly the French. The Moroccan sultan Abdelaziz assisted him in building the Ribat, as he sent craftsmen, materials, financing and arms. In 1902, he moved there creating among other things an Islamic library.

== Anticolonial revolt ==
Increasingly disturbed by Western penetration of the area, which he viewed both as an intrusion by hostile foreign powers and as a Christian assault on Islam, he began agitating for resistance. Local Saharan tribes performed ghazi raids against the foreign forces, but French troops drew ever closer, conquering one local ruler after another. In 1904, Ma al-'Aynayn proclaimed a holy war, or jihad, against the colonizers. Sultan Abdelaziz of Morocco did not have control over Ma al-'Aynayn's forces but this display of effective cooperation helped assemble a large coalition of tribes to fight the colonizers. Ma al-'Aynayn set about acquiring firearms and other materials both through channels in Morocco and through direct negotiations with rival European powers such as Germany, and quickly built up a sizable fighting force. A member of his Gudfiyya brotherhood in 1905 may have assassinated Xavier Coppolani, who was leading the French conquest of Mauritania, thereby delaying the conquest of the emirate of Adrar for a few years.

=== Character assassination in the press ===
Sheikh Ma’ al-‘Aynayn was the target of an extensive character assassination campaign in the French arabophone newspaper Es-Saada, published out of the French Legation in Tangier. The newspaper called the qaid and spiritual leader’s patriotism and religious devotion into question, describing him as an unscrupulous mendicant and arms smuggler, even peddling rumors that his followers were Shia.

On Ma’ al-‘Aynayn es-Saada published:

"عاد شيخ الصحراء إلى دسائسه المفطور عليها، فقام بما هايج من الخواطر يوم مروره بالشواطئ البحرية عند رجوعه إلى مقره، ولم يقنع بما ناله من الأموال وحاز من الهدايا، بل أرسل الآن ولده إلى فاس يتظاهر أمام المخزن باستعداد أبيه لحماية المخزن وإخراج الإفرنسيين من وجدة"
"The sheikh of the Sahara has returned to his old tricks; he stirred up memories when he, discontent with the money he made and the gifts he got passing by the coast on his return to his base, sent his son to Fes to appear before the Makhzen, appealing with his father’s readiness to protect the Makhzen and oust the French from Oujda."

and:

"لم يكن إشفاق المولى عبد العزيز على هذا الشيخ ولا أكرمه سخاء على حاشيته وأتباعه فمازلنا نتذكر الأنعام العديدة التي حباه بها في العام الماضي والذنوب الكبيرة التي تحمل المخون مسؤوليتها يوم مروره بالدار البيضاء وكيف كانت العمال تقاد إلى طاعة الشيخ صاغرة كالنعاج لدى الراعي والأمناء تتسابق للتبريك …حاملة الهدايا والدراهم، والشيخ يهزأ بالمخزن ويضحك عليه"
"Abdelaziz had no compassion for the sheikh, nor did he honor him for the sake of his entourage and supporters. We still remember the gifts bestowed upon him last year, and the great wrongs the day the ungrateful sheikh passed through Casablanca, and how the laborers were made to submit to him, supplicating like sheep around a shepherd while their managers jostled to bless him, bearing gifts and money. The sheikh mocks the Makhzen and laughs at it."

== Defeat of Morocco and final years ==
In 1906 the Sultan Abdelaziz ratified the Algeciras Conference, granting colonial powers substantial concessions over Morocco, Ma al-'Aynayn's deemed this a betrayal, and supported in 1907 the Sultan's brother and rival Abdelhafid (at the time opposed to the French). The flow of arms from the Makhzen dwindled as a result. The French forces under then-colonel Gouraud pushed forward in the French Sudan, and Ma al-'Aynayn was forced to retreated to Tiznit (Morocco) in 1908-1909 determined to fight along Abdelhafid in dethroning his brother, which they succeeded in doing.

In 1910, anarchy spread through Morocco, as the new Sultan grew ever weaker under European pressures. Ma al-'Aynayn, concerned that Morocco would fall into European hands, decided to extend Jihad north of Tiznit at the head of an army of 6,000 men to overthrow the new Sultan Abdelhafid. He was defeated by French General Moinier, on June 23, 1910. He would die several months later at Tiznit, on October 23 of the same year.

== Literature ==
The Shaykh Ma al-'Aynayn was a prolific writer who was attributed 140 books by the biographer Murabbih Rabbuh in Qurrat al-Aynayn and 314 by Spanish anthropologist Julio Caro Baroja.

One of these was Mubṣir al-mutashawwif ʻalá Muntakhab al-Taṣawwuf.

== Family ==
Ma al-'Aynayn extended his influence through marriages. According to al-Mukhtar al-Susi, he had a total of 116 marriages. al-Susi notes that he would constantly marry and divorce women as the Saharans did not disapprove of this practice. French explorer Camille Douls confirmed this observation noting that he only limited them to four wives at any point. According to Paul Marty, he had 21 sons and 30 daughters. The Historical Dictionary of Western Sahara claims he had 33 sons. These include:

- Aḥmad al-Hība
- Mrabbīh Rabbu
- Muḥammad al-Aghẓaf
- al-Wālī
- Muḥammad al-Ghayth al-Niʿma
- Muḥammad Taqī Allāh (also known as Ibn al-Samīn)
- Muḥammad al-Imām
- al-Ṭālib Akhyār

His descendants have become so numerous that they have become a small prestigious tribe referred to as "Ahl Shaykh Ma al-'Aynayn". The Spanish authorities counted 363 members in 1974 and they are spread throughout Morocco, Mauritania and Western Sahara.

== Legacy ==
A few years after Ma al-'Aynayn's death, his son El-Hiba, known as The Blue Sultan, continued the war against the French, but was ultimately defeated.

Ma al-'Aynayn enjoyed tremendous prestige and his name is invoked by both the Morocco and the Polisario Front. For Moroccans, he embodied the idea of unity of Morocco and the Sahara. Many descendants of Ma al-'Aynayn hold high-profile offices in Morocco as well as in the Polisario Front and in Mauritania.

Ma al-'Aynayn, is buried in Tiznit, Morocco where his tomb became a pilgrimage site.

=== In Literature ===
The novel Désert weaves a story of a young Tuareg boy caught up in Ma-al;'Aynayn's 1910 expedition with a second story of a Tuareg woman's struggles in the modern (1980s) world.

== See also ==
- History of Mauritania
- History of Morocco
- History of Western Sahara
- List of tariqas

== Sources ==
- Martin, B. G. (1976). "Ma' al-'Aynayn al-Qalqami, Mauritanian Mystic and Politician". Muslim Brotherhoods in Nineteenth-Century Africa. Cambridge University Press. pp. 125–152. ISBN 978-0-521-53451-2.
- Abdulrazak, Fawzi (1990). The kingdom of the book: The history of printing as an agency of change in Morocco between 1865 and 1912 (PDF) (PhD thesis). Boston University.
- Blalack, July (2020). "Al-Shaikh Māʾ al-ʿAynayn: Maghrebi-Saharan literary geographies on the eve of colonization". Journal of the African Literature Association. 14 (3): 407–419. doi:10.1080/21674736.2020.1812207.
- Norris, H. T (1968a). "S̱ẖayḵẖ Mā' al-'Aynayn al-Qalqamī in the Folk-Literature of the Spanish Sahara—I". Bulletin of the School of Oriental and African Studies. 31 (1): 113–136. doi:10.1017/S0041977X00112819. ISSN 0041-977X. JSTOR 612006.
