= Ahl Taleb al-Mukhtar =

Tribe in Mauritania

Ahl Taleb al-Mukhtar أهل طالب المختار
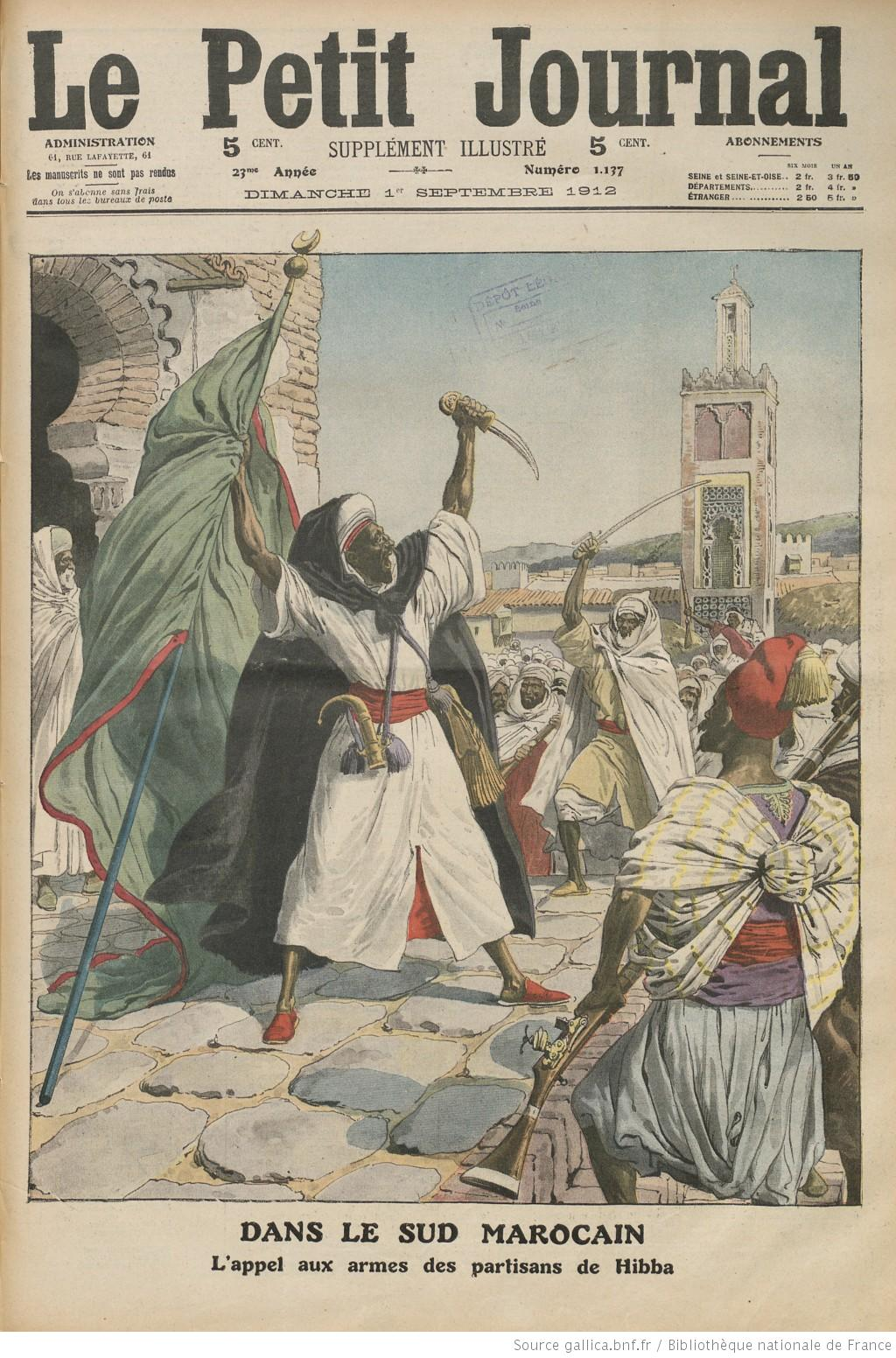
- Ethnicity: Arab
- Location: Mauritania
- Language: Hassaniya Arabic
- Religion: Sunni Islam

Ahl Taleb al-Mukhtar (in Arabic: أهل طالب المختار) is a Moorish tribe in Mauritania. It is the clan of the renowned shaykh and anticolonial leader Ma al-'Aynayn.

== History and Origins ==
The Ahl Taleb al-Mukhtar claim a Sharifian descent from ancestors that had migrated in the 17th century from Tafilalt in Morocco to Mauritania. They specifically claim an Idrisid genealogy. Spanish officer Doménech Lafuente, however, claims that they descend from Lamtuna Berbers.

== Religious Order ==
The Ahl Taleb al-Mukhtar family is largely Sufi, belonging to the Qadiriyya order. One of the family patriarchs, Muhammad Fâdil ben Mâmîn, founded one of its branches, called the Fadiliyya. It spread across much of Mauritania and West Africa, mainly in Senegal, through his two sons, Cheikh Saad Bouh and Ma al-'Aynayn
