= Gudfiyya =

The Gudfiyya (or Goudfiyya, and other spellings) brotherhood was a small, militant religious organization created by the Sufi Qadiriyya shaykh Ma al-'Aynayn, in his battle against French and Spanish colonizers in the western Maghreb (in North-west Africa).

A member of the Gudfiyya in 1905 assassinated Xavier Coppolani, stalling French attempts to attack the Adrar emirate in today's northern Mauritania.
