= Ahmed al-Hiba =

Morocco resistance fighter (1877–1919)

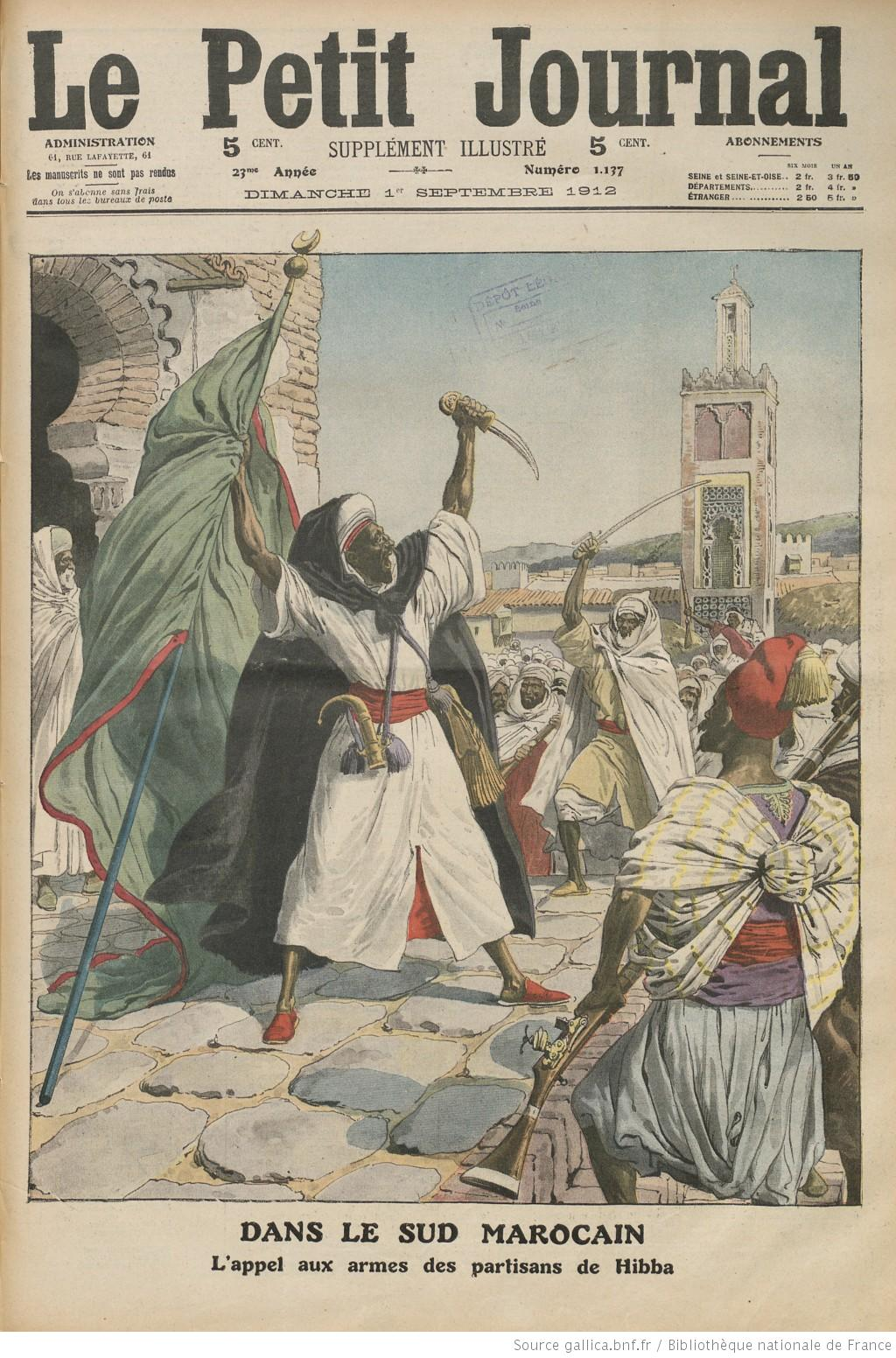
- The French periodical Le Petit Journal's portrayal of al-Hiba's call to arms to his partisans. 1 September 1912.
- Born: 9 September 1877
- Died: 26 June 1919 (aged 41); Kerdous, Tiznit Province
- Military career
- Service years: 1910–1919
- Conflicts: Battle of Sidi Bou Othman

Mawlayeh Ahmed Haybat Allah ibn Ma al-Aynayn (Note: Arabic: مولاي أحمد هيبة الله بن ماء العينين, romanized: Mawlāy Aḥmad Haybat Allāh ibn Māʾ al-ʿAynayn; known simply as Ahmed al-Hiba (Arabic: أحمد الهيبة, romanized: Aḥmad al-Hība) and by the nickname The Blue Sultan (Arabic: السلطان الأزرق).) (9 September 1877 (Note: According to the Second Edition of the Encyclopedia of Islam, al-Hiba was born on Ramadan 1293 or 1294 which is some time in September or October in 1876 or 1877.) – 26 June 1919), was a leader of an armed resistance to the French colonial power in Morocco, and was the Blue Sultan of Morocco.

In English texts he is usually named simply El Hiba. In addition to his revolutionary activity, Ahmed al-Hiba was a prolific poet.

== Early life ==
Ahmed Haybat Allah ibn Ma al-Aynayn was born on 9 September 1877. He was the son of Ma al-'Aynayn, a religious leader of the Sahara. In 1910, al-Aynayn crossed the High Atlas with his veiled, camel-riding Saharan troops (nicknamed the "Blue Men"), aiming to liberate Casablanca, but he was defeated by the French at Tadla on 23 June 1910, and forced to retreat to Tiznit (in the Anti-Atlas foothills of the Souss valley), where he died shortly after.

== Resistance ==
Shortly after Ma al-Aynayn's death, in 1912 the French imposed the Treaty of Fez on the Moroccans and took virtual control of the country. Ma al-'Aynayn's son al-Hiba then decided that this effectively vacated the position of Sultan of Morocco, and proclaimed himself Sultan at Tiznit (Morocco) as his father had done before him.

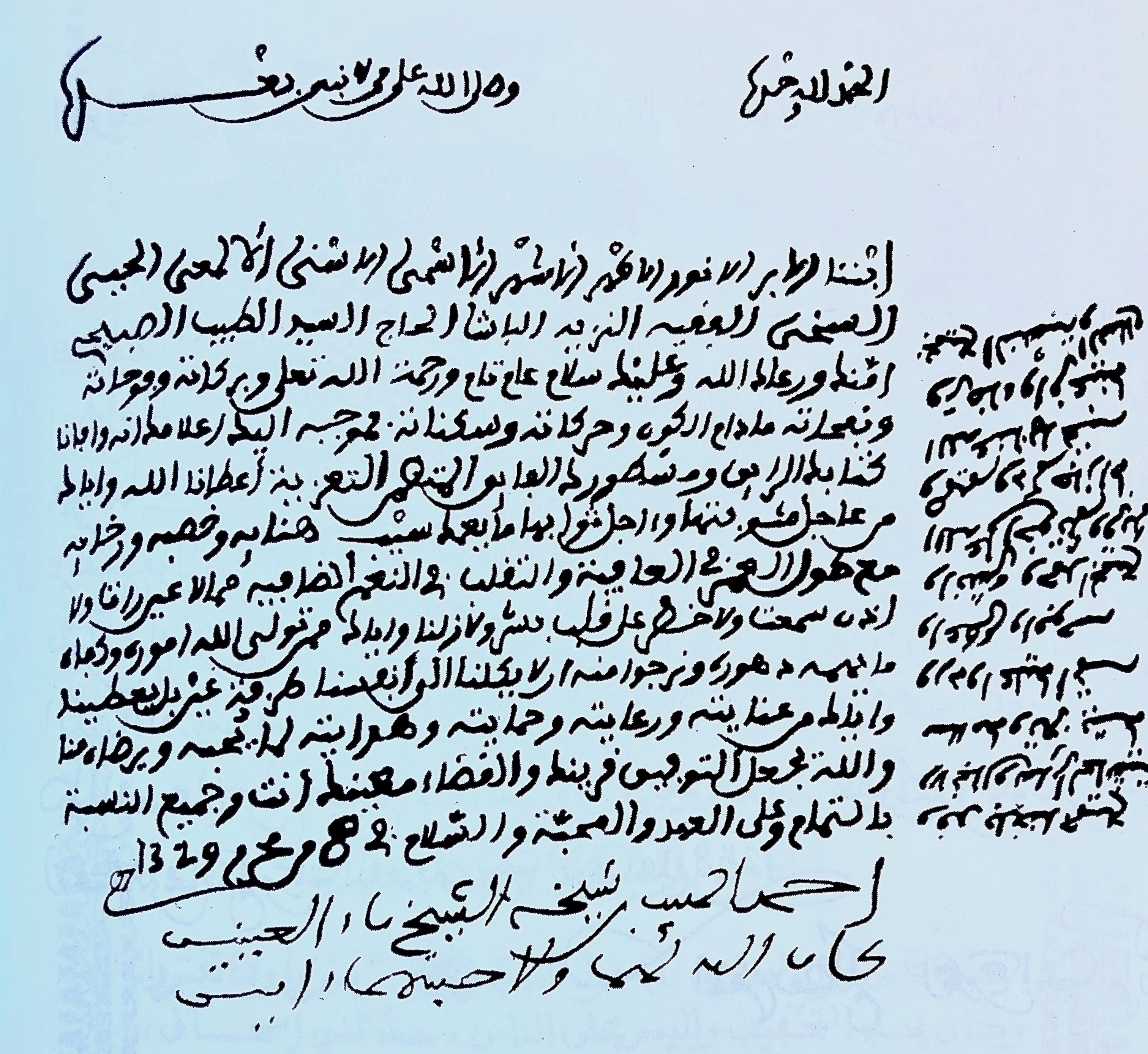
A letter by Ahmed al-Hiba bin Ma' al-Ainayn to the Pasha of Salé at-Tayib as-Sabīhī written in musnid Maghrebi script dated 8 Muharram, 1329 (8 January 1911).

A general uprising in the south of Morocco saw al-Hiba recognized as Sultan in Taroudannt, Agadir and the Dades and Draa regions. He gained a powerful ally in Si Madani, head of the Glaoua family. With his tribal army he entered Marrakech on 18 August 1912 and was proclaimed Sultan there also.

The decisive Battle of Sidi Bou Othman with the French took place near Marrakech on 6 September 1912. al-Hiba's forces were defeated by the French commanded by Charles Mangin, with the loss of some 2,000 tribal warriors.

In January 1913, he was driven out of Taroudant, where he had taken refuge after fleeing Marrakech, by troops led by Thami El Glaoui, Taïeb el Goundafi, and Haida Ou Mouis.

He was finally welcomed in 1915 in Kerdous, in the Anti-Atlas, by a local notable, Addi Ou Ahmed. In January, he received a German delegation seeking allies against the French. He was not the only one approached during this period, including Sheriff Muhammad al-Hijami, Mohammed Al-Mamoune (al-Hibba's cousin), and Moha Ou Hammou Zayani.

At the end of 1916, "Captain Chleuh", Léopold Justinard, was sent to Tiznit to monitor the Sultan of Kerdous, whom the German mission led by Edgar Proebster was trying to supply with weapons by landing from a submarine at the mouth of the Dra River. In 1917, he miraculously escaped the aerial bombardment of Kerdous. He died of natural causes on June 23, 1919, in Kerdous, where his tomb is located. His brother Merebbi Rebbo succeeded him.

== Notes ==
Preceded by Abd al-Hafid	Proclaimed; Sultan of Morocco; 1912	Succeeded by Yusef
