= 8 cm Kanone C/80 =

German field artillery

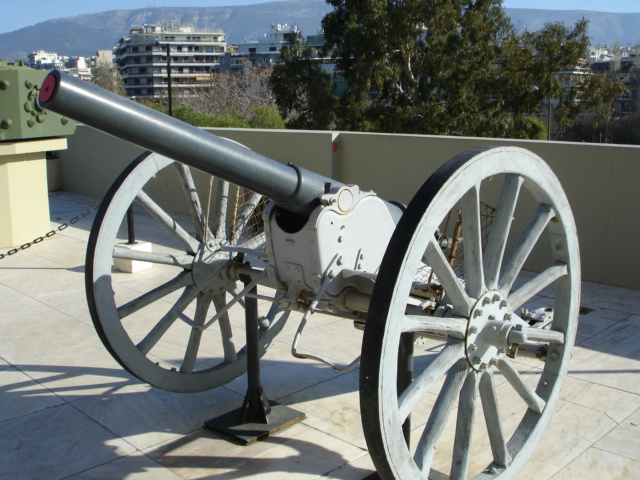
- An 8 cm Kanone C/80 at the Athens War Museum.
- Type: Field gun
- Place of origin: German Empire

Service history
- In service: 1880−1922
- Used by: See users
- Wars: See wars

Production history
- Designer: Krupp
- Designed: 1880
- Manufacturer: Krupp
- Produced: 1880

Specifications
- Mass: 850 kg (1,870 lb)
- Barrel length: 2 m (6 ft 7 in) L/27
- Shell: Separate-loading, bagged charges and projectiles
- Shell weight: Common: 4.3 kg (9 lb 8 oz); Canister: 4.9 kg (10 lb 13 oz); Shrapnel: 4.3 kg (9 lb 8 oz)
- Caliber: 75 mm (3 in)
- Breech: Horizontal sliding-block
- Recoil: None
- Carriage: Box trail
- Elevation: +8° to +24°
- Traverse: None
- Rate of fire: 10 rpm
- Muzzle velocity: 460 m/s (1,500 ft/s)
- Maximum firing range: 6 km (3.7 mi)

The 8 cm Kanone C/80 was a field gun developed during the late 1800s by Krupp for the export market. It saw action in numerous regional conflicts as well as World War I.

== History ==
After the Franco-Prussian War, the German Army began to study replacements for its existing C/61 breech loaded cannon. Although the breech-loaded steel C/61 had outclassed its French muzzle-loading bronze rivals during the war, its Wahrendorff breech was unpopular with gun crews. The new gun, designated the C/73 would retain the same 78.5 mm (3.09 in) caliber of the C/61, and would equip cavalry artillery regiments of the German Army.

Krupp was also active on the export market at this time and one of their stock models was the C/80, which although similar to the C/73 had a longer 27 caliber barrel. Despite being called an 8 cm cannon in the Krupp catalog, it actually fired 75 mm (3 in) ammunition. The German and Austro-Hungarian Army during that period rounded up to the nearest centimeter. To confuse things even further the C/80 was often given model numbers by their customers based on the year they were purchased or when their armories began licensed production.

The C/80 armed the Ottoman Empire and the Balkan states during the late 1800s and during World War I. These were either purchased from Krupp, produced under license or were captured from the Ottomans during the Balkan Wars. The Turks used C/73's and C/80's that they had converted to makeshift anti-aircraft guns as late as 1922.

== Design ==
The C/80 was of built-up construction with a central rifled tube, a reinforcing hoop from the trunnions to the breech and used new smokeless powder for greater muzzle velocity and range. The C/80 used the same type of breech as the C/73 known as a cylindro-prismatic breech that was a predecessor of Krupp's horizontal sliding-block and the gun used separate-loading, bagged charges and projectiles. Since the C/80 had limited elevation +8° to +24° it was a direct fire weapon meant to fire on infantry in the open and the most common types of shells were common, canister and shrapnel. Like the C/73 the C/80 was normally assigned to cavalry artillery batteries.

The C/80 had a box trail carriage built from bolted steel plates instead of wood. The C/80 did not have a recoil mechanism or a gun shield. For transport, the gun was attached to a limber for towing by a 6-horse team. The limber also had seats for crew members plus ammunition and supplies. There were also seats attached to the axle of the gun carriage for the crew.

== Users ==
- Albania
- Brazil
- Kingdom of Bulgaria
- Chile
- Kingdom of Greece
- Kingdom of Montenegro
- Orange Free State
- Ottoman Empire
- Kingdom of Romania
- Kingdom of Serbia

== Wars ==
- Greco-Turkish War (1897)
- War of the Pacific
- Second Boer War
- Italo-Turkish War
- Balkan Wars
- World War I
- Greco-Turkish War (1919–1922)

== Photo Gallery ==
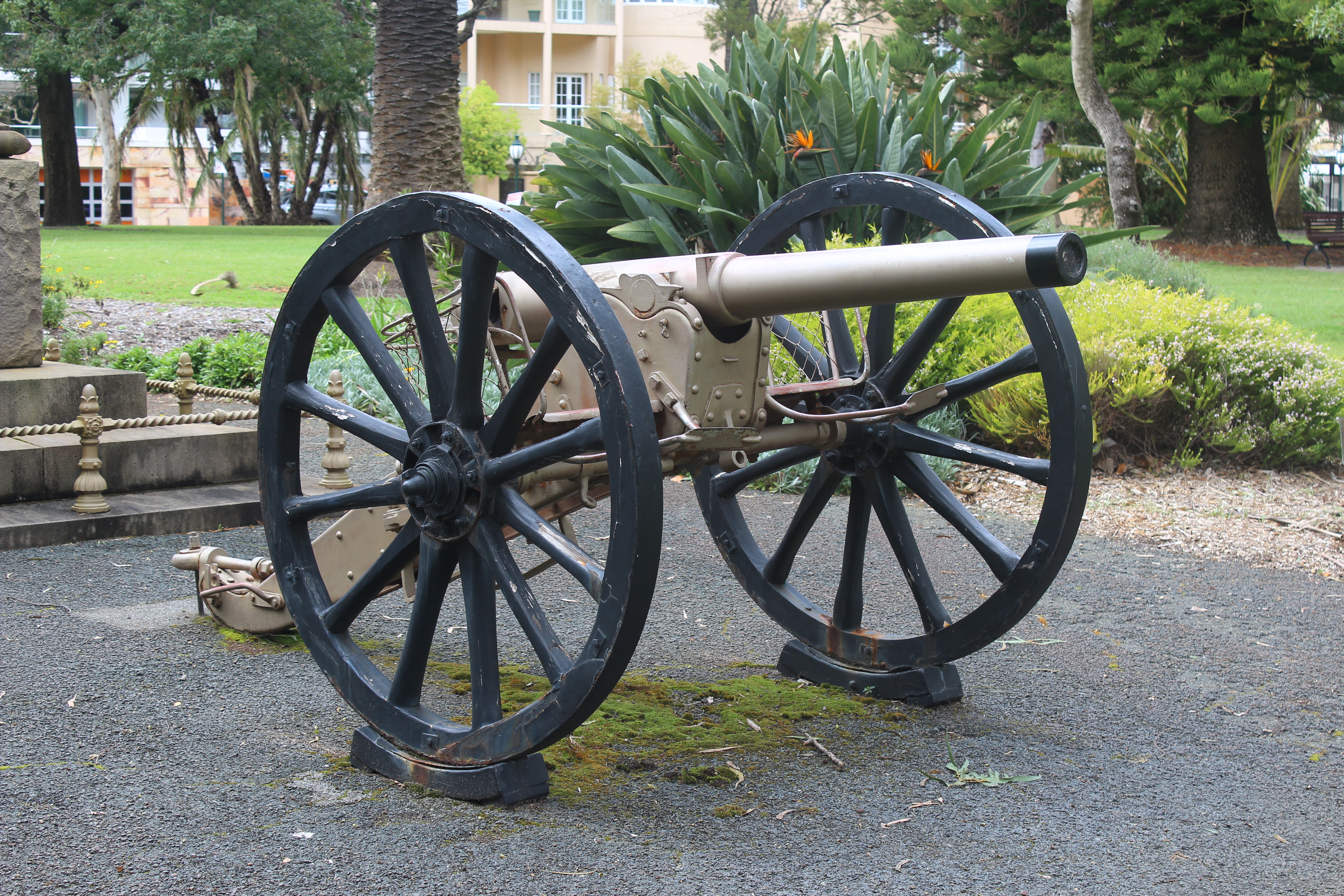
One of the eight C/80's manufactured in 1897 for the Orange Free State and captured at the Battle of Bothaville.

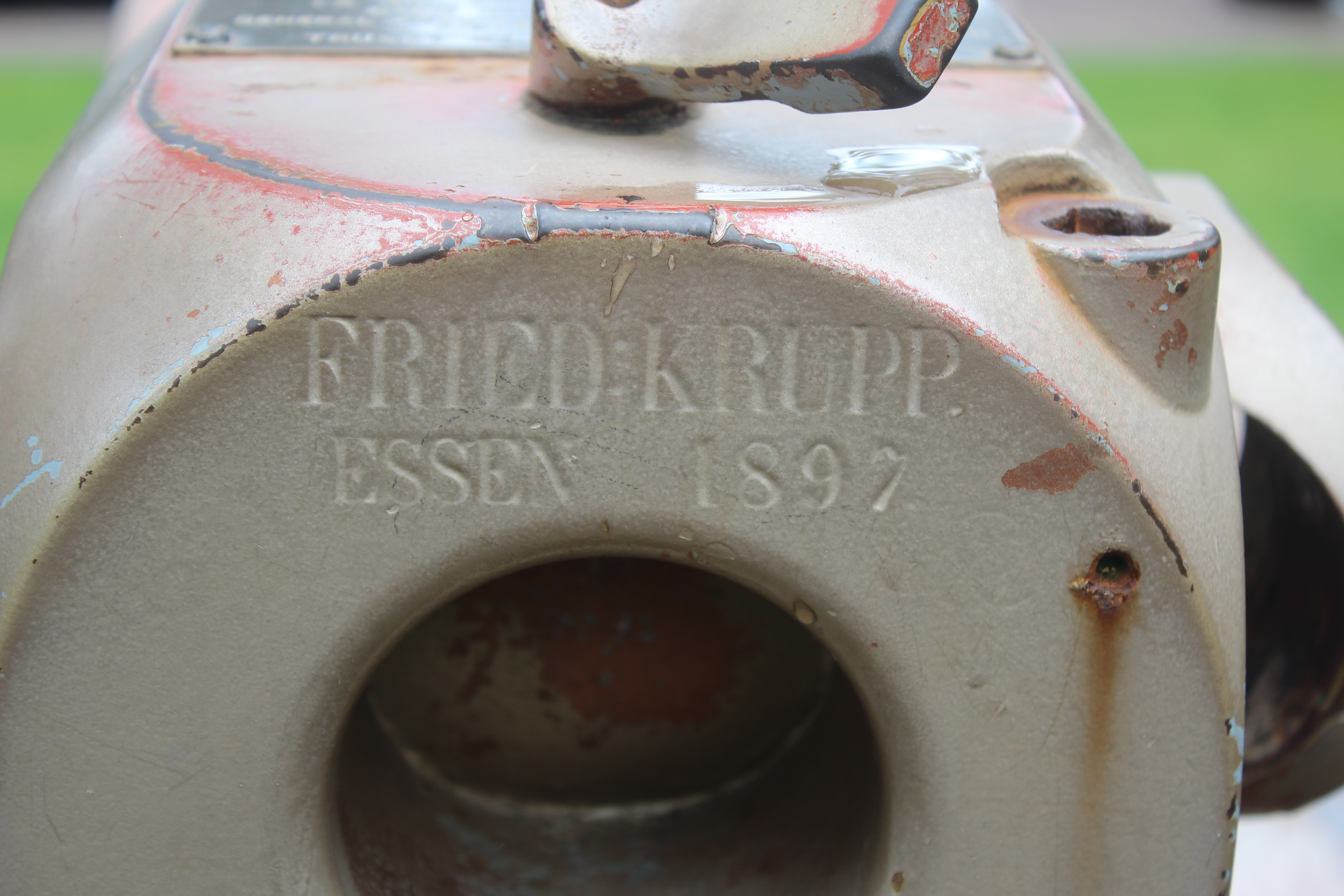
Since 1906 it has been part of the Western Australian Memorial in Kings Park, Perth.

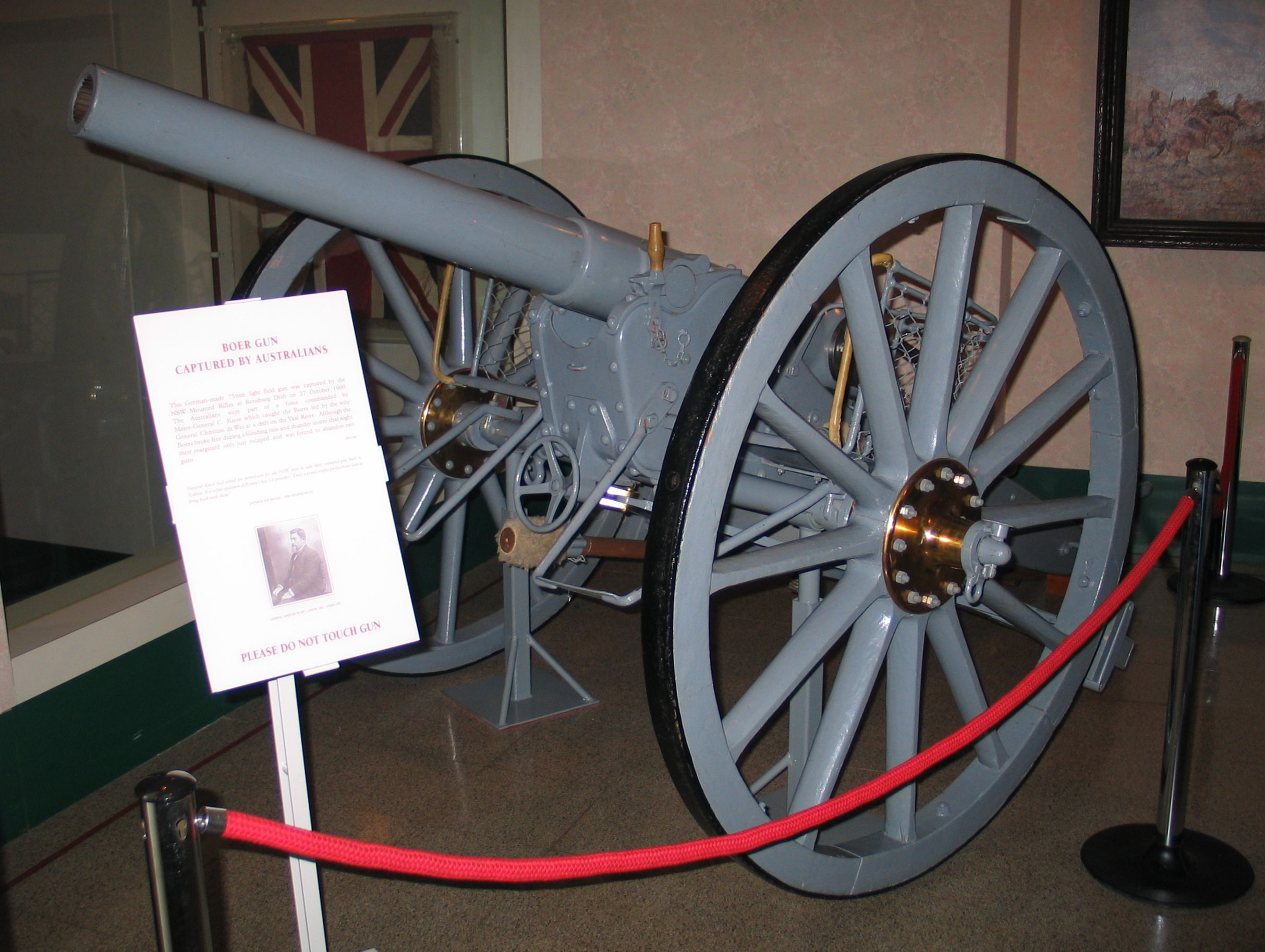
A C/80 at the Australian War Memorial, Canberra, Australia. The gun was captured by NSW Mounted Rifles at Rensburg Drift, 27 October 1900.

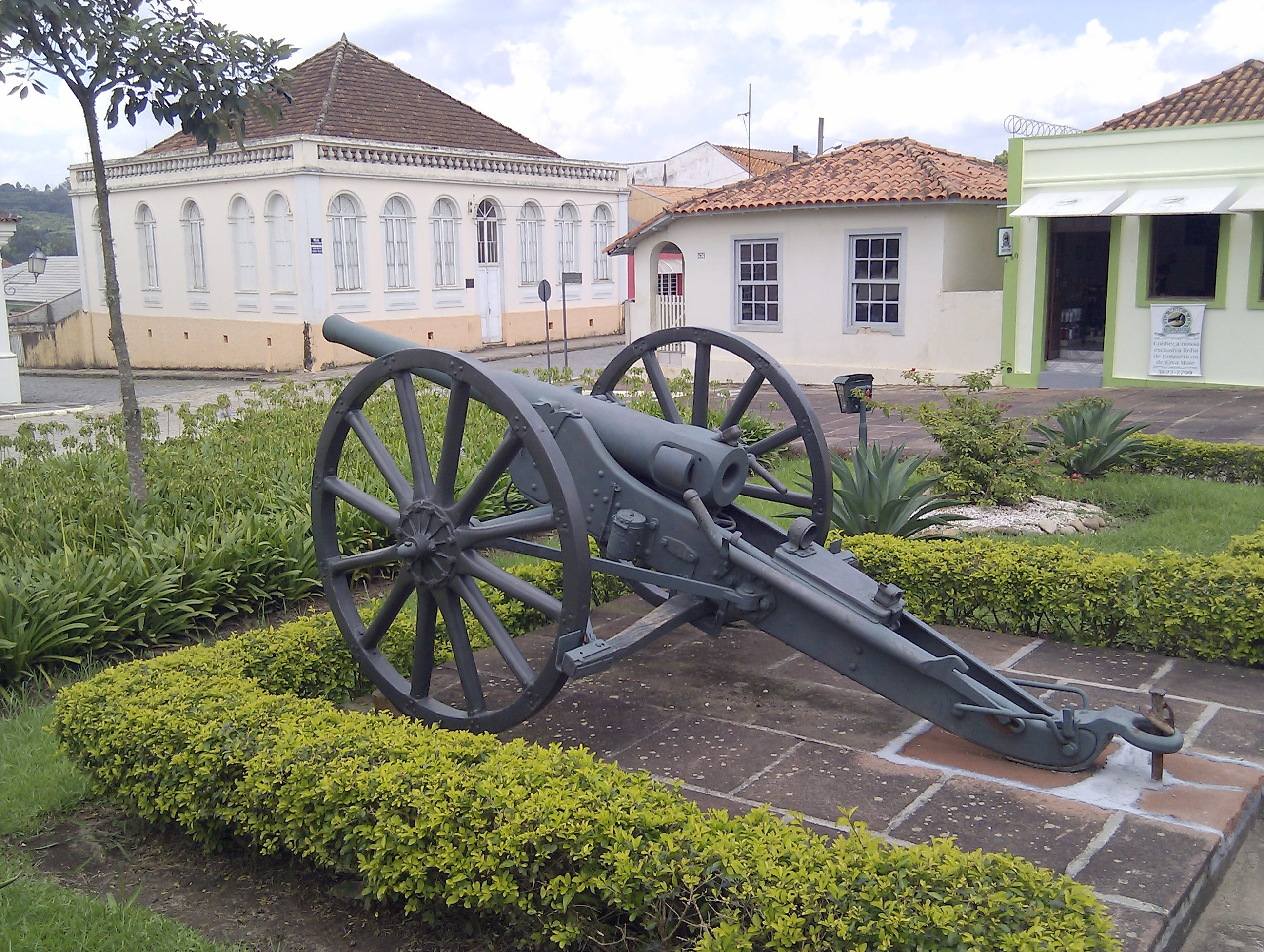
A Brazilian gun.

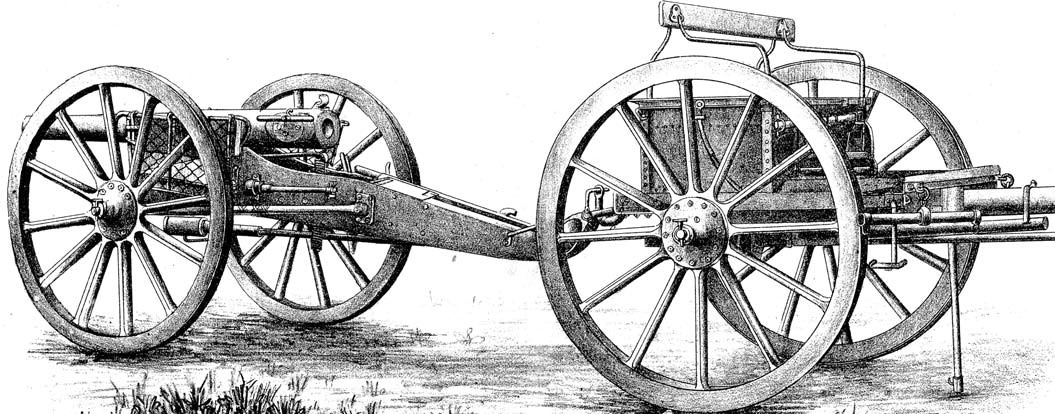
A C/80 with limber.

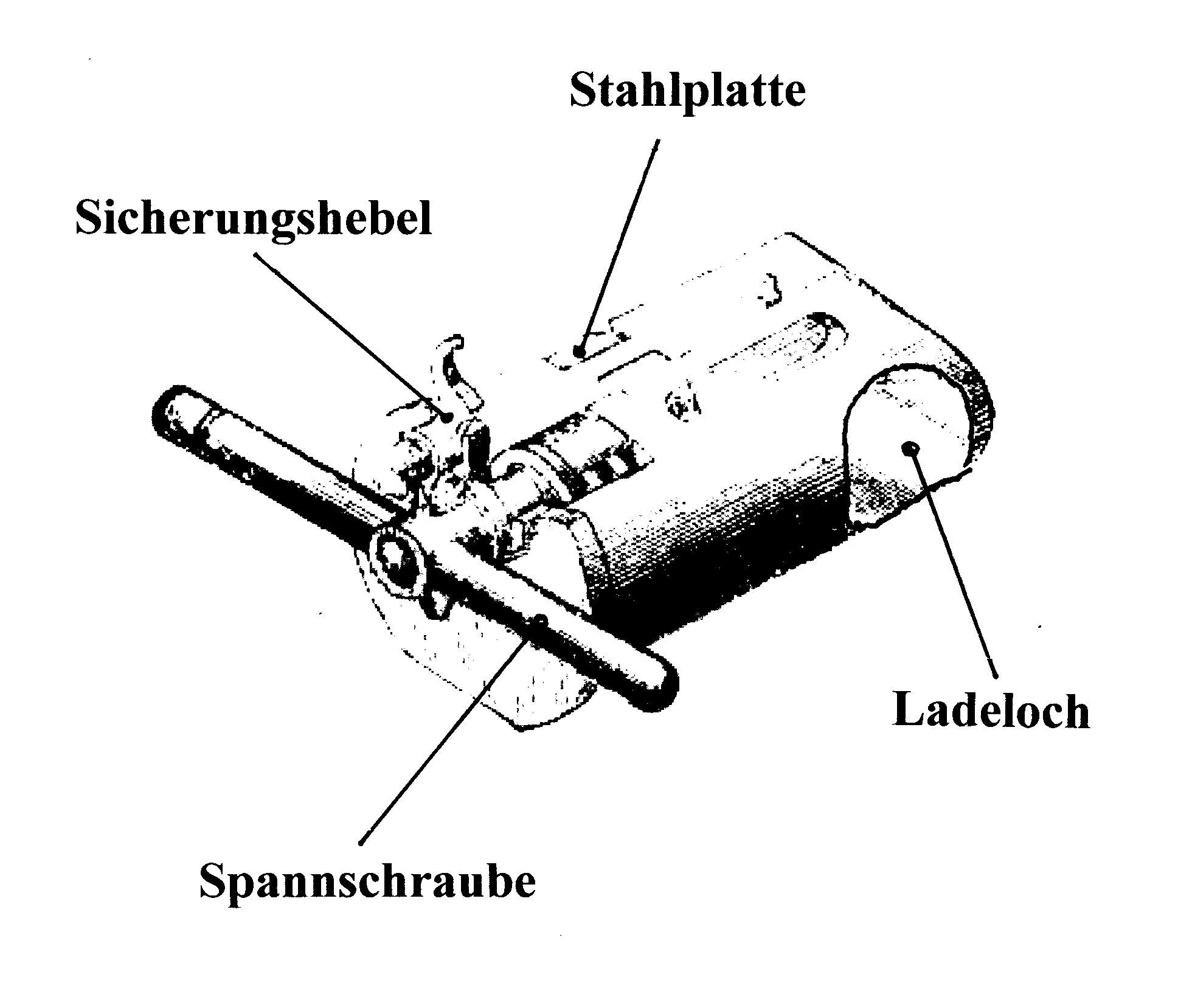
The breech block of the C/80.
