= Léopold Justinard =

French soldier, Berber language expert (1878-1959)

Léopold Victor Justinard (May 14, 1878 - February 8, 1959), born in Nogent-sur-Seine, was a French soldier and Berber speaker, who was awarded the Grand Cross of the Legion of Honour.

== Biography ==
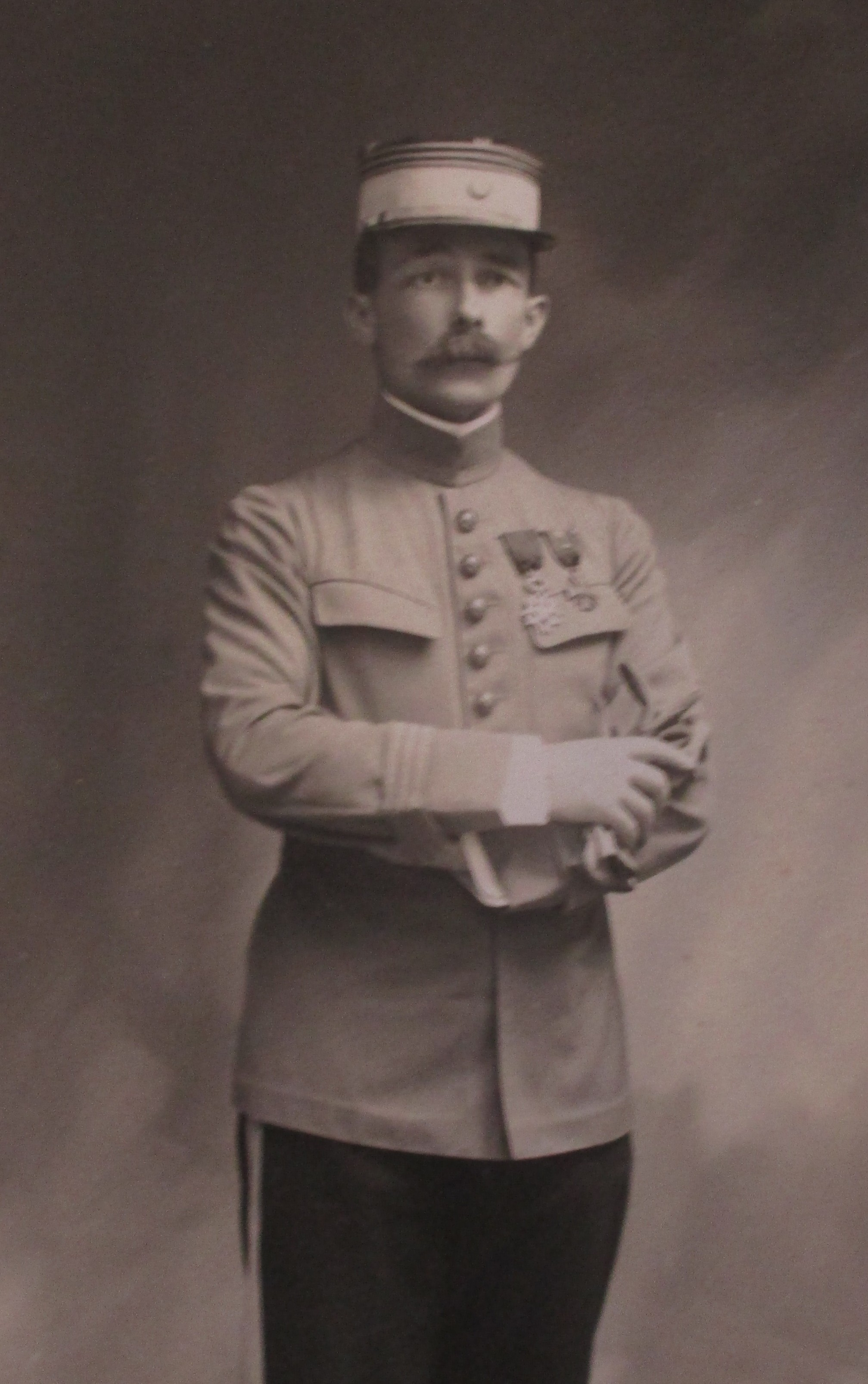
Léopold Justinard (1878-1959)

== Family ==
He was the eldest son of Léopold Jérémie Justinard, a minor notable from Nogent-sur-Seine, and Marie Eugénie Yver, from Pont-sur-Seine.

From his marriage to Marie-Charlotte Donau (1922), he had a son, Pierre Justinard (1923-2011), a diplomat.

== Military career ==
After graduating from the École Spéciale Militaire de Saint-Cyr (1897-1899, Bourbaki class), he spent two years in the 148th Infantry Regiment in Givet before leaving for Algeria, where he joined the 3rd Algerian Rifle Regiment. There, he learned spoken Arabic with the troops under his command, then literary Arabic with the Kabyle imam of a mosque in Béjaïa (formerly Bougie).

In 1911, at his request, he was accepted into the French Military Mission in Morocco, under the command of Colonel Mangin, tasked with training the army of the Sultan of the time (Moulay Hafid).

During this period, he settled in Fez, in the Keddan district. His neighbors and friends included compatriots such as Samuel Biarnay and Maurice Tranchant de Lunel

He survived the bloody days of Fez (April 17–19, 1912) thanks to his loyal troops (barracked in Tamdert). It was with these troops, largely from the Marrakech region, that he learned one of the Berber languages (Tashelhiyt, sometimes called Shilha) used in Morocco, and for which he wrote his first textbook. It was during this time that he received the nickname Captain Chleuh, referring to the usual French word for the Tashelhiyt language.

At the outbreak of the First World War (1914-1918), he was on leave in the Middle East. He quickly returned to France, where he fought and was wounded several times. In early 1915, he joined the Moroccan rifle regiments sent to fight in France. Following a period of convalescence following an injury, Captain Justinard was persuaded by General Lyautey to return to Morocco. Justinard accepted on the condition that he be employed in the Marrakech region, in the intelligence service.

After a few months in Marrakech, on a mission by Colonel de Lamothe, he was sent to Tiznit to counter a German mission led by Edgar Proebster (spelled "Pröbster" in German), tasked with supporting the populations of southern Morocco who followed the Sultan of Kerdous (Anti-Atlas), Moulay Ahmed el Hiba. Captain Justinard held this post for almost five years (1916-1921). In 1917, his mission was reinforced by the presence of the caid Taïeb el Goundafi and his troops

The novelist Claude Farrère drew inspiration from him for the character of Captain Louis de Chassagnes in the novel The New Men (1922).

In 1921, the caid Goundafi fell from grace and was recalled to Marrakech; Commander Justinard asked to end his mission in Tiznit. He was recalled to Marrakech to serve as the prince's educator from 1921 to 1924. General Lyautey entrusted him with the mission of supervising the then crown prince presumptive: Moulay Driss ben Youssef. In 1925, Abdelkrim's successes in the Rif caused concern (the Rif War). On June 2, 1926, a few days after Abdelkrim's surrender at Targuist, Commander Justinard suffered a plane crash after an intelligence mission in the Rif chief's stronghold. He will keep his face mutilated and his sight diminished.

== Berber studies ==
For nearly two years, Commander Justinard, hospitalized in Taza, Casablanca, and then Paris, underwent numerous surgeries and long periods of convalescence. He returned to Morocco in 1928, appointed to the sociological section of the Directorate of Indigenous Affairs in Rabat. His director was Édouard Michaux-Bellaire. In 1930, upon the latter's death, he succeeded him as head of the section. Until he was "delisted" in 1941, Colonel Léopold Justinard coordinated and wrote numerous publications related to the Berbers of Morocco. He interrupted his scholarly work in 1934 to peacefully participate in the reduction of the last pocket of resistance in southern Morocco

From 1937 to 1956 (the date of his return to France), he lived in the medina of Salé, near Bab Jdid. He died in Paris in 1959.

== Selected publications ==
- 1914: Manuel de berbère marocain, dialecte chleuh
- 1926: Manuel de berbère marocain, dialecte rifain
- 1930: Les Aït Ba Amran
- 1933: Notes sur l'histoire du Sous au 16e siècle
- 1940: La Rihla du marabout de Tasaft
- 1951: Un grand chef berbère, le caïd Goundafi
- 1953: Fawaïd
- 1954: Un petit royaume berbère, le Tazeroualt. Un saint berbère, Sidi Ahmed ou Moussa
- 2026: Mes amis les Chleuhs. Souvenirs et scènes de vie berbères
