= Tiznit =

Tiznit ⵜⵉⵣⵏⵉⵜ (Standard Moroccan Tamazight) تزنيت (Arabic)
- City
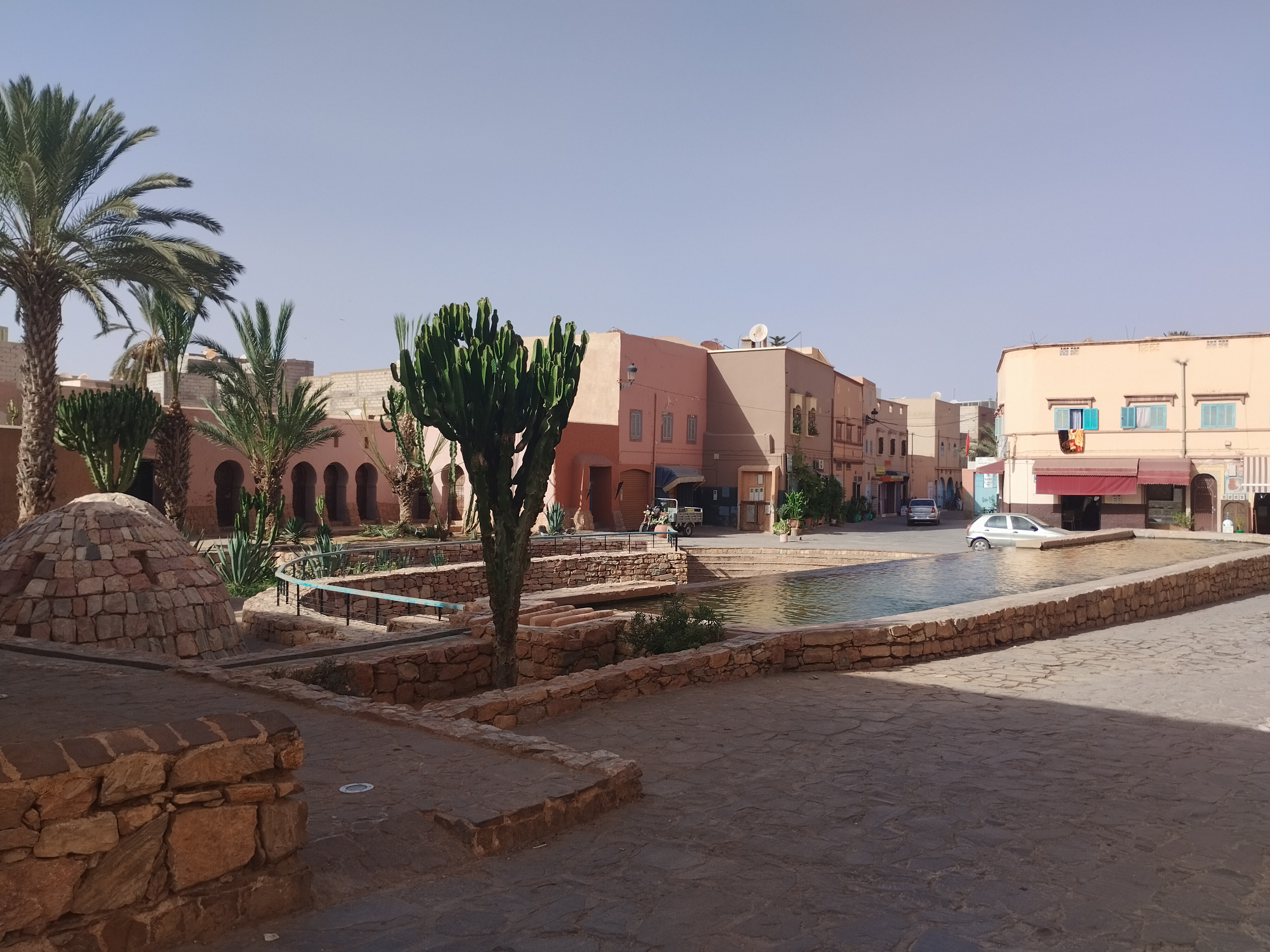
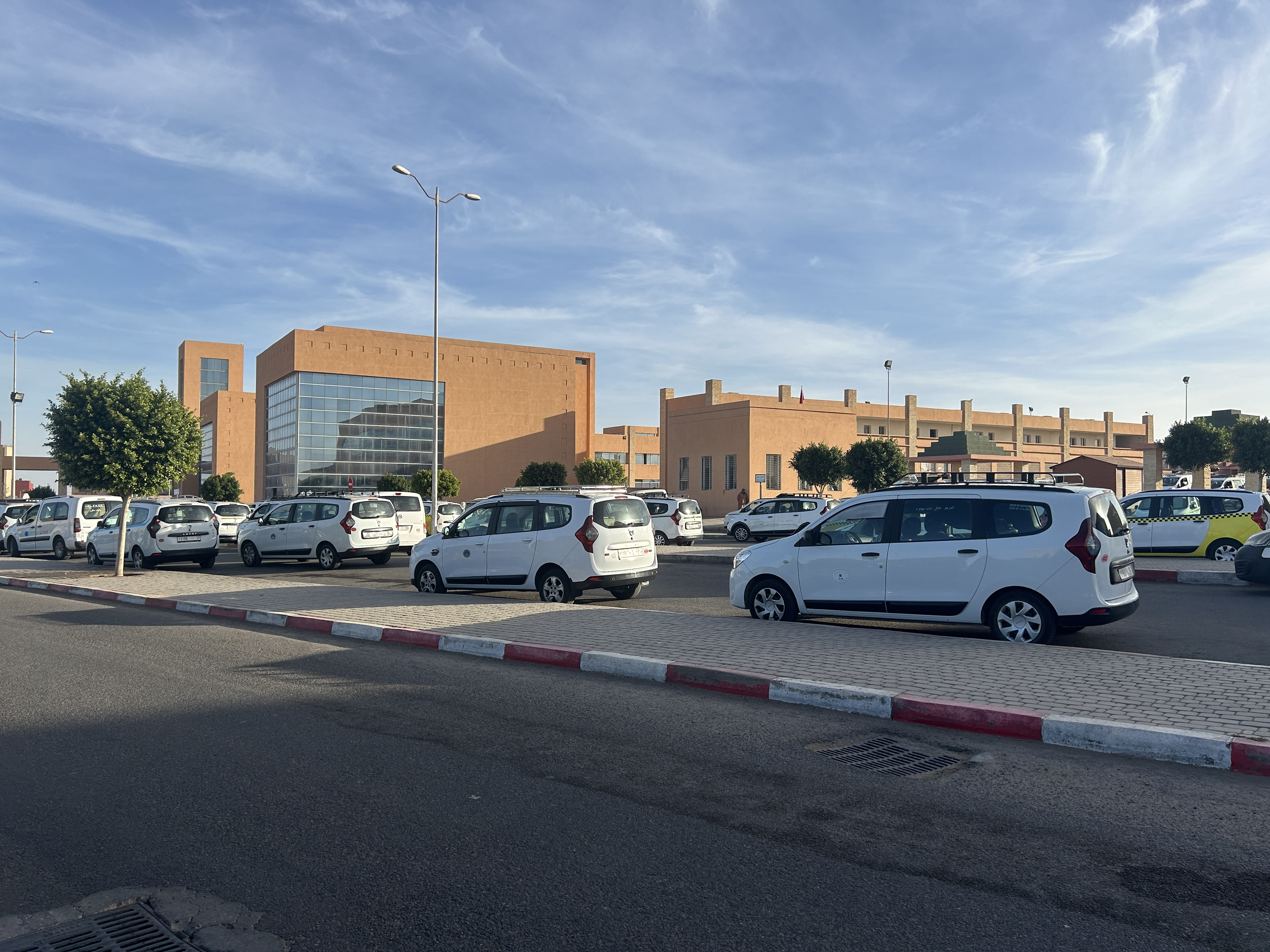
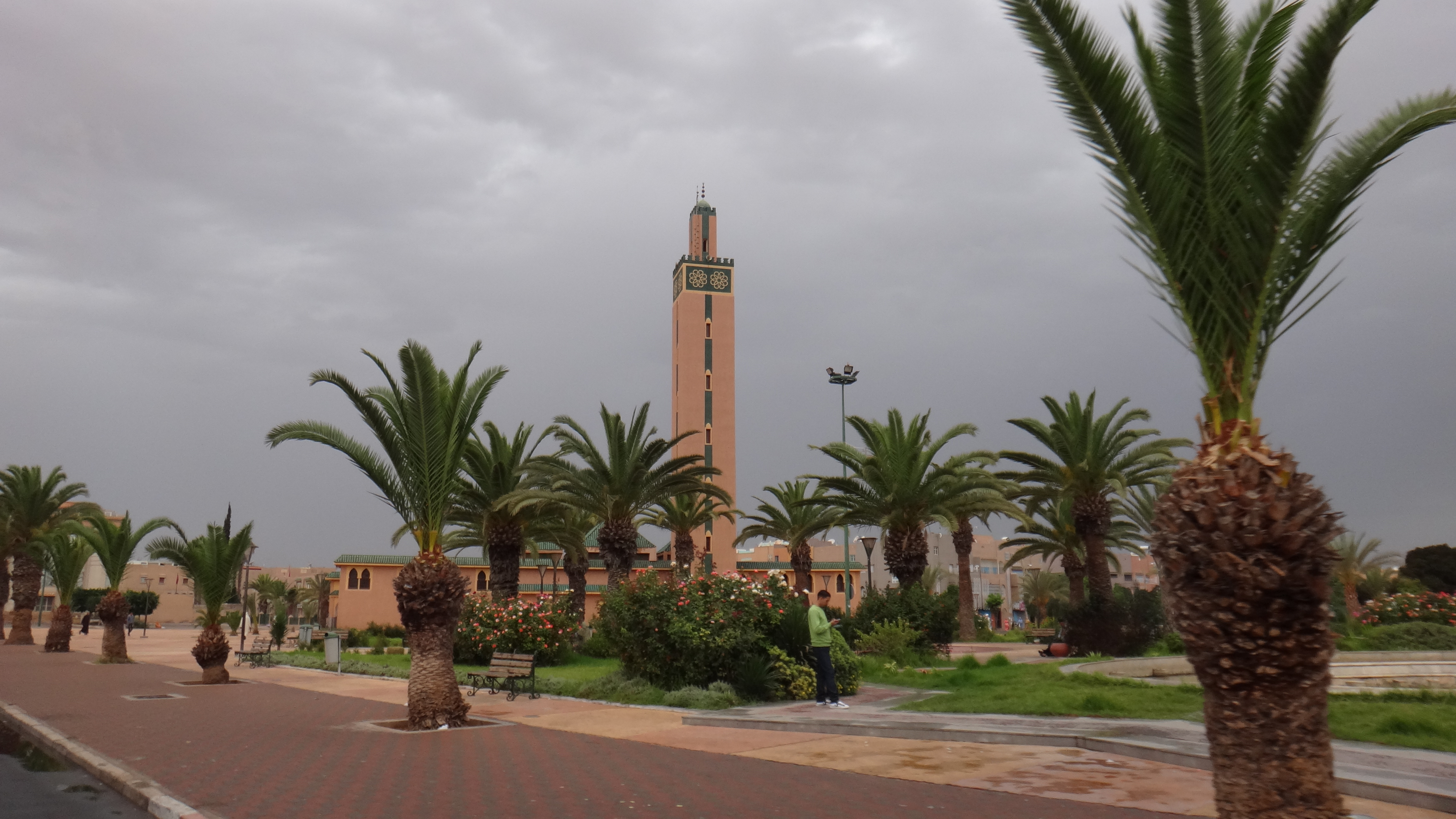
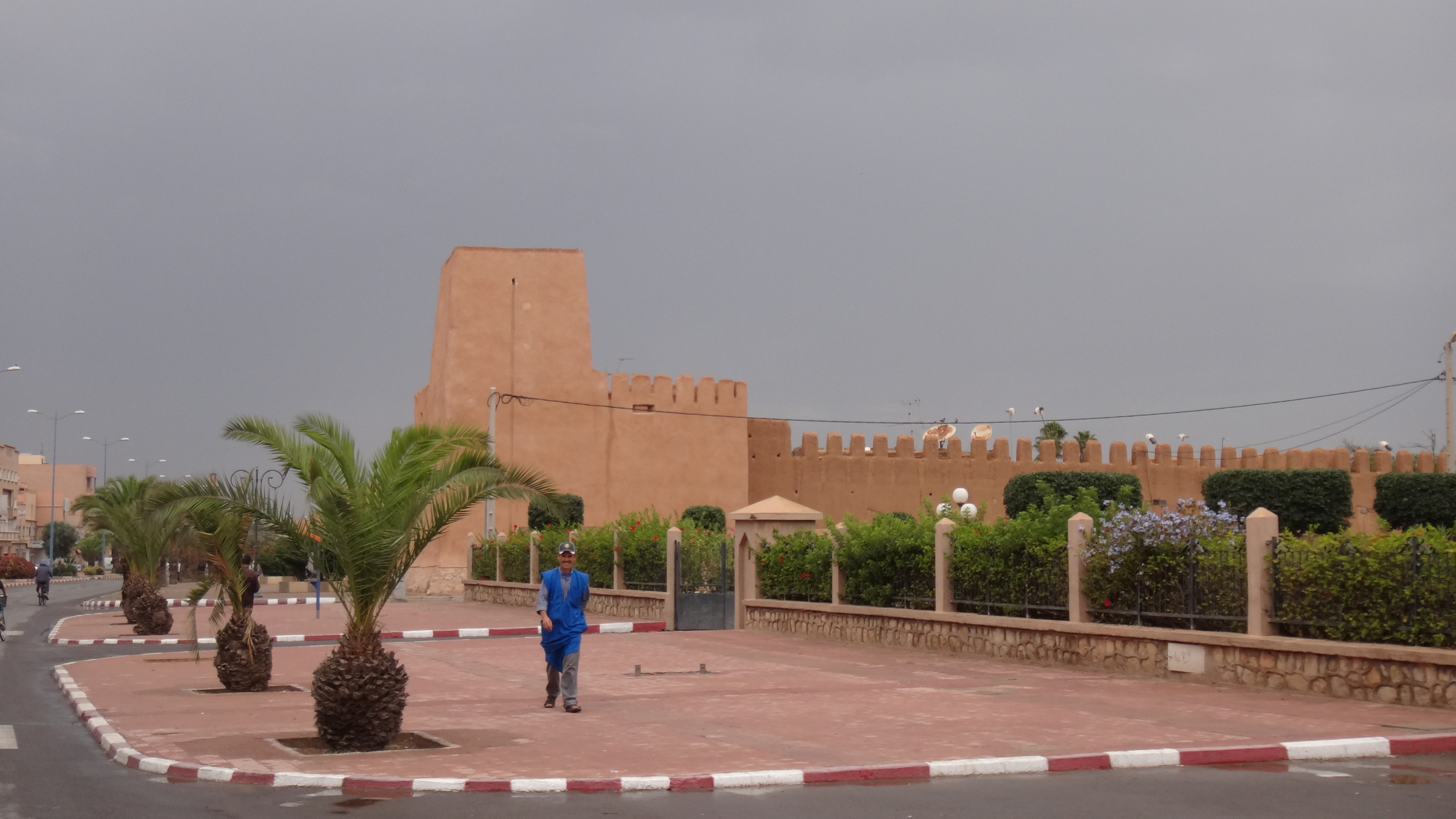

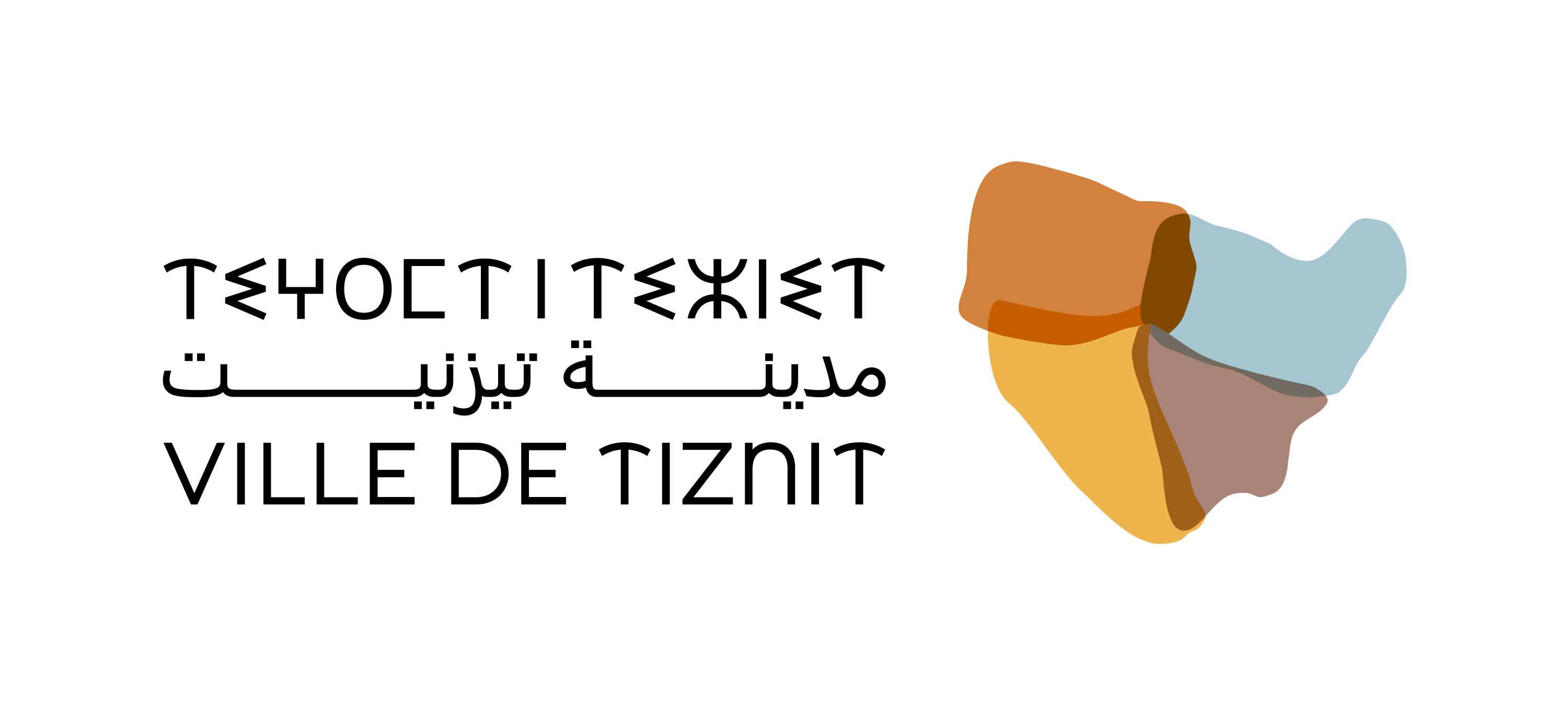
- Logo
- Interactive map of Tiznit
- Coordinates: 29°43′N 9°43′W
- Country: Morocco
- Region: Souss-Massa
- Province: Tiznit

Government
  - Mayor: Abdellah Ghazi (RNI)

Population (2014)
  - Total: 74,699
- Time zone: UTC+0 (GMT)
- Website: tiznit.ma

Tiznit or Tiznet (Tachelhit: ⵜⵉⵣⵏⵉⵜ, Arabic: تزنيت, romanized: Tiznīt) is a town in the Moroccan region of Souss-Massa, founded in 1881 by Alawi Sultan Hassan I. It is the capital of Tiznit Province and recorded a population of 74,699 in the 2014 Moroccan census. The name means ‘Basket’ in Berber.

In 2026, the Living Heritage Centre in the medina of Tiznit, designed by Studio Salima Naji Architects, won the "Dialogue with Existing Cultural Landscape" category for its integration into its heritage setting and use of southern Morocco's earthen building traditions.

== People ==
- Léopold Justinard
- Ayyoub Bouaddi

== International relations ==
=== Twin towns – Sister cities ===
Tiznit is twinned with:

- Somerville, Massachusetts, United States (2010)
- Saint-Denis, France
