= Rkia Damsiria =

Musical artist

Rkia Damsiria رقية الدمسيرية
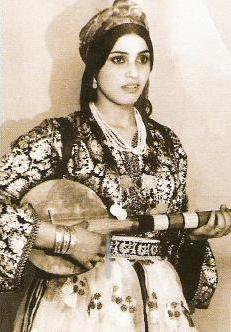
- Talbensirt

Background information
- Born: 1 January 1948 (age 78); Chichaoua, Morocco
- Occupation: Singer-poet

Rkia Damsiria (Arabic: رقية الدمسيرية; born January 1, 1948) is a Moroccan Berber singer and poet. She writes and performs in Tashelhit, her native Berber tongue.

== Biography ==
Rkia Chewal or Damsiria was born in 1948 in Demsira, a region/tribe near Imintanoute, Morocco. She had a difficult childhood because she lost her mother at the age of 4, was maltreated by her father's wife and forced to marry. Soon after, she fled to the city of Casablanca before she turned 14.

While in Casablanca, she started singing and her beginning was in the middle of 1960s with some of the most popular Amazigh rwaiss artists at that time such as Mohamed Demsiri and Said Achtouk. She recorded her first album in 1967 and soon after, she became very popular in Morocco and among Moroccans in Europe.

== Concert tour ==
She participated in several national festivals in Morocco such as Timitar.

== Discography ==
Rkia Damsiria has a rich discography with around 800 songs.

== See also ==
- Shilha language
- Fatima Tabaamrant
- Aicha Tachinwit
