= Fatima Tihihit =

Moroccan singer

Fatima Tihihit ⴼⴰⵟⵉⵎⴰ ⵜⵉⵃⵉⵃⵉⵜ
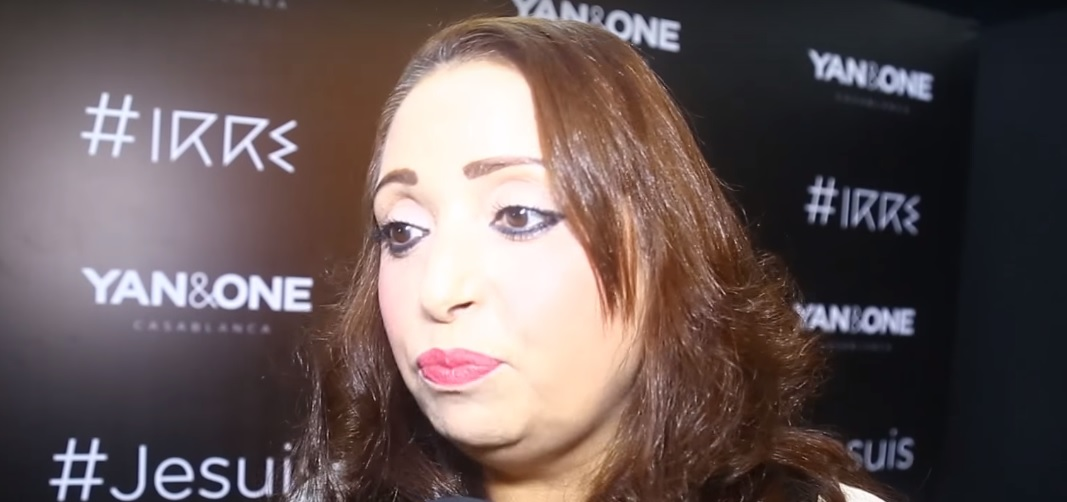
- Fatima Tihihit in 2017

Background information
- Born: Fatima Banou; 1969 (age 56–57); Tamanar, Morocco
- Genres: Tachelhit (Berber of Sous)
- Occupations: Singer, musician

Fatima Banou (in Berber:ⴼⴰⵟⵉⵎⴰ ⴱⴰⵏⵓ – born in Tamanar in 1969), also known as Raissa Tihihit Mzzin (Little Tihihit), is a Moroccan singer in the Amazigh Tachelhit dialect.

== Childhood ==
Fatima Banou was born in 1969 in Tamanar, in the region of Essaouira, in Morocco, in a family having 7 children. She had 3 brothers and 3 sisters. Fatima was forced to marry at the age of 8 by her parents, and could not live with an adult husband at the age. She divorced and was married to her cousin, but that marriage ended also, and by the age of 15 she was a single mother of her daughter.

== Career ==
Raissa Fatima Tihihit started her musical career in 1983, when she engaged in the troop of the Raiss (master) Lhaj Mohamed Albensir. In 1986, she formed her own group and collaborated with famous masters such as Lhaj Omar Wahrouch and Ait Bounsir. Fatima Tihihit gave several concerts both in Morocco and internationally, where she performed as part of different tours (including France, Indonesia, USA, UAE, Saudi Arabia).

Fatima Tihihit is also an actress and participated in several series and films on Moroccan television.

== See also ==
- Tashelhit
- Omar Wahrouch
- Fatima Tabaamrant
