= Mohammed El Moustaoui =

Moroccan poet and songwriter

- Born: محمد مستاوي; 1943 (age 82–83)

Mohamed El Moustaoui or Moustaoui (born 1943) is a Moroccan poet and songwriter in Tachelhit.

== Biography ==
Mohamed was born in 1943 in Mekzert, a small village in Souss. He studied in Taroudant and Marrakesh. He was correspondent for the Al Ittihad Al Ichtiraki, the official newspaper of the USFP party.

He was one of the first modern writers to write in Tamazight.

In 2003, he retired from university teaching.

== Bibliography ==
- Chains (Iskraf) in 1976;
- Laughter and crying (Tadsa d imttawen) in 1979;
- Dancing scene (asays) in 1988;
- The waves (taddangiwin) in 1998;
- The old have said (nnan willi zrinin) 1980;
- Abouch in parliament in 1983;
- Lights (tifawin) in 1985;
- Testimonies and poem of fire rrays El Haj Mohamed Demsiri in 1998;
- Rrays El Haj Belaid: his life in a few poems in 1996;
- Poems of rrays Said Achtouk (the poet Said Achtouk, (-1989)) (published in collaboration with Ahmed Assid) in 1998.

== See also ==
- Omar Wahrouch
