= Sidi Ahmed Ou Moussa =

Sidi Ahmed Ou Moussa may refer to:

- Sidi Ahmed Ou Moussa (village), a small town and rural commune in Tiznit Province, Morocco
- Sidi Ahmed Ou Moussa (saint), marabout, Muslim saint and spiritual leader of Tazerwalt in the Sous region of Morocco
