= Said Achtouk =

Said Achtouk ⵙⴰⵄⵉⴷ ⴰⵛⵜⵓⴽ
- Born: 1925; Chtouka, Morocco
- Died: September 7, 1989 (aged 63–64) Rabat, Morocco
- Occupation: Singer-songwriter

Said Achtouk (1925 – September 7, 1989) was a Moroccan singer-poet (ṛṛays) and songwriter. He wrote and sang in Tashelhit.

== Biography ==
Said Bizrane or Achtouk was born in the village of Bizourane, part of Idaou-Bouzia which is one of the renowned tribes of Chtouka. Thus, his artistic name Achtouk which means "from Chtouka" in Tachelhit.

He started singing and writing poems early in life while participating in traditional dancing celebrations called Ajmak. He was inspired by many Shilha artists such as Lhaj Belaid, Anchad and Boudraa.

His professional career started officially when he met Ahmed Amentag in 1958 after which he founded his musical band including artists such as Fatima Tabaamrant and Rkia Damsiria.

Achtouk died on September 7, 1989, in Rabat.

== Legacy ==
Said Achtouk wrote several songs treating several social, cultural and political topics. Some of his famous poems and songs are:

- A yamarg
- Diaman
- A llayhnik
- Likamt
- Lawsaf n zin
- Tamadont
- Rwah anmon

The cultural center in Biougra is named after him for his contributions to art and culture locally and nationally.

== Private life ==
Said Achtouk was married and the father of Mohamed Bizrane, a famous Moroccan surgeon, specialized in urology and sports medicine. He was a football enthusiast and president of Biougra football club.

== See also ==
- Omar Wahrouch
- Mohamed Demsiri
