= Ahmed Amentag =

Ahmed Amentag ⴰⵃⵎⴰⴷ ⴰⵎⵏⵜⴰⴳ
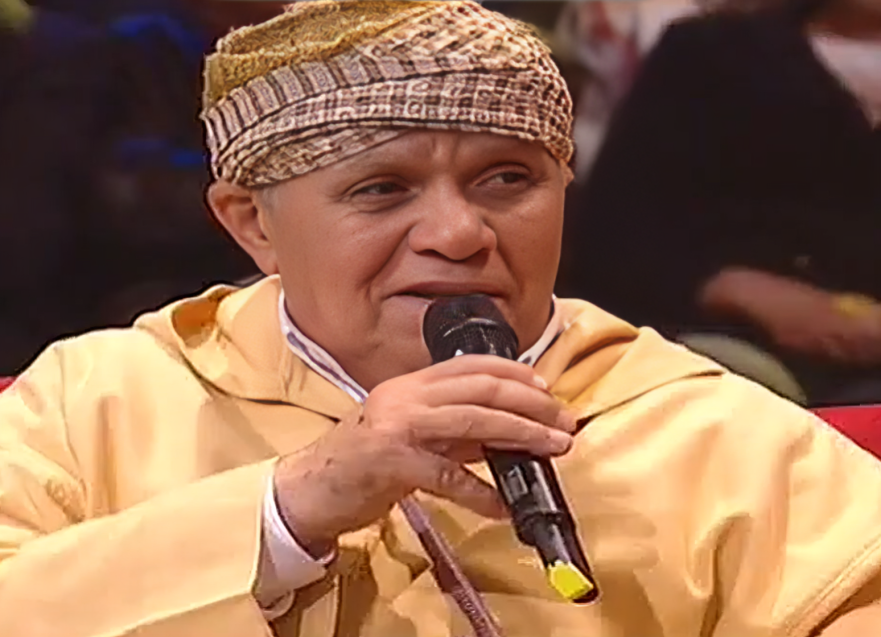

Background information
- Born: 1927; Tamsoult, Morocco
- Died: 24 November 2015 Dcheira El Jihadia, Morocco
- Occupation: Singer-songwriter
- Instruments: Voice, Rebab

Ahmed Amentag (1927 – November 24, 2015) was a Moroccan singer-poet (ṛṛays) and songwriter in Tashelhit.

== Biography ==
Ahmed Amentag was born in the village of Mentaga near Taroudant. Thus, his artistic name was Amentag which means "from Mentaga" in Tachelhit.

After leaving the madrasa in Taroudant at age 17, he joined a group of rways to play ribab for them. A few years later, he decided to found his own group of then-famous rways such as Lhadj Belaid, Omar Wahrouch, and Mohamed Demsiri.

During the 1950s, he was a famous rays and toured in France, Germany and Belgium. He made his first music recording during the later 1960s in Paris.

== Legacy ==
Ahmed Amentag authored several famous poems and songs such as:

- Bou salem
- Bou chahwa
- Imik ayga zin

The national festival of rways in 2017 was dedicated to him for his contributions to the musical art of rways.

== Death ==
Ahmed Amentag fell sick during his last years and died on Tuesday, November 24, 2015, in Dcheira El Jihadia, Morocco.

== See also ==
- Lhadj Belaid
- Omar Wahrouch
- Mohamed Demsiri
