= Lhaj Belaid =

Lhaj Belaid ⵍⵃⴰⵊⵊ ⴱⵍⵄⵉⴷ
- Also known as: Rays Belaid
- Born: Muhammed Belaid; 1873; Ouijjane, Morocco
- Died: January 1, 1945 (aged 71–72)
- Genres: Tachelhit (Berber of Sous)
- Occupations: Singer, musician
- Instruments: Voice, Rebab

Mohamed Belaid (1873 – 1945), widely known as Rays Lhaj Belaid, was a Moroccan singer-poet (ṛṛays) and rebab player. He sang in Tachelhit. He is considered to be one of the first essential figures of rways (plural of rays), poetry and rebab players in the musical tradition of Shilha people (also known as chleuh).

== Biography ==
Lhaj Belaid was born around 1873 in a small village near Ouijjane, but he lived most of his life travelling in the region of Souss. His father died when he was child and student in the local madrasa. He quit study and started to work as a shepherd in his village.

Lhaj Belaid started playing flute when he was a shepherd. He continued singing and playing with his rebab until he left for the Sufi town of Tazerwalt to learn more about poetry. Later, he joined a musical group where he played rebab and became increasing popular.

In 1937, he was one of the first Moroccan artists to be invited to record his music for the French Pathé-Marconi in Paris.

== Legacy ==
Lhaj Belaid was a prolific poet and singer treating several social, cultural and political topics. Some of his famous poems and songs are:

- Mqqar tlla tuga / Taliwin
- Aṭbib (the doctor)
- Lḥassani
- Ljuhr (the jewelry)
- Ṣṣbeṛ (Patience)
- Lhna (Peace)
- Lmakina (the Machine)
- Lḥijj (the pilgrimage)
- Iɣ istara uḍar inu
- Atbir umlil (the white Pigeon)
- Isa ukan txmmamɣ

== Death ==
In the early 1940s, Lhaj Belaid suddenly disappeared from the musical scene and is believed to have died between 1943 and 1948 (most likely 1945) in a small village in the region of Souss.

== See also ==
- Omar Wahrouch
- Said Achtouk
- Fatima Tabaamrant
