= Ifenakaren =

Human settlement in Morocco

Ifenakaren is a place in Tiznit Province, Morocco, owned by the family of Afnakar, who have many lands there and it is named by their own family name "Afnakar". Ifenakaren means ""the Afnakar".

Ifenakarn is located in 29°24′59″N 9°44′14″W.

Ifenakaren is known also for its argan oil and olive oil which has a good quality.
