= Mohammed Mokhtar Soussi =

Mohammed al-Mokhtar Soussi
- محمد المختار السوسي
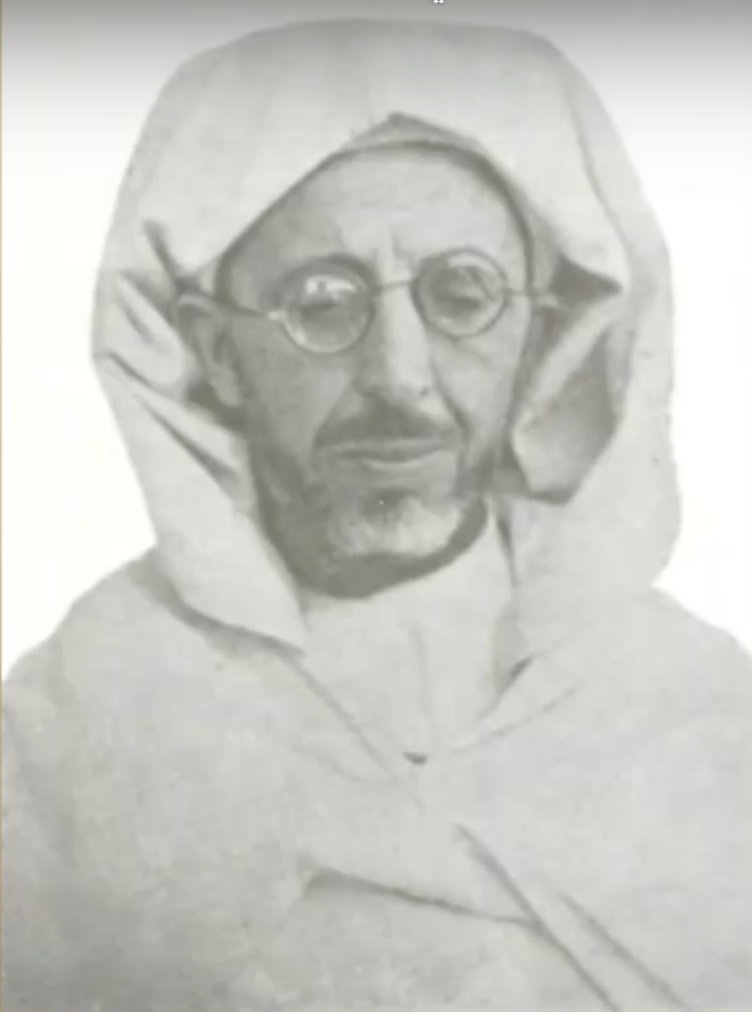

Mohammed al-Mokhtar Soussi (Arabic: محمد المختار السوسي, romanized: Muḥammad al-Mukhtār al-Sūsī; 1900–1963) was a Moroccan scholar, politician and writer who played an important role in the years before Morocco's independence in 1956. Born in the village of Illigh (close to Tafraout), he was a soufi and an expert on the history of the Sous region and the founder of a school in Marrakesh. From 1956 to 1963 he was minister of religious affairs and member of the Crown Council in the government of Mohammed V.

== Works ==
- L'encyclopédie Al Maâssoul (Le mielleux).
- El Illighiat (Memories of exile).
- Erramliat (collection of poems).
- Souss El Alima (history)
- El Maassoul:Tarajim (people of Souss)
- A travers Jazoula : travels
- Camp du Sud: poetry (manuscript)

== See also ==
- Mohammed El Moustaoui
- Mohammed Awzal
