= Lahoucine Ibourka =

Moroccan Amazigh actor

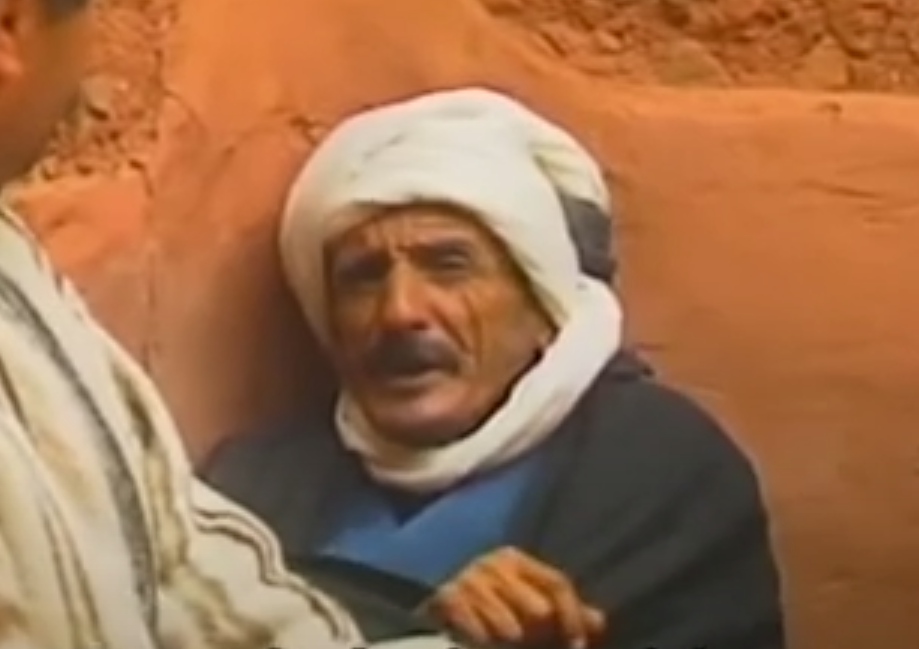
- Lahoucine Ibourka as Da Hmad in the film Boutfounaste.
- Born: الحسين إبوركا; 1938; Arbaa Rasmouka, Morocco
- Died: 3 July 1999 (aged 60–61); Marrakesh, Morocco
- Other name: Da Hmad
- Citizenship: Morocco

Lahoucine Ibourka (in Arabic: الحسين إبوركا) (1938, Arbaa Rasmouka – 3 July 1999, Marrakesh ) also known as Da Hmad, in reference to the name of the character he played in a film, was a Moroccan actor performing in Tachelhit.

== Biography ==
Lahoucine Ibourka was born in 1938 in Douar Ait Brahim Youssef, a small Moroccan town in Arbaa Rasmouka. His early career started in the Jemaa el-Fnaa, where he worked with comedians and story-tellers before being noticed and becoming a professional actor. He became widely famous for his role of Da Hmad in the film Boutfounaste, which was shot in the 1990s.

== Films ==
Lahoucine Ibourka participated in few films but all of which earned him respect in Morocco and abroad. His first official appearance, together with actors such as Mohammed Abaamrane, was in the film Boutfounaste directed by Archach Agourram. After his first successful film, he played the main character in the movie Moker, directed by Larbi Altit.

== Death ==
Lahoucine Ibourka died suddenly in Marrakesh on 3 July 1999 some time before finishing working on another film. He was a father of 9 children.

== See also ==
- Mohammed Abaamran
