= Tizoughrane =

Coordinates: 29.61108°N 9.1724°W

- Rural commune and town
- Interactive map of Tizoughrane
- Country: Morocco
- Region: Souss-Massa-Drâa
- Province: Tiznit Province

Population (2004)
  - Total: 6,250
- Time zone: UTC+0 (GMT)

Tizoughrane is a small town and rural commune in Tiznit Province of the Souss-Massa-Drâa region of Morocco. At the time of the 2004 census, the commune had a total population of 6,250 people living in 1,379 households.
