= Sidi Zouine =

Sidi Zouine: سيدي الزوين (Arabic); ]ⵙⵉⴷⵉ ⵡⵧⵓⵉⵏⴻ (Berber languages)
- Rural commune and town
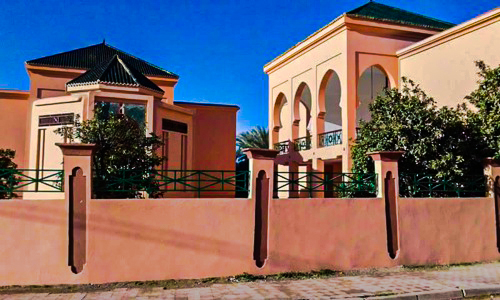
- Sidi Zouine School for preservation of the Holy Quran science and the history.

- Location within Morocco Location within Africa
- Coordinates: 31°40′14″N 8°21′03″W
- Country: Morocco
- Region: Marrakech-safi
- Prefecture: Marrakech
- Established: 1825
- Founder: Sheikh Mohammed bin Ali

Population
  - Total: 10,067
- Time zone: UTC+0 (GMT)

Sid Zouine (in Arabic: سيدي الزوين) is the urban center of the rural commune of Sid Zouine of the prefecture of Marrakech, in the Marrakech-Safi region, Morocco.

== History ==
Sidi Zouine is a rural commune named "Sidi Zouine" after Sheikh Mohammed bin Ali (nicknamed "Balzuin") founder of the antique school in 1245 Hijri 1825 AD. The school received attention under the late King Hassan II and was known for his reforms. The Ministry of Foreign Affairs has expanded its facilities to accommodate students from all over the Kingdom who wish to preserve the Quran and its information. Given the geographical proximity of the city of Marrakech, Sidi Zouin is like "Manama" in which the inhabitants work in Marrakech by day and settle in at night, where it has become a strategic location for the stability of Marrakesh citizens.

=== Sidi Zouine School ===
Sidi Zouine School was established under the reign of Sultan Hassan I. It is one of the few schools in the Muslim world studying the readings of the 7th and 10th Quran.

School graduates have become mosque imams in Morocco, other places in Africa, and Europe.

== Demographics ==
The population of Sidi Zouine increased from 8,023 inhabitants in 1994 to 10,067 in 2004 (years of the last censuses).

== See also ==
- Chichaoua
- Imintanut
- Sid L Mukhtar
