= Arbaa Ait Ahmed =

Coordinates: 29.810459°N 9.33275°W

- Rural commune and town
- Interactive map of Arbaa Ait Ahmed
- Country: Morocco
- Region: Souss-Massa-Drâa
- Province: Tiznit Province

Population (2004)
  - Total: 8,228
- Time zone: UTC+0 (GMT)

Arbaa Ait Ahmed is a small town and rural commune in Tiznit Province of the Souss-Massa-Drâa region of Morocco. At the time of the 2004 census, the commune had a total population of 8228 people living in 1516 households.
