= Bounaamane =

Coordinates: 29.528299°N 9.8044°W

- Rural commune and town
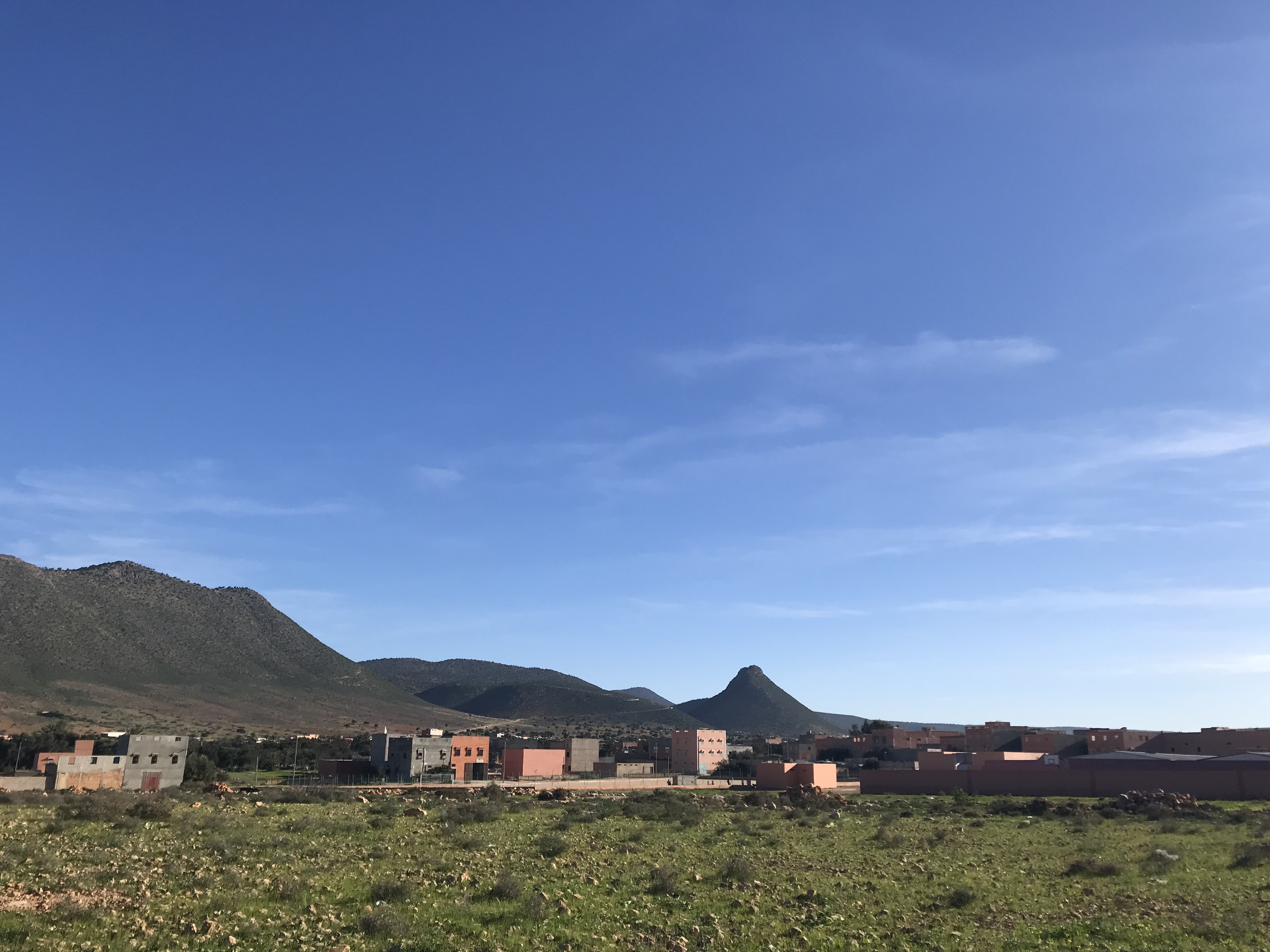
- Bounaamane, viewed looking towards Tigoudern
- Interactive map of Bounaamane
- Country: Morocco
- Region: Souss-Massa-Drâa
- Province: Tiznit Province

Population (2004)
  - Total: 12,112
- Time zone: UTC+0 (GMT)

Bounaamane is a small town and rural commune in Tiznit Province of the Souss-Massa-Drâa region of Morocco. At the time of the 2004 census, the commune had a total population of 12,112 people living in 2,158 households. The area is predominantly Amazigh.

The town has a library, Dar Talib, Dar Taliba, and several associations. There are also several cafes, small food and clothing stores, and a driving school. The Dar Saniaa is a local women's association that offers sewing, Arabic, and English classes. There is a centrally located mosque and many in surrounding neighborhoods. The mosques also offer women's literacy courses.

Several small businesses and cooperatives producing olive oil and argan oil are located in Bounaamane and the surrounding villages.

== History ==
A well-known Koranic school was founded in Bounaamaane in between the 14th and 15th century (7th and 8th Hijri centuries) and is still functioning today.

During French colonialism, a mountain on the outskirts of Bounaamane served as a garrison.

Bounaamane is also home to religious and cultural activities, such as tbourida during Ashura and special occasions.

== Geography ==
Bounaamane is situated 23 kilometers south of Tiznit and 90 kilometers south of Agadir.

It is in a valley surrounded by hills and mountains. A river once ran through the outskirts of Bounaamane but has dried up in the 21st century. This ongoing drought has severely impacted the area.

Argan and olive trees are indigenous to the region and grow abundantly in the area.

== Demographics ==
Like much of the Souss-Massa region, Bounaamane is predominantly Amazigh, with a small number of Arabs and Sahrawis. Many from Bounaamane are a part of the Ait Brayim tribe.

== Government ==
The commune of Bounaamane is located on the main street.

The day-to-day running of the commune is the responsibility of the commune president, whereas the Caid is responsible for security.

== Transportation ==
Bounaamane is located south of Tiznit along Route P1903. Bounaamane is served by grand taxis and by a local bus. Construction is ongoing near Bounaamane to build a highway between Tiznit and Guelmim.

== Education ==
Bounaamane's public school system consists of an elementary school and Ibn Khaldoun High School.

There is also a Koranic school which is well known in the area.

Students from outside of Bounaamane can board at the Dar Talib and Dar Taliba in town. The Dar Talib and Dar Taliba can accommodate several hundred students, and each comprises dormitories, a cafeteria, computer lab, library, a front office, football terrain, and classrooms. Both have football teams that have had national success.

== Points of Interest ==
- Tigoudern, a prominent mountain located on the outskirts of Bounaamane in the Imougni Oufella neighborhood. It is a short but steep hike to the top, where a small structure and the remnants of several others can be found. The mountain was previously used as a garrison.
- Souk – Friday mornings through late afternoon.
