= Ammelne =

Coordinates: 29.795746°N 8.954965°W

Ammelne ⴰⵎⵍⵏ املن
- Rural commune and town
- Interactive map of Ammelne
- Country: Morocco
- Region: Souss-Massa-Drâa
- Province: Tiznit Province

Population (2004)
  - Total: 4,281
- Time zone: UTC+0 (GMT)

Ammelne is a small town and rural commune in Tiznit Province of the Souss-Massa-Drâa region of Morocco. At the time of the 2004 census, the commune had a total population of 4281 people living in 1281 households.
