= El Maader El Kabir =

Coordinates: 29.850235°N 9.657515°W

- Rural commune and town
- Interactive map of El Maader El Kabir
- Country: Morocco
- Region: Souss-Massa-Drâa
- Province: Tiznit Province

Population (2004)
  - Total: 7,918
- Time zone: UTC+0 (GMT)

El Maader El Kabir is a small town and rural commune in Tiznit Province of the Souss-Massa-Drâa region of Morocco. At the time of the 2004 census, the commune had a total population of 7,918 people living in 1,595 households.
