= Irigh N'Tahala =

Coordinates: 29.668695°N 9.062855°W

- Rural commune and town
- Interactive map of Irigh N'Tahala
- Country: Morocco
- Region: Souss-Massa-Drâa
- Province: Tiznit Province

Population (2004)
  - Total: 1,992
- Time zone: UTC+0 (GMT)

Irigh N'Tahala is a small town and rural commune in Tiznit Province of the Souss-Massa-Drâa region of Morocco. At the time of the 2004 census, the commune had a total population of 1,992 people living in 583 households.

The climate is tropical. The average temperature is 21 °C. The hottest month is July, at 31 °C, and the coldest is January, at 10 °C. The average rainfall is 263 mm per year. The wettest month is November, with 106 mm of rain, and the driest is July, with 1 mm.
