= Arbaa Sahel =

Coordinates: 29.599344°N 9.87699°W

- Rural commune and town
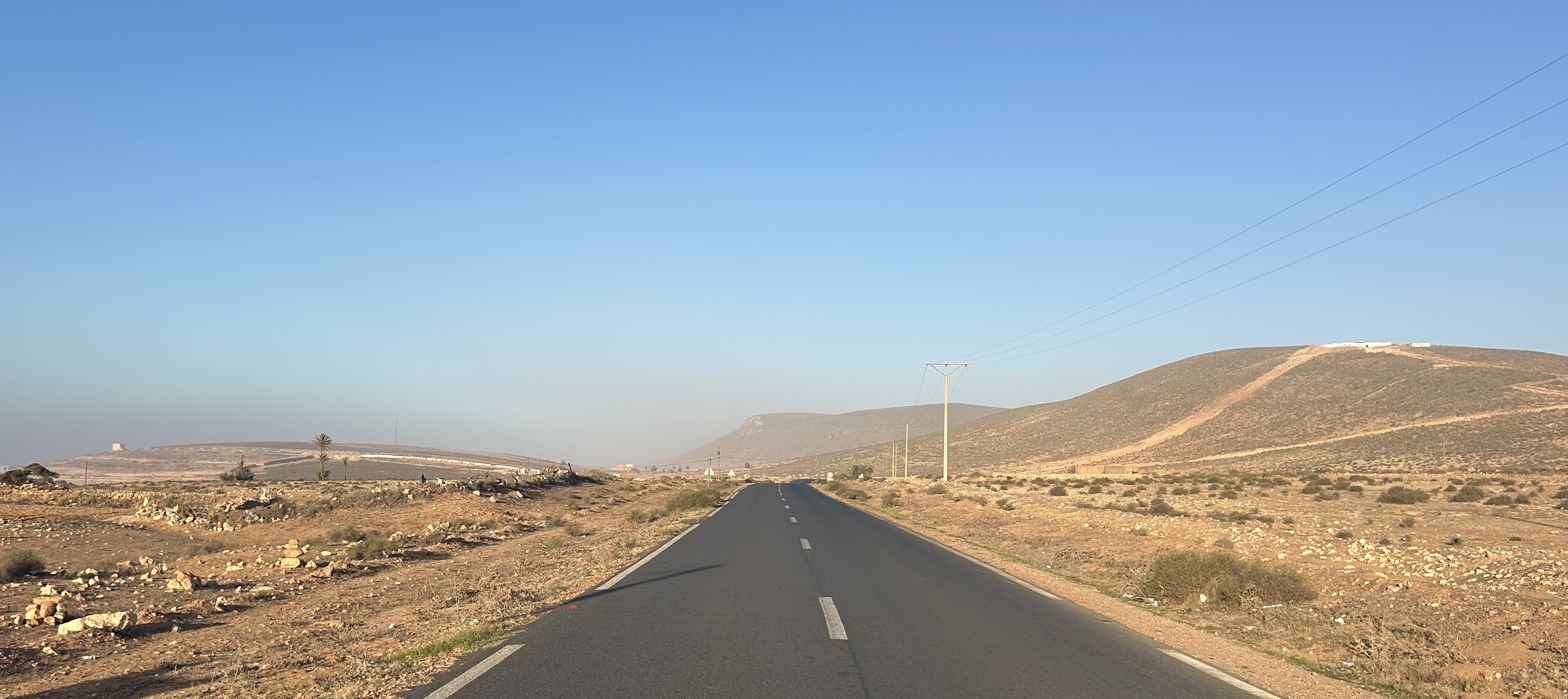
- Interactive map of Arbaa Sahel
- Country: Morocco
- Region: Souss-Massa
- Province: Tiznit Province

Population (2004)
  - Total: 12,944
- Time zone: UTC+0 (GMT)

Arbaa Sahel is a small town and rural commune in Tiznit Province of the Souss-Massa region of Morocco. At the time of the 2004 census, the commune had a total population of 12944 people living in 2585 households.
