= Tamanar =

Coordinates: 31°00′N 9°40′W

- Town
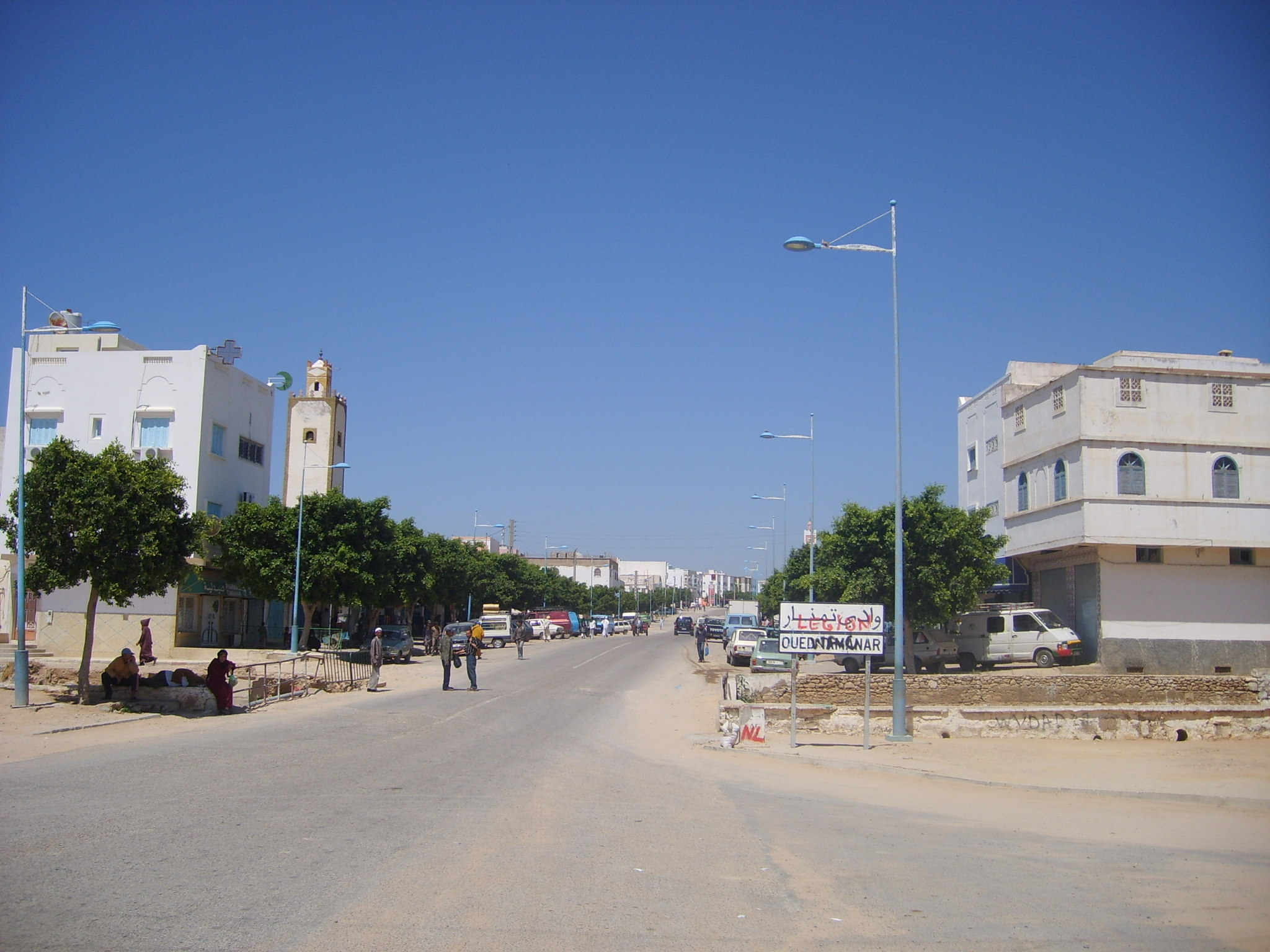
- Main road in Tamanar
- Interactive map of Tamanar
- Country: Morocco
- Region: Marrakesh-Safi
- Province: Essaouira
- Elevation: 225 m (738 ft)

Population (2004)
  - Total: 9,984
- Time zone: UTC+0 (GMT)

Tamanar (Berber languages: tamanar, ⵜⴰⵎⴰⵏⴰⵔ pronounced [tæ.mæ.nær] is a rural municipality in Essaouira Province, Marrakesh-Safi, Morocco.

According to the 2004 census it has a population of 9,984.

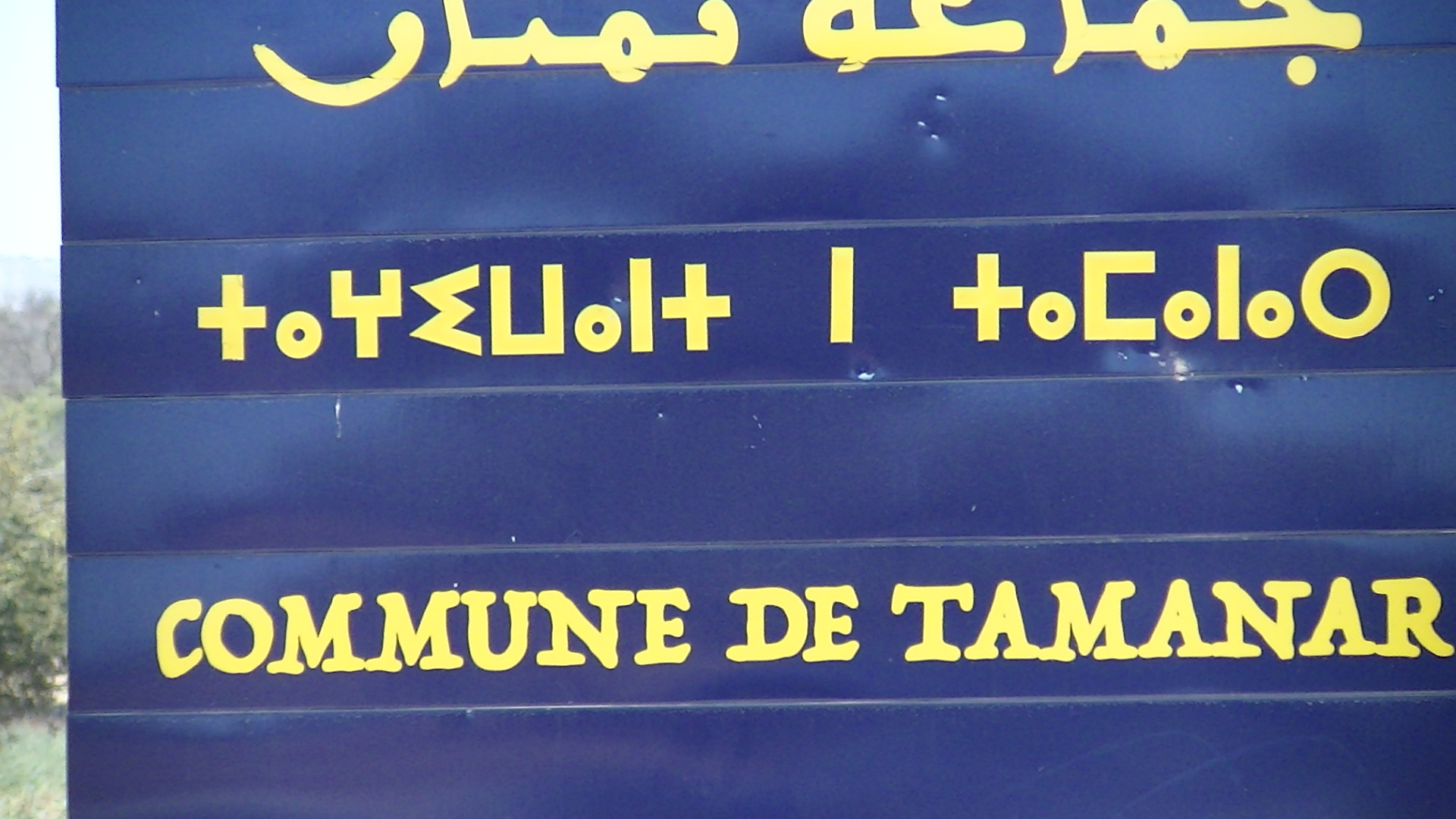

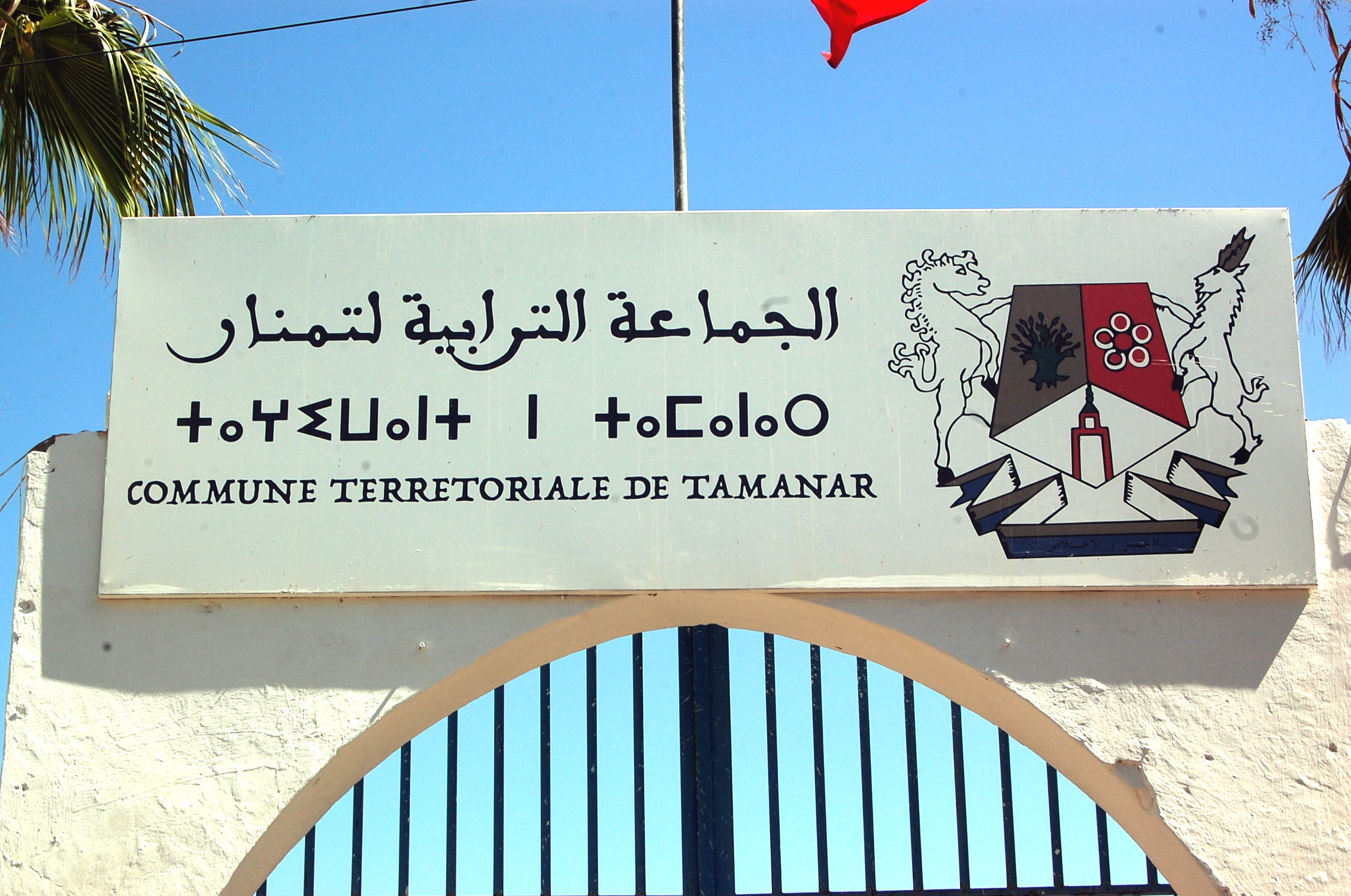

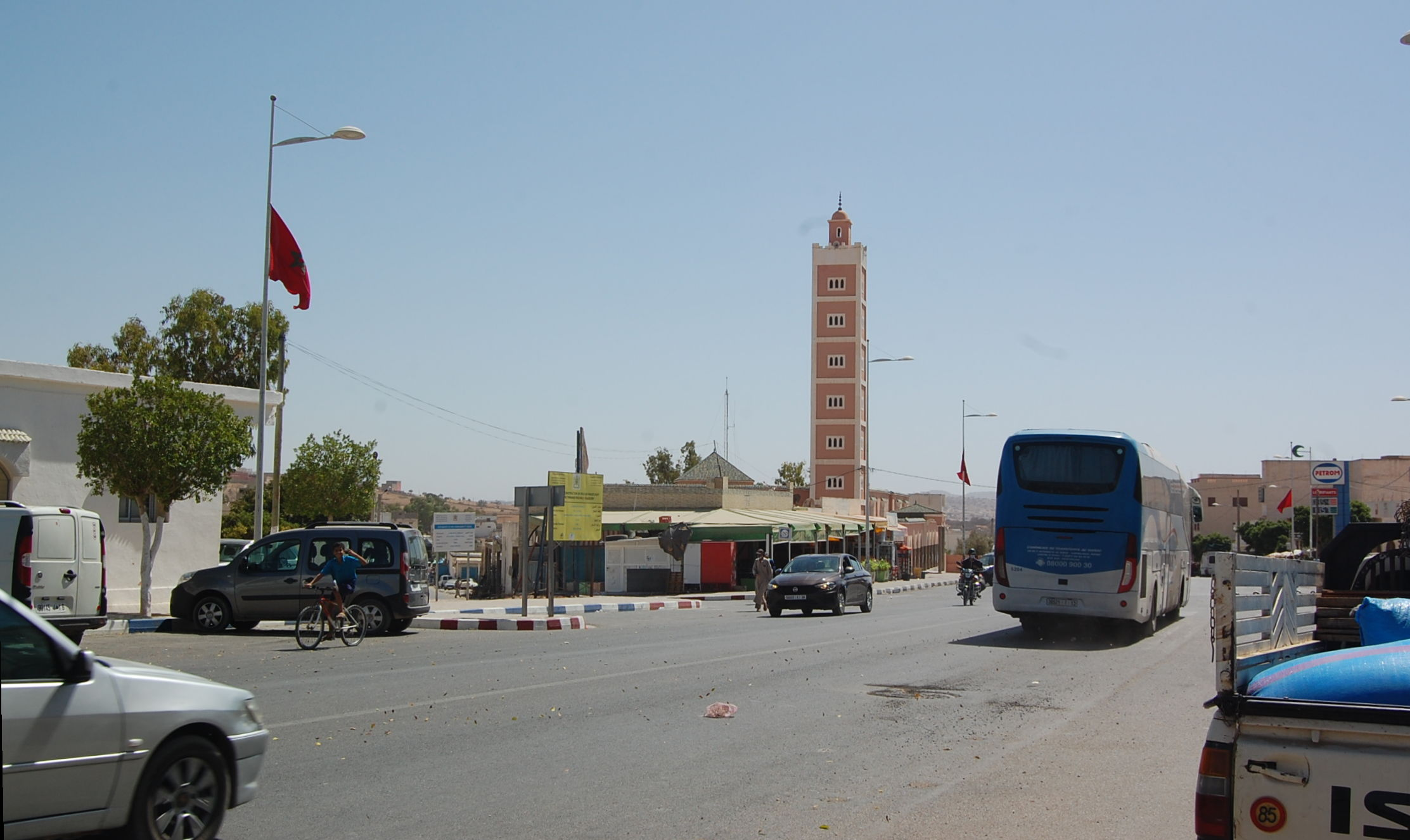

== Notable people ==
- Fatima Tihihit, Moroccan singer in Tachelhit amazigh language.
