= Tnine Aday =

Coordinates: 29.748199°N 9.23719°W

- Rural commune and town
- Interactive map of Tnine Aday
- Country: Morocco
- Region: Souss-Massa-Drâa
- Province: Tiznit Province

Population (2004)
  - Total: 2,734
- Time zone: UTC+0 (GMT)

Tnine Aday is a small town and rural commune in Tiznit Province of the Souss-Massa-Drâa region of Morocco. At the time of the 2004 census, the commune had a total population of 2,734 people living in 558 households.
