= Tafraout El Mouloud =

Coordinates: 29.7103°N 9.20793°W

- Rural commune and town
- Interactive map of Tafraout El Mouloud
- Country: Morocco
- Region: Souss-Massa-Drâa
- Province: Tiznit Province

Population (2004)
  - Total: 3,619
- Time zone: UTC+0 (GMT)

Tafraout El Mouloud is a small town and rural commune in Tiznit Province of the Souss-Massa-Drâa region of Morocco. At the time of the 2004 census, the commune had a total population of 3,619 people living in 757 households.
