= Anzi, Morocco =

Coordinates: 29.656851°N 9.35208°W

Anzi ⴰⵏⵣⵉ انزي
- Rural commune and town
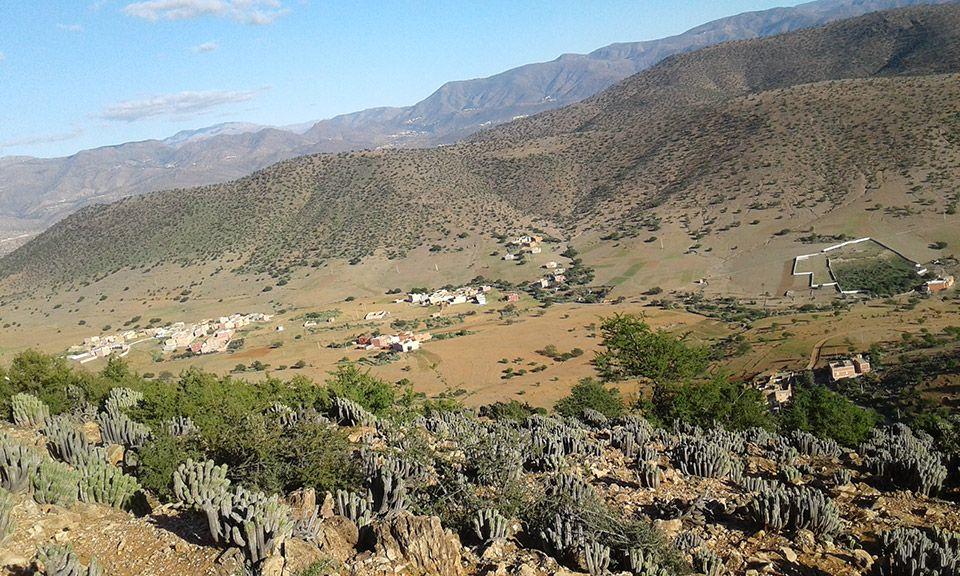
- Interactive map of Anzi
- Country: Morocco
- Region: Souss-Massa-Drâa
- Province: Tiznit Province

Population (2004)
  - Total: 6,619
- Time zone: UTC+0 (GMT)

Anzi (sometimes spelled Anezi) is a small town and rural commune in Tiznit Province of the Souss-Massa-Drâa region of Morocco, it is the center of the irsmouken tribe. At the time of the 2004 census, the commune had a total population of 6619 people living in 1223 households.
