= Afella Ighir =

Rural commune and town in Tiznit, Morocco

Coordinates: 29.5°N 8.833299°W

- Rural commune and town
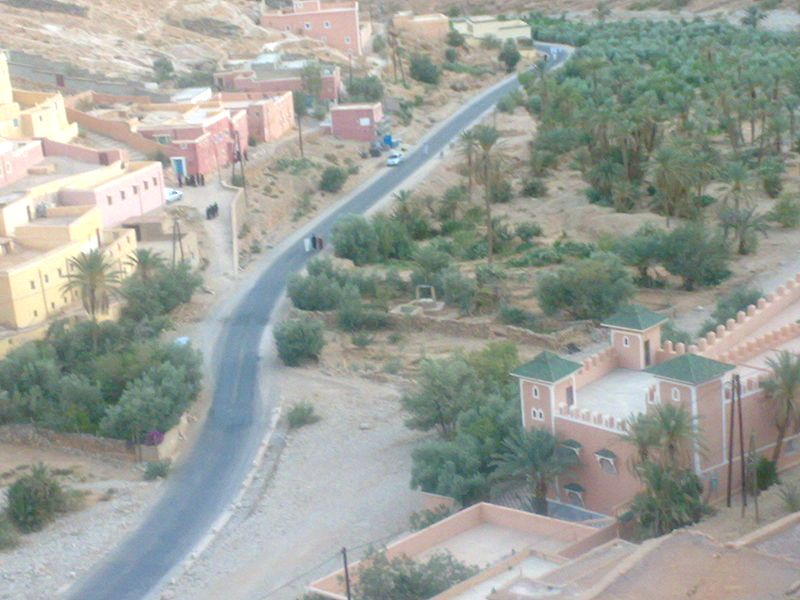
- Interactive map of Afella Ighir
- Country: Morocco
- Region: Souss-Massa-Drâa
- Province: Tiznit Province

Population (2004)
  - Total: 4,205
- Time zone: UTC+0 (GMT)

Afella Ighir is a small town and rural commune in Tiznit Province of the Souss-Massa-Drâa region of Morocco. At the time of the 2004 census, the commune had a total population of 4205 people living in 1084 households.
