= HIV/AIDS in Morocco =

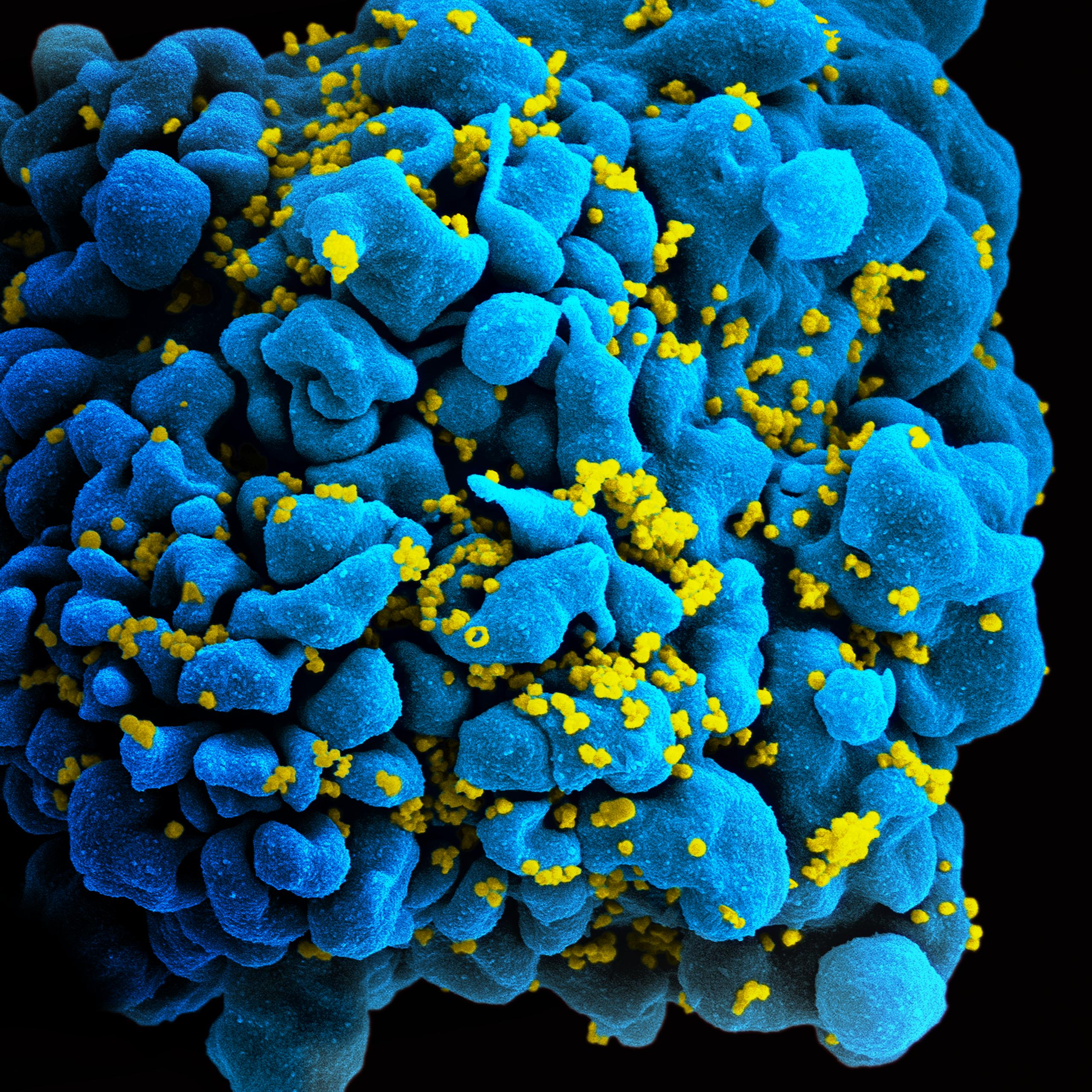
Colorized scanning electron micrograph of HIV-1 virus particles (yellow) both budding and attached to the surface of human lymphocyte cells (blue)

Morocco has been identified as one of the best countries within the MENA region in dealing with the HIV epidemic based on their research capacities, surveillance systems, and evidence-informed and comprehensive responses. While the general public has a fairly low HIV prevalence, the majority of HIV/AIDS cases can be found in three high-risk groups, which is important when deciding how to approach intervention and prevention.

== Overview ==
Of the 32 million population in Morocco, a 2009 estimate expects 26,000 are living with HIV (range of 19,000-34,000). Between 2009 and 2010, there were an estimated 3,447 new HIV infections (range: 2,500-4,400).

Within Morocco, there are three high-risk groups: female sex workers (FSWs), men who have sex with men (MSM), and injecting drug users (IDUs). The vast majority of HIV prevalence occurs within these three groups (67% of new infections), largely in part to transmission caused from unprotected sexual contact (87% of HIV/AIDS cases), while the overall Moroccan population HIV prevalence remains low at 0.14%. Heterosexual relations sit at only 7% of HIV infections. HIV/AIDS knowledge appears to be fairly high for the overall population.

Over the entire HIV epidemic, there is a growing feminization of infection. While in Morocco in 2001 women made up only 40% of people living with HIV/AIDS (PLWHA), women in 2009 made up nearly 50% of all cases. This could be due to women being more vulnerable than men to HIV infection because of women's lack of negotiation power in relationships and limited access to education for women and girls. In heterosexual relationships, 71% of women are infected by their husbands.

There were two modes of transmission (MoT) analyses done in Morocco, a national and Souss-Massa-Drâa. Considering the high mobility around the area, as Souss-Massa-Drâa is a prevalent tourist hub, it is understandable for there to be a more intense HIV epidemic present in Souss-Massa-Drâa. Both MoT models determine that direct sexual contact, without protection like a condom, is the most common transmission mode and that women and men contribute equally to HIV incidence, but most women are infected from infected spouses.

Data suggests that resources need to focus on the primary 3 high risk groups, as well as FSW clients, to terminate HIV prevalence across Morocco, as these three groups are mainly driving the epidemic.

== Female sex workers ==
While FSWs were expected to reach an endemic equilibrium at 9% based on the Souss-Massa-Drâa MoT, or 3% based on the National MoT, the past several years FSWs with HIV has remained fairly stable at around 2%, currently sitting at 1.7% based on the 2019 UNAIDS report.

In 2019, 61.1% of FSWs reported consistent condom usage, a percentage that continues to rise. This number is among the highest for FSWs across the MENA region. The most common reasoning for non-condom use by roughly 40% of FSWs is because of client objection. Overall, there is a fairly high knowledge of HIV/AIDS among the FSW community.

FSW clients are a part of the largest contribution to new infections. National MoT reports that 73% of all women are infected by their spouses, Souss-Massa-Drâa reports 57%.

== Men who have sex with men ==
MSM were expected to reach an endemic equilibrium at 14% based on the Souss-Massa-Drâa MoT, or 10% based on the National MoT. Currently HIV incidence is at 4.9% based on the 2019 UNAIDS report, and 57.7% report consistent condom usage in 2019.

== Injecting drug users ==
IDUs were expected to reach an endemic equilibrium at 14% based on the Souss-Massa-Drâa MoT, or 10% based on the National MoT. Currently HIV incidence is at 4.9% based on the 2019 UNAIDS report.

Lack of consistent condom usage is still the greatest concern for contracting HIV for IDUs. In 2019, 44.6% reported consistent condom usage, making IDUs the most likely to engage in risky sexual behavior. Contaminated needles and syringes are still of concern, however. In 2013, HIV incidence was reduced relatively among IDUs by 24-73% simply by reducing sharing needles and syringes.

== Stigma ==
There are a handful of barriers that PLWHA face. Stigma is one of the most problematic for PLWHA because of the strong association between cases of HIV/AIDS with homosexuality, sex outside of marriage, and drug use, all of which are sinful behaviors within the MENA region. PLWHA will be declined from everyday family life, community life, and the workspace because of fear of casual contact the general public has for PLWHA. HIV infection is viewed as a punishment for moral, social, and religiously unacceptable behavior. Women also tend to face more stigma than men: there is limited acceptance that the man within a couple is to blame, therefore women are shamed regardless of the situation.

The biggest issue with stigma is that it may serve as a barrier for achieving HIV prevention and care services.

== Disclosure ==
Disclosure of one's HIV status has potential benefits such as greater self-esteem, social and emotional support, greater access to HIV services, and positive effect on antiretroviral therapy (ART). Disclosure also has potential pitfalls in certain situations: family rejection, moral and/or physical violence, as well as a decline in sexual desire and performance.

Disclosure is seen as a risky process by 91% of PLWHA. Within Morocco, 62% of PLWHA voluntarily disclosed their serostatus to steady sexual partners while 38% had not. 34.25% of PLWHA viewed their disclosure as a mistake, while the vast majority of those who had disclosed their serostatus (65.75%) did not think disclosure was a mistake.

Discrimination and stigma may affect the disclosure experience: 17% of PLWHA experienced rejection after disclosure and 8.7% experienced discrimination at work. Women were found to be more likely to report regret after disclosure. Discrimination within the workplace was strongly associated with greater regret. Regret and feeling of loneliness go hand-in-hand for many PLWHA who report disclosure being a mistake. PLWHA with a lower living standard also experience more regret than those with higher living standards, in part due to an increased likelihood of experiencing material instability or risk of homelessness from rejection.

Discussing HIV-related concerns with friends and family increases the chances of telling steady sexual partners serostatus. Unfortunately, the more PLWHA felt socially excluded, the higher the likelihood they had disclosure their serostatus to their steady sexual partner.

While there are links found between disclosure and socioeconomic status, there is no direct association between disclosure and age / gender. Even now, disclosing one's HIV status is a draining concern and potentially costly process in many contexts, with non-disclosure acting as a form of protection in some instances. While inherently logical, there is no clear linkage between lack of disclosure and new HIV infections.

== Intervention ==
The Moroccan government has made noticeable steps to improve the HIV epidemic within the country. Since 1999, the government has provided ART to all eligible citizens.

There is a need to address stigma and improve access to health care, which could be achieved through linkage between the education systems, community based organizations (CBOs), and social movements. HIV care also needs to be expanded to integrate sexual health and family planning.
