= Tazerwalt =

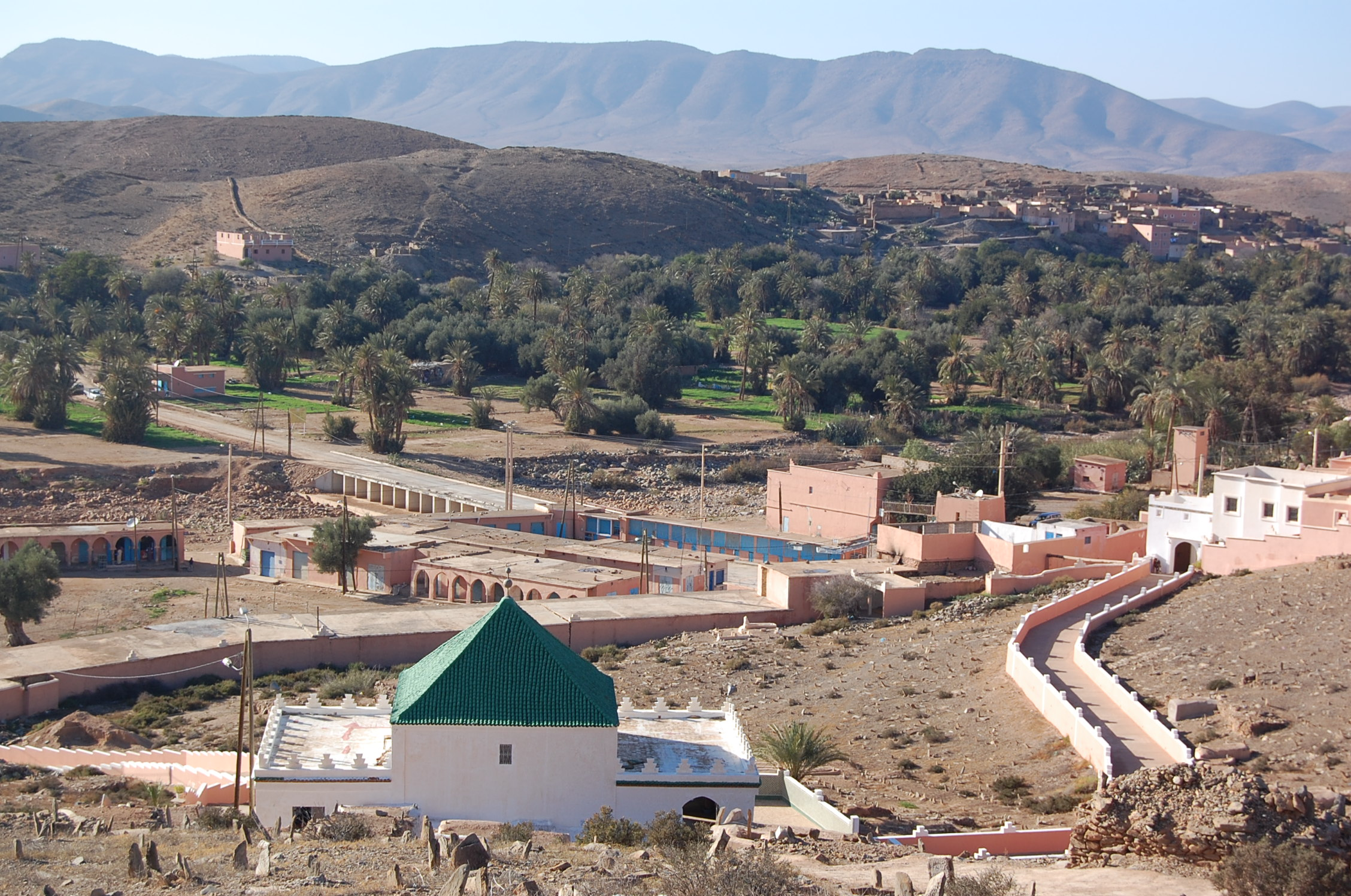
Tomb of Sidi Ahmed Ou Musa in eponymous village in Tazerwalt

Tazerwalt (Arabic: تزروالت, Tachelhit: ⵜⴰⵥⵔⵡⴰⵍⵜ; also spelled Tazeroualt) is a historical region located in the south of Morocco, from which an independent state arose in the 17th century. Governed from its capital of Iligh in the Anti-Atlas mountains, the state of Tazerwalt at its height extended from the Atlantic Ocean to the Touat region in modern-day Algeria, controlling commerce across much of the Sahara.

== Background ==
The spiritual founder of the Tazerwalt dynasty was Sidi Ahmed Ou Moussa, a marabout from the Souss who was born in the mid-15th century and afterwards settled in the Tazerwalt area, where he established a zawiya and attracted hundreds of followers, who came to receive his religious teachings. Sidi Ahmed Ou Moussa maintained close relations with the ruling Saadian dynasty and was able to use his religious standing to carve out an enclave of power within the Saadian state.

Following his death, Sidi Ahmed Ou Moussa's grave became a pilgrimage site, and his offspring inherited much of the wealth and status he had acquired as a spiritual leader.

== The Emirate of Tazerwalt ==
The death of the Saadian Sultan Ahmad al-Mansur in 1603 triggered political instability throughout Morocco, at which point Sidi Ahmed Ou Moussa's grandson Sidi Ali Bou Dmia seized the opportunity to transform the family's religious status into political power. Naming himself the amir of Tazerwalt, he founded a capital at Iligh and consolidated his control over the region by mobilizing his religious following and tribal alliances. Controlling both overland trade routes and major ports such as Agadir, Sidi Ali Bou Dmia extracted the resources needed to raise a sizable army (mainly of slaves), which he then used to further expand borders eastward.

By the mid-17th century, Sidi Ali Bou Dmia controlled a wide swath of the Sahara and Morocco south of the Atlas Mountains, including important centers of trans-Saharan commerce such as the Draa valley, Sijilmasa, Touat, and Taghaza. Sidi Ali Bou Dmia's hegemony, however, was threatened by the rise of the Alaouite dynasty in Tafilalt, who in the late 1650s captured Sijilmasa and eroded much of Tazerwalt's economic power. Sidi Ali Bou Dmia died in 1659 and was briefly succeeded by his son Muhammad, but in 1670 the Alaouites razed the capital of Tazerwalt at Iligh, thus cementing their control over Morocco and bringing a definitive end to Tazerwalt's political independence.

== Later years ==
Following the destruction of Iligh, Ahmed u Musa's descendants lost most of their political power, but were able to leverage their familial connections to the saint to maintain wealth and social prestige as the "House of Iligh." While never directly challenging Alaouite rule, in the 18th and 19th centuries they regained significant political and even military power, enjoying a degree of autonomy that gave them control over much of the Souss region and allowed them to regulate trade and conduct diplomacy with both the ruling Alaouite dynasty and European powers.

Today Sidi Ahmed ou Musa's zawiya remains a site of pilgrimage and is located in the village of Sidi Ahmed Ou Moussa, which shares his name.

== See also ==
- Berbers
