= Ait Ouafqa =

Coordinates: 29.498026°N 9.111875°W

- Rural commune and town
- Interactive map of Ait Ouafqa
- Country: Morocco
- Region: Souss-Massa-Drâa
- Province: Tiznit Province

Population (2004)
  - Total: 5,472
- Time zone: UTC+0 (GMT)

Ait Ouafqa is a small town and rural commune in Tiznit Province of the Souss-Massa-Drâa region of Morocco. At the time of the 2004 census, the commune had a total population of 5472 people living in 1243 households.
