= Mustapha Swinga =

Moroccan YouTuber (born 1986)

Mustapha El Fekkak مصطفى لفكاك
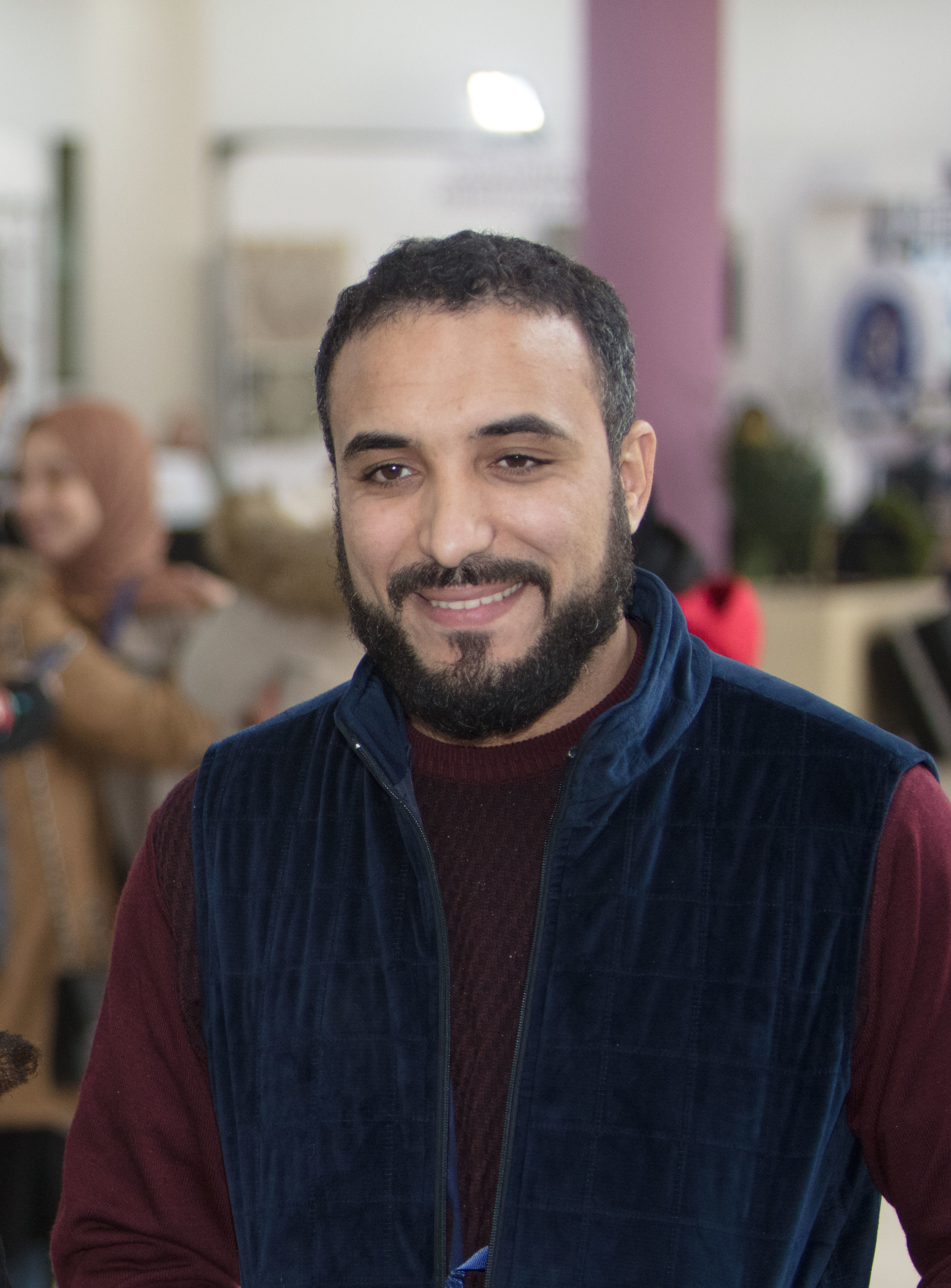
- Born: 1986 (age 39–40); Imintanoute, Morocco
- Occupations: YouTuber; businessman
- Years active: 2011-present
- Known for: Aji Tfham

YouTube information
- Channel: Mustapha Swinga
- Subscribers: 1.07 million
- Views: 59 million
- Last updated: 07 March 2026

Mustapha El Fekkak (Arabic: مصطفى الفكاك; born 1986), better known as Mustapha Swinga (مصطفى سوينكا), is a Moroccan YouTuber and businessman, mostly known for his program "Aji Tfham" which means "come to understand" or "let's figure this out". The show is in Moroccan Darija. In 2014, he won the prize of "Person of the Year" in the 7th edition of Maroc Web Awards, Creativity category.

His distinctive style which was described as "humorous" and "authentic", has led to his emergence as one of the most important figures in the Moroccan digital space, and one of its most trusted voices.

== Early life ==
Mustapha Swinga was born in Imintanoute, Morocco, in 1986. When he was young, his family moved to Casablanca. His mother, Malika, passed away when he was 11 years old, and he was raised by his sisters, with community support, as his father was absent. This early experience shaped him and his approach to creativity.

He received a degree as an IT technician in 2008, and worked in the field for a year and a half with a measly monthly salary (around 2000 MAD, equivalent to about 200 Euro). In 2011, he quit his job to study at the Moroccan National Circus Institute Shemsy in Salé, and graduated after three years as a circus performer and stage director.

== Work ==
=== YouTube and social media ===
Swinga did video montage and assistance for another Moroccan YouTuber in 2011. In 2012, he worked on a series about the story of a magician called Rabie Ben Hormoz. In 2014, he collaborated with the YouTuber Abdellah Abou Jad on "Fine Naqra?" (Moroccan Arabic: فين نقرا؟, meaning "where do I study?"), which led to him winning "Creative Personality of the Year" at the Maroc Web Awards. In the same year, he created the YouTube channel "Stoonet" where he published short videos.

In 2015, he started the channel "Aji-Tfham Achno Fhemt" (Moroccan Arabic: أجي تفهم - أشنو فهمت, meaning "Come to understand what I understood"), which quickly grew into fame and success within Morocco. His first video about ISIS was a great success, reaching hundreds of thousands of views. The content of the channel is entirely in Moroccan Darija with high quality animation, and it reached more than 31 million views and 974,000 subscribers to-date. His personal channel @Mustaphaswingaofficiel reached 728,000 subscribers, and 27.8 million views to-date.

On Aji-Tfham, Mustapha Swinga tackled many important topics, from different areas such as politics, law, economics, and science, simplifying them for the Moroccan public in the commonly spoken Moroccan Darija, with professional animation. Some of these topics include the history of ISIS, Bitcoin and Cryptocurrencies, VAT, COP 22, oil prices, COVID-19, and artificial intelligence, as well as some topics of national concern such as the Moroccan elections, institutions and new legislations. It has been said that public authorities have relied on him to deliver important information to the general public, especially during the Covid-19 pandemic.

In 2020, he blew the whistle on a draft bill by the Moroccan government, that would limit freedom of expression on social media.

On 4 November 2022, he released a video resulted from a collaboration with Moroccan historian Nabil Mouline, about Moroccan-Algerian relations and the History of Morocco. The video was livestreamed to an audience at the historical site of Chellah, Rabat. On YouTube, the video was a great success, reaching 2,1 million views. It was expected to be the first in a series of videos.

The two collaborated later again for a new animated series titled "Basmat al-Tourath" (fingerprint of legacy) dedicated to Morocco's tangible and intangible heritage. The series presented its vision as "making history a living narrative, accessible to everyone, far from closed academic circles and rigid school textbooks", and was broadcast every Friday during the month of Ramadan. The first episode was dedicated to the village of Tinmel, which played a big role in the emergence of the Almohad Caliphate. The following episodes tackled the story of Sayyida Al Hurra, the Seven Saints of Marrakech, and Moroccan mint tea.

Swinga stated that Aji Tfham has no lucrative goals, and that he refused to associate it with one business product or another, making a clear distinction between the channel and his animation business. His distinctive style has been described as "humorous", "authentic", "educational", and "relatable", and led to his emergence as a prominent figure in the Moroccan web. His work on YouTube and social media was described as part of an emerging tendency of fact-checking initiatives and as citizen journalism in Morocco.

=== Business ===
In 2016, Swinga co-founded the company ArtCoustic with Ali Rguigue, which provides animations for customers, such as banks and companies, as well as consultation in matters of communication. He also serves as its CEO.

The company produced animation series for children, which as of 2022 were planned for broadcasting by the Moroccan TV channels Al Oula and 2M.

=== Film ===
Swinga ventured into short films, which include two works: "Janb L7it" in 2020, and "Filter" in 2022, tackling social issues using creative storytelling and animation. The latter, which was produced by ArtCoustic, competed at the International Festival for animation film in Paris (PIAFF). It tells the story of an adolescent girl who lives in contradiction between her modest real life, and her virtual reality.

== Views ==
Swinga has criticized the Moroccan government for not sharing enough information with the public, especially concerning legal matters, stating that "we have to painstakingly dig for the facts and inform the public".

== Criticism ==
Swinga has been criticized for what was described as a "demagogic" and "superficial" tackling of some topics. His comments on draft law 22.20 on social media and the 2018 consumer boycott were criticized as oversimplifying complex economic and political issues. His remarks on press freedom were also criticized, with critics arguing that his claims about restrictions on expression were inconsistent with the wide circulation of his online content and media appearances. He was further criticized for relying on caricature and rhetorical exaggeration rather than substantive analysis and for not addressing broader socio-economic concerns such as living costs, unemployment, and public services.

== Distinctions ==
- 2014: "Person of the Year", at the 7th edition of Maroc Web Awards, Creativity category
- 2025: in the Top 3 most beloved Moroccan influencers, alongside Ilyas El Maliki and Kawtar Bamo, at the Love Brand Ceremony of Les Impériales Week 2025.
