= Mohammed Abaamran =

Moroccan actor (1932–2020)

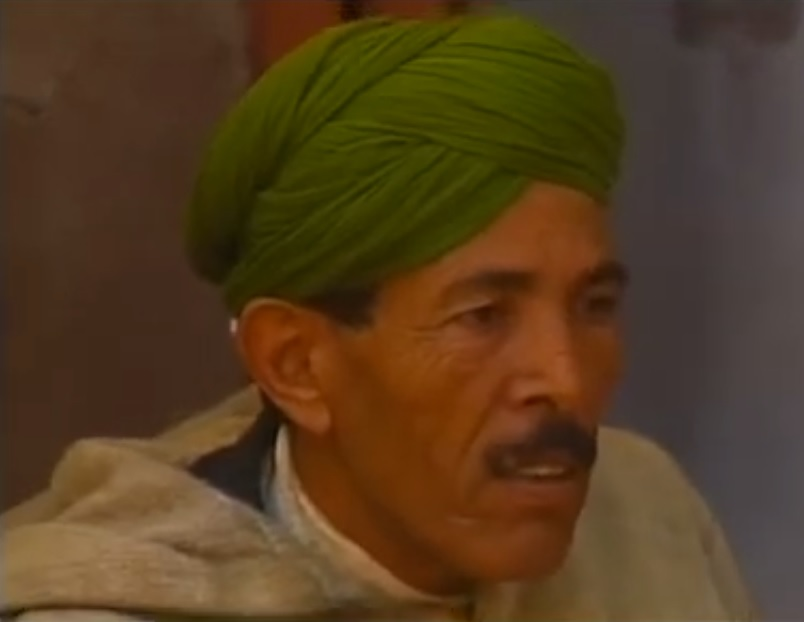
- Born: ⵎⵓⵃⴰⵎⵎⴷ ⴰⴱⴰⵄⵎⵔⴰⵏ; 1932; Ait Erkha, Morocco
- Died: 20 February 2020 (aged 87–88); Casablanca, Morocco
- Occupations: actor, singer

Mohammed Abaamran (in Arabic: محمد أباعمران – in Berber: ⵎⵓⵃⴰⵎⵎⴷ ⴰⴱⴰⵄⵎⵔⴰⵏ) (1932 – 20 February 2020) also known as Butfunast, in reference to the character of Butfunast (cow owner) he played in a film, was a Moroccan actor and singer, performing in Tachelhit.

== Biography ==
He was born in Ait Erkha.

Abaamran started his career in the Jemaa el-Fnaa square in Marrakesh, where he started singing before being noticed and becoming a professional actor. Abaamran became widely famous in Morocco for his role of Butfunast in the film with the same name, which was shot in the 1990s.

Mohammed Abaamran died in Casablanca on 20 February 2020, after a long struggle with an illness.

== See also ==
- Lahoucine Ibourka
