= Tassrirt =

Coordinates: 29.671844°N 8.863305°W

- Rural commune and town
- Interactive map of Tassrirt
- Country: Morocco
- Region: Souss-Massa-Drâa
- Province: Tiznit Province

Population (2004)
  - Total: 1,887
- Time zone: UTC+0 (GMT)

Tassrirt is a small town and rural commune in Tiznit Province of the Souss-Massa-Drâa region of Morocco. At the time of the 2004 census, the commune had a total population of 1,887 people living in 560 households.
