= Ait Issafen =

Coordinates: 29.623079°N 9.29661°W

- Rural commune and town
- Interactive map of Ait Issafen
- Country: Morocco
- Region: Souss-Massa-Drâa
- Province: Tiznit Province

Population (2004)
  - Total: 5,026
- Time zone: UTC+0 (GMT)

Ait Issafen is a small town and rural commune in Tiznit Province of the Souss-Massa-Drâa region of Morocco. At the time of the 2004 census, the commune had a total population of 5026 people living in 1064 households.
