= Ida Ou Gougmar =

Coordinates: 29.544241°N 9.31495°W

- Rural commune and town
- Interactive map of Ida Ou Gougmar
- Country: Morocco
- Region: Souss-Massa-Drâa
- Province: Tiznit Province

Population (2004)
  - Total: 8,170
- Time zone: UTC+0 (GMT)

Ida Ou Gougmar is a small town and rural commune in Tiznit Province of the Souss-Massa-Drâa region of Morocco. At the time of the 2004 census, the commune had a total population of 8,170 people living in 1,567 households.
