= Tarsouat =

Coordinates: 29.6°N 9.033333°W

- Rural commune and town
- Interactive map of Tarsouat
- Country: Morocco
- Region: Souss-Massa-Drâa
- Province: Tiznit Province

Population (2004)
  - Total: 3,096
- Time zone: UTC+0 (GMT)

Tarsouat is a small town and rural commune in Tiznit Province of the Souss-Massa-Drâa region of Morocco. At the time of the 2004 census, the commune had a total population of 3,096 people living in 840 households.
