= Sidi Ahmed Ou Moussa (saint) =

Moroccan Sufi saint and spiritual leader

- Sidi Ḥmad u Musa; سيدي أحمد أو موسى

Personal life
- Born: 1460 Ida Ou Semlal, Sous, Morocco
- Died: 1563 (aged 102–103) or 1564 (aged 103–104) Ida Ou Semlal, Sous, Morocco
- Resting place: Sidi Ahmed Ou Moussa, Morocco

Religious life
- Religion: Islam
- Sect: Sufi

Sidi Ahmed Ou Moussa (Note: Tachelhit: Sidi Ḥmad u Musa; Arabic: سيدي أحمد أو موسى, romanized: Sīdī Aḥmād ū-Mūsā. While French orientalist Henri Laoust transcribed his name as Ḥamed, both French soldier Léopold Justinard and scholar Harry Stroomer transcribe it as Ḥmad. His name in Arabic manuscripts was given as Aḥmad ibn Mūsā al-Jazūlī al-Samlālī.) (1460 – 1563 or 1564) was a Moroccan Sufi saint and spiritual leader of Tazerwalt in the Sous region of Morocco.

== Biography ==
Ahmed Ou Moussa al-Jazouli al-Semlali was born in the mid-15th century around 1460 in Boumarouan, also known as the Ayt Merwan, a small town in the Ida Ou Semlal in the Anti-Atlas mountains of the Sous region. The date of his birth is unknown. His father was Sidi Musa u-Driss and his mother Lalla Tawnut. He descended from the Samalāla tribe and the Jazūla confederation (Igzullen). He is believed to be of Sharifian origin. According to Soussi oral tradition, his ancestors came from Tamdoult n-Waqqa.

Young, he moved to Marrakesh to study Islam before extensively travelling in the east for a long period of time. In 1521, he returned to Ilmatene, a small town in the Sous before settling in Tazerwalt. He founded the Tazerwalt dynasty, and he established an Islamic zawiya, attracting hundreds of followers to his religious mystical teachings.

Sidi Ahmed maintained good relations with the ruling Saadian dynasty and was able to use his religious standing to carve out an enclave of power within the Saadian state. Following his death in 1563, his grave became a pilgrimage site, and his offspring inherited much of the wealth and status he had acquired as a spiritual leader. His descendant Bu-Dmia continued as the emir of Tazerwalt, a short-lived dynasty centered in Iligh before its fall to the Alaouites.

== Legacy ==
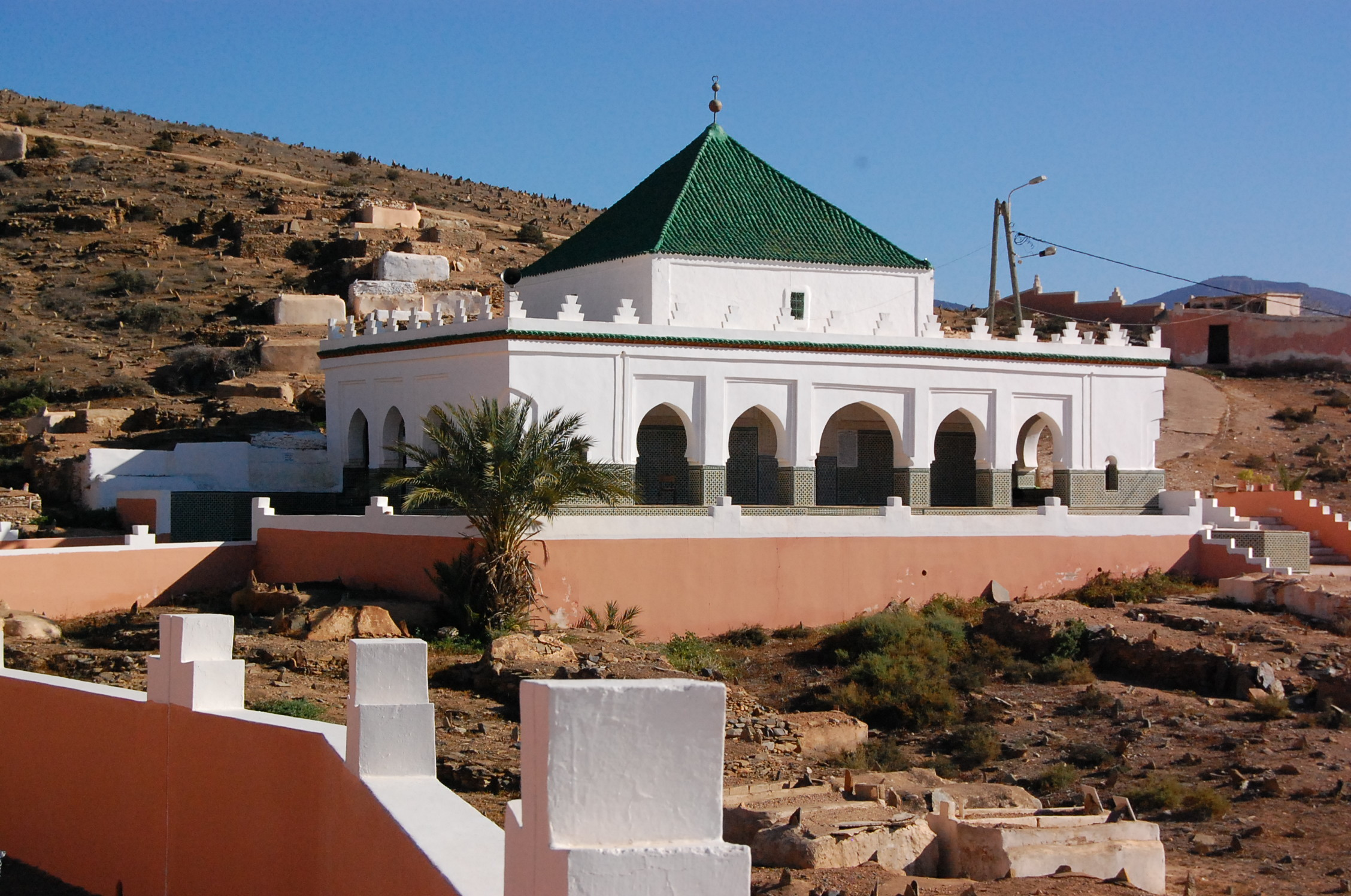
Mausoleum and grave of Sidi Ahmed Ou Moussa.

After his death in 1563, a mausoleum was built in the zawiya and remains as a pilgrimage site in the village of Sidi Ahmed Ou Moussa, which shares his name.

Since the early 20th century, his name has been associated with groups of acrobatic entertainers called Oulad Sidi Ahmed ou Moussa or Ayt Sidi Ḥmad u Musa, and the yearly pilgrimage (or moussem). They are mentioned by George Borrow in The Zincali.

== See also ==
- Tazerwalt
- Muhammad al-Jazuli

== Sources ==
- Stroomer, Harry (2002). "Sidi Hmad U Musa of Tazerwalt (South Morocco) and the tashelhiyt berber oral tradition)". Études et Documents Berbères. 1920 (1): 43–64. doi:10.3917/edb.019.0043. ISSN 0295-5245.
- Hatt, Doyle (2009). "Moroccan Saints' Shrines as Systems of Distributed Knowledge". In Dawson, Allan Charles (ed.). Shrines in Africa: History, Politics, and Society. University of Calgary Press. pp. 153–205. ISBN 978-1-55238-246-2.
