= Ouijjane =

Coordinates: 29.633333°N 9.55°W

- Rural commune and town
- Interactive map of Ouijjane
- Country: Morocco
- Region: Souss-Massa-Drâa
- Province: Tiznit Province

Population (2004)
  - Total: 6,472
- Time zone: UTC+0 (GMT)

Ouijjane is a small town and rural commune in Tiznit Province of the Souss-Massa-Drâa region of Morocco. At the time of the 2004 census, the commune had a total population of 6,472 people living in 1,257 households.
