= Arbaa Rasmouka =

Coordinates: 29.836655°N 9.499065°W

Arbaa Rasmouka tiznit
- Rural commune and town
- Interactive map of Arbaa Rasmouka tiznit
- Country: Morocco
- Region: Souss-Massa-Drâa
- Province: Tiznit Province

Population (2004)
  - Total: 7,503
- Time zone: UTC+0 (GMT)

Arbaa Tiznit Rasmouka is a small town and rural commune in Tiznit Province of the Souss-Massa-Drâa region of Morocco. At the time of the 2004 census, the commune had a total population of 7503 people living in 1360 households.
