= Fatima Tabaamrant =

Moroccan singer-songwriter

Fatima Tabaamrant ⴼⴰⵟⵉⵎⴰ ⵜⴰⴱⴰⵄⵎⵔⴰⵏⵜ
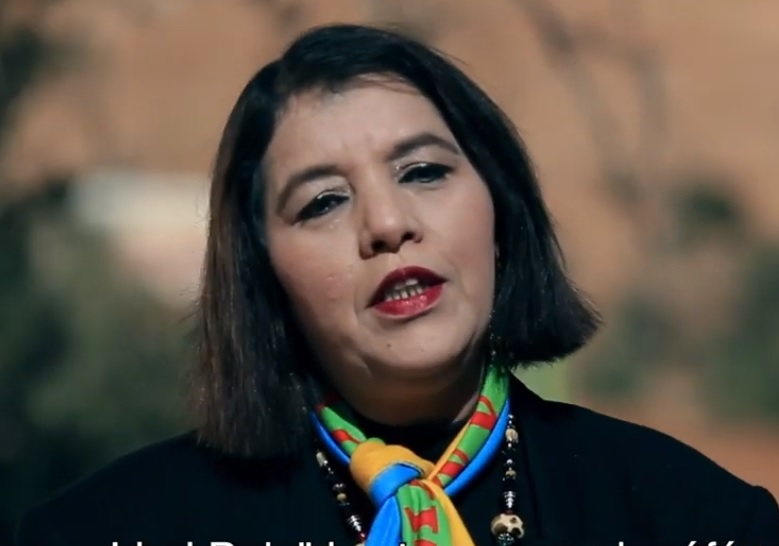
- Fatima Tabaamrant in 2020

Background information
- Born: 1 January 1962 (age 64); Ifrane Atlas-Saghir, Morocco
- Occupation: Singer-songwriter

Fatima Tabaamrant (Tachelhit: ⴼⴰⵟⵉⵎⴰ ⵜⴰⴱⴰⵄⵎⵔⴰⵏⵜ, romanized: Faṭima Tabaɛemrant; born 1962) is a Moroccan Amazigh actress and singer-songwriter. She sings and performs in her native Tashelhit.

== Personal life ==
Fatima Tabaamrant was born in 1962 in Boughafar, into the Idaw Nacer tribe, which is part of the confederation of the Ait Baamrane tribes of the Sous region. She spent her childhood years in Ifrane and Lakhass, Tiznit Province, in the greater external-peripheral, fringe and the outskirts (also parts Jbel Atlas Saghru, Greater lesser Atlas) all are parts high-Atlas and Sous Region, Morocco.

== Career ==
In 1994, Tabaamrant played a singer in an autobiographical film called Tihya.

In 2010, two biographical programs about Tabaamrant were aired on television: Fi Dakira, on Channel 1M TV (RTM), and an episode of Imariren ( 2M MONDE TV Morocco) on June 4, 2010. Imariren, an Amazigh term meaning "singers", is a cultural magazine that profiles the great names in Amazigh music of all genres, tracing the milestones in the evolution of their career since their debut.

== Concerts ==
- 2010:
  - Asnières-sur-Oise, France, L'appel de l'Atlas (Echo of the Atlas), Chant Amazigh de l'Atlas (Songs and Dance of the Atlas), Du slam à l'Atlas (The Sounds in the Atlas), Fatima Tabaamrant, Live Performance, Royaumont Abbey (Department 95); October 3, 8, 9, 10, 2010
  - Television; Massar TV Show (2M MONDE TV Morocco); "Igh Ka Tzriti" musical performance, part of Ahmed Amentag (biography), a 1-hour 45 minutes show; April 16, 2010.
- 2009: Paris, France; Izlan Morocco Cycle, Amazigh songs, poetry and dance. The Atlas Mountains and the Moroccan desert, Théâtre Claude Lévi-Strauss (Musée du Quai Branly), 27 November - 5 December 2009
- 2007: Timitar Festival, Agadir, Morocco, July 6, 2007
- 2006
  - 7th International Festival of Volubilis. "Amazigh Evening" at Volubilis, Morocco. (August 4, 2006)
  - 4th edition Raïss Lhaj Belaïd (Theme) at Place El Mechouar, Tiznit, Tiznit-Provence, Morocco. (July 8, 2006)
- 1999: Paris, France, May 13 and May 15
- 1994: Milan, Italy, outdoor summer concerts ("Berber Nights").

== Discography ==
=== Albums ===
- The Echo of the Atlas (Taghlaghalt), Release Date December 11, 2007

The CD (Taghlaghalt Or The Echo of the Atlas Rayssa Fatima Tabaamrant) available online retail store, Amazon.com, Barnes & Noble,

Album	The Echo of the Atlas (Taghlaghalt) (2007)
Track Listing	Song
1	"Instrumental"
2	"(Ssllam) Salutations"
3	"(Tirra N Yils) Oral Writing"
4	"(Ajddig LLWRD) Hymn to Nature"
5	"(A Bu Nniyt) O Gullible"
6	"(Ait L Aql)Common Sense"
7	"Farewell Instrumental"

Album	"Atalb Itarane" (2010), Golf Music (Casablanca)
Track Listing	Song
1	"Taïry Nun Ayamarg"
2	"Ataddwat Amin"
3	"Ikoun Ayadrdour Fagh Harekan Akaln"
4	"Lhem Ow Lhem"

Album	"Ward Ihadan Aman" (July 2009), Afraou Cassette Production (Agadir), (Afraw)
Track Listing	Song
1	"Origui Rwa Azlmad"
2	"Izam Akrkad"
3	"Yayran Jenb Limam"
4	"Asaksi Dljawab"
5	"Frahnit Tazaamt"
6	"Ward Ihadan Aman"

Album	"Azul N Henna" (November 2008), Afraou Cassette Production (Agadir), (Afraw)
Track Listing	Song
1	"Amound Digh Ayamarg"
2	"Nan Itrane"
3	"Mani Tlkam Twada"
4	"Azul El Henna"

Album	"Baba Yuba" (July 2007), Afraou Cassette Production (Agadir), (Afraw)
Track Listing	Song
1	"Ourid Anmoun Atawnza"
2	"Baba Yuba (Baba Youba)"
3	"Agagh Our Tmalat"
4	"Ayan Ihdane"

Album	"Izd Akal N Tmazight" (January 2007), Afraou Cassette Production (Agadir), (Afraw)
Track Listing	Song
1	"Izd Akal N'Tmazight"
2	"Afrak"
3	"Aghzifad Aygane"
4	"Bdigh Awal Nek Slkhir"

Album	"Touf Darngh Imi Lward" (2006), Afraou Cassette Production (Agadir), (Afraw)
Track Listing	Song
1	"Oraka awdi Nigh Yat"
2	"Touf darngh imi Lward"
3	"Ara amarg Artirirt"
4	"Figh adar Itbrida"

== See also ==
- Tashelhit
- Naima Moujahid
- Ahmed Amentag
