= Tiznit Province =

Province in Souss-Massa, Morocco

Coordinates: 29°42′N 9°44′W

Tiznit Province إقليم تيزنيت ⵜⴰⵙⴳⴰ ⵏ ⵜⵣⵏⵉⵜ
- Province
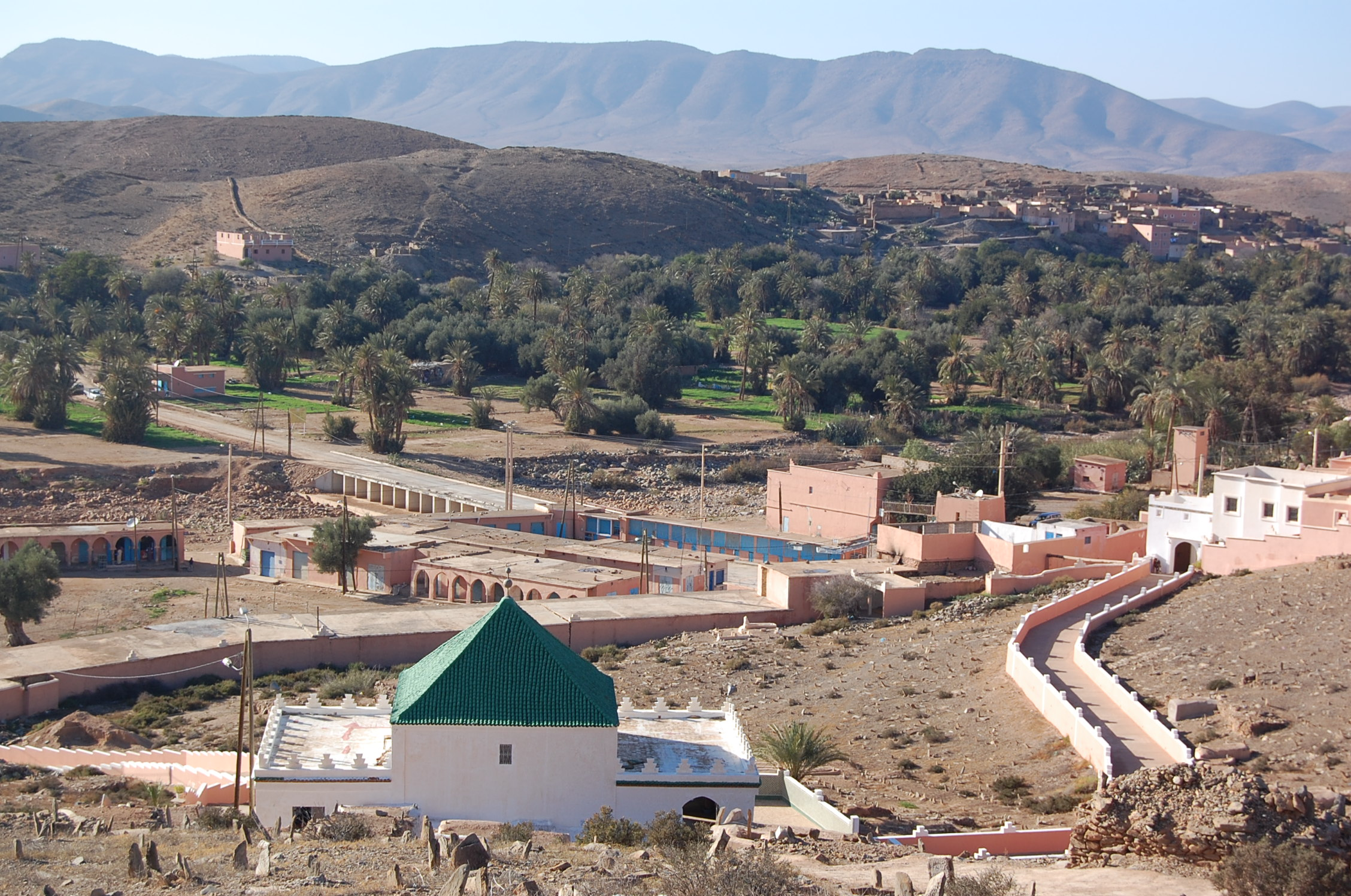
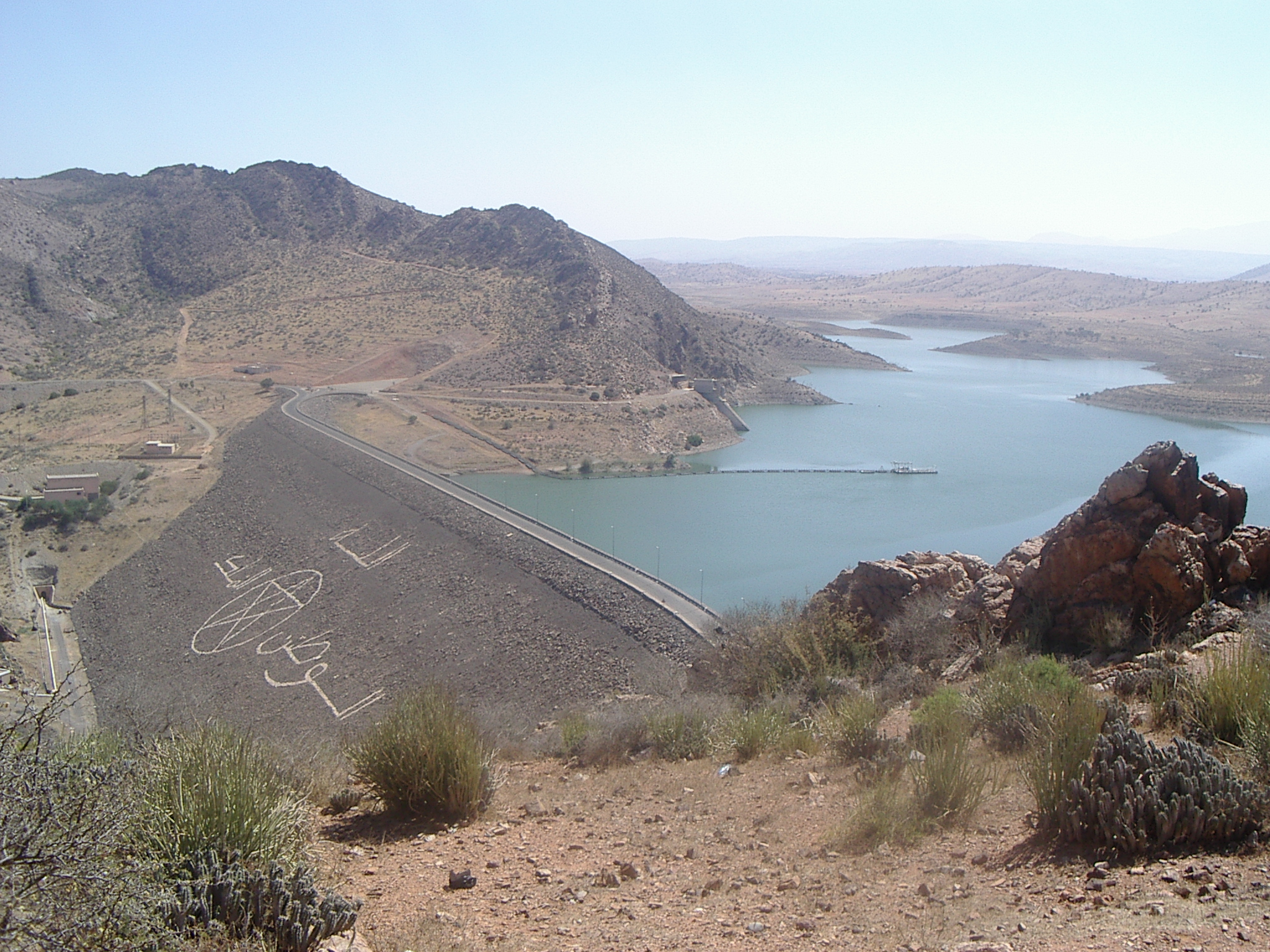
- Zawiya of Sidi Ahmed Ou Moussa (Tazerwalt) Yusuf ibn Tashfin dam Aglou beach
- Interactive map of Tiznit Province
- Country: Morocco
- Region: Souss-Massa
- Capital: Tiznit

Population (2024)
  - Total: 198,367

Tiznit (Arabic: تيزنيت; Standard Moroccan Tamazight: ⵜⵉⵣⵏⵉⵜ) is a province in the Moroccan economic region of Souss-Massa. Its population in 2024 is 198,367.

The major cities and towns are:

- Tafraout
- Tiznit
- Aglou

== Subdivisions ==
Communes of Tiznit Province

The province is divided administratively into the following municipalities and communes:

=== Rural communes ===
Name	Geographic code	Households (2024)	Population (2024)
Afella Ighir	581.09.01.	855	2446
Ait Issafen	581.03.01.	813	2497
Ait Ouafqa	581.09.03.	1135	3376
Ammelne	581.09.05.	1088	2782
Anzi	581.03.03.	1793	6199
Arbaa Ait Ahmed	581.03.05.	1210	3918
Arbaa Rasmouka	581.11.01.	1378	4620
Arbaa Sahel	581.11.03.	2650	8820
Bounaamane	581.11.05.	2485	8932
El Maader El Kabir	581.11.07.	1797	6009
Ida Ou Gougmar	581.03.07.	1327	4250
Irigh N'Tahala	581.09.07.	518	1417
Ouijjane	581.11.09.	1180	4079
Reggada	581.11.11.	3458	12521
Sidi Ahmed Ou Moussa	581.03.09.	910	3339
Sidi Bouabdelli	581.11.13.	1290	4610
Tafraout El Mouloud	581.03.11.	710	2014
Tarsouat	581.09.09.	741	2001
Tassrirt	581.09.11.	464	1130
Tighmi	581.03.13.	1551	5492
Tizoughrane	581.03.15.	1231	3725
Tnine Aday	581.03.17.	539	1696
Tnine Aglou	581.11.15.	2979	9950

=== Municipalities ===
Name	Geographic code	Households (2024)	Population (2024)
Tafraout	581.01.05.	1849	6124
Tiznit	581.01.07.	23860	86595
