= Imintanoute =

Coordinates: 31°09′36″N 8°51′00″W

Imintanoute ⵉⵎⵉ ⵏ ⵜⴰⵏⵓⵜ إمنتانوت
- Town
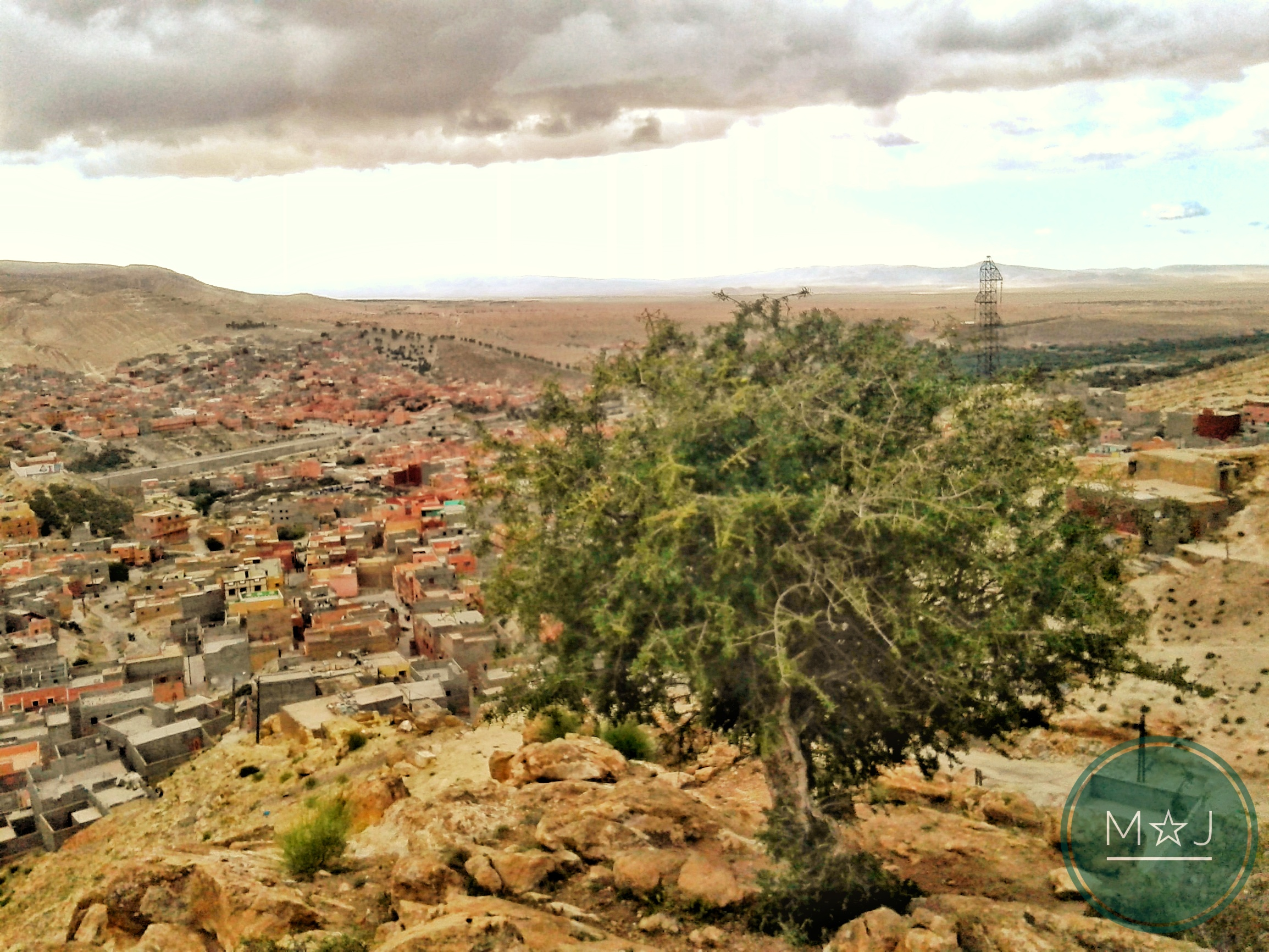
- Interactive map of Imintanoute
- Country: Morocco
- Region: Marrakesh-Safi
- Province: Chichaoua

Population (2024)
  - Total: 25,049
- Time zone: UTC+0 (GMT)

Imintanoute (Arabic: إمنتانوت, ʔimintānūt; in Tifinagh: ⵉⵎⵉ ⵏ ⵜⴰⵏⵓⵜ) is a town in the Chichaoua Province, Marrakesh-Safi, Morocco. According to the 2024 census it had a population of 25,049.

== Notable people ==
- Lartiste - rapper and singer (born 1985)
- Mustapha Swinga - YouTuber and businessmen (born 1986)
- Houssine El Baz - singer

== See also ==
- Chichaoua
- Sid L Mukhtar
- Sidi Zouine
