= Sidi Ahmed Ou Moussa (village) =

Coordinates: 29.507945°N 9.449195°W

- Rural commune and town
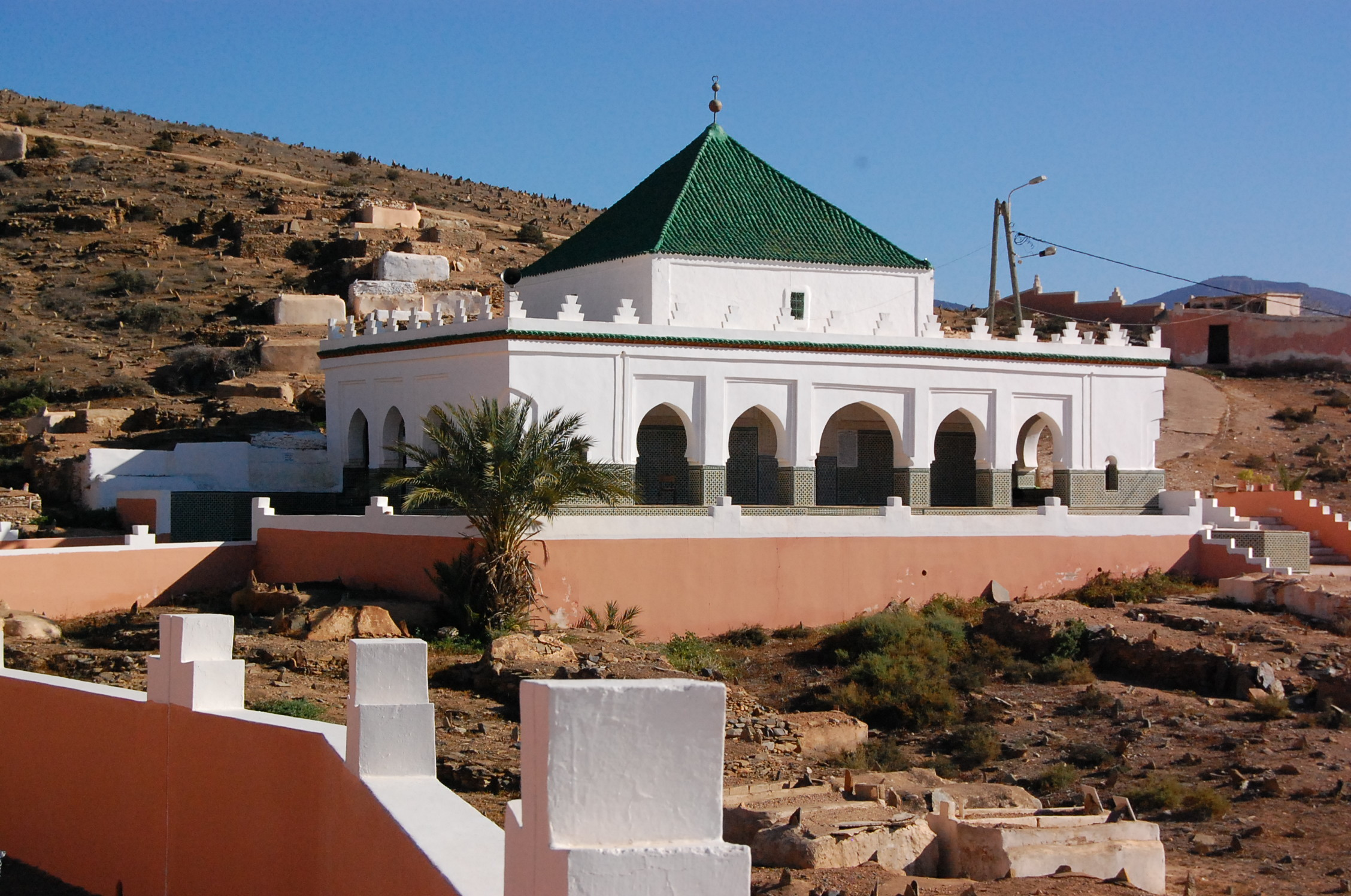
- Interactive map of Sidi Ahmed Ou Moussa
- Country: Morocco
- Region: Souss-Massa-Drâa
- Province: Tiznit Province

Population (2004)
  - Total: 4,256
- Time zone: UTC+0 (GMT)

Sidi Ahmed Ou Moussa is a small town and rural commune in Tiznit Province of the Souss-Massa-Drâa region of Morocco. At the time of the 2004 census, the commune had a total population of 4,256 people living in 809 households.

== See also ==
- Sidi Ahmed Ou Moussa (Saint)
