= Mohamed Demsiri =

Mohamed Demsiri محمد الدمسيري
- Also known as: Mohamed Albensir
- Born: Muhammed Ajahud; 1936; Tamsoult, Morocco
- Died: November 11, 1989 (aged 52–53)
- Genres: Amarg Tachelhit
- Occupations: Singer, musician
- Instruments: Voice, Rebab

Mohamed Ajahud (full name: al-hajj Muhamad ibn Lahsen ad-Damsiri; 1936 – 11 November 1989), widely known as Mohamed Demsiri (in amazigh: Muḥmmad Albensir), was a Moroccan singer-poet (ṛṛays) and rebab player. He sang in Shilha. He is considered to be the most representative modern classical singer of amarg ajdid "the new generation of singers".

== Biography ==
He was born in 1936 in Tamsoult in the Demsira region, but he lived most of his life in Casablanca. His father was a butcher. His last name was Ajaḥud. Thus, his artistic name Demsiri which means "from Demsira". However, his real name is Muḥammad Ajaḥud. He studied in a quranic school in order to teach the Qur'an in turn, but he didn't do it. He started to become famous in 1963.

He had been the pupil of several masters, the least well known but nevertheless the most appreciated was the al-hajj Muḥammad Umarak. Demsiri's fame was perhaps only surpassed by that of Lhaj Belaid.

In 1965, he successively traveled to Germany, Switzerland, France, Belgium and the Netherlands with the Cirque Amar, all of which have large Moroccan communities. After his trip to Europe, he went to Algeria. After 1978, he formed his orchestra of 9 musicians, among them was his adopted son, Hassan Aglaou.

Because of his political songs, he was arrested in 1981 after he wrote the song "Aɡg°rn" (meaning flour in Shilha berber) which is criticizing the socio-economic conditions in Morocco at that time.

== Legacy ==
Mohamed Demsiri wrote more than 566 songs and poems treating several social, cultural and political topics. Some of his famous poems and songs are:

- Aggurn (The Flour)
- Rwaḥ darneɣ (Come With Us)
- Ad daɣ nalla f rbbi
- Koullo Dwa Youjad Issaht
- Ah Ayatbire
- Ah Ayan Youi Wassif
- Aya Hbib Izougn

== See also ==
- Omar Wahrouch
- Said Achtouk
- Lhaj Belaid
