= Omar Wahrouch =

Omar Wahrouch عمر واهروش
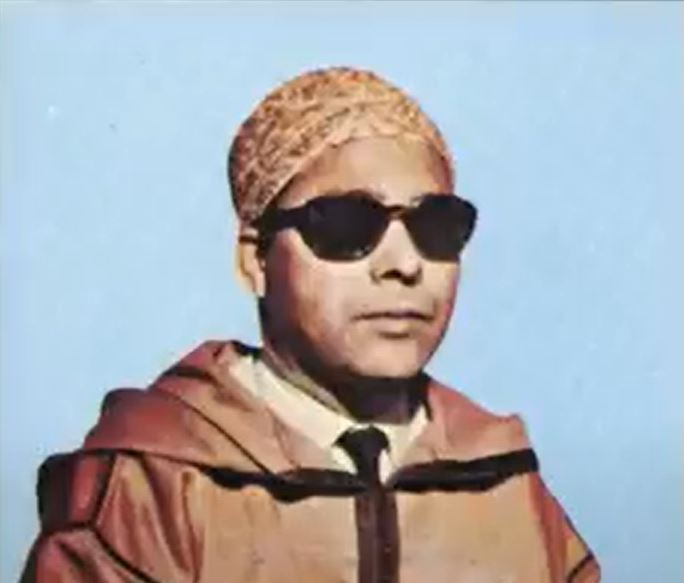

Background information
- Born: 1926; Imintanoute, Morocco
- Died: 27 October 1994 (aged 67–68) Marrakesh, Morocco
- Occupations: poet, singer and songwriter

Omar Wahrouch (1926 – 1994) was a Moroccan singer-poet (ṛṛays) and songwriter. He wrote and sang in Tashelhit.

== Biography ==
Omar Wahrouch was born in a small town near Imintanoute in the region of Marrakesh, Morocco. The date of his birth is contested between 1926 and 1933 due to the uncommon recording of births in that period. He was influenced by his father who was also a musician (rayss) and taught him the skills of playing Rebab and poetry.

His musical career began in 1952 when he performed in public with the song "The Officer" about French colonialism, which led to his imprisonment for three months.

After Moroccan independence, he continued performing in national and international festivals and concerts. He performed in France in 1963 and Belgium in 1964 before going on pilgrimage in 1968. He became famous in the 1970s for his songs about nationalism, colonialism, poverty, oppression, and social problems.

Omar's last known recording was in 1987 before the onset of the mental illness that led to his admission to a psychiatric hospital in 1991. He stayed there for one year and came back home in his village where he died on 27 October 1994.

== Legacy ==
Omar Wahrouch wrote several poems and songs about social, cultural, and political topics. Some of his famous poems and songs are:

- Titbirine (Doves)
- The Officer
- Imehssaden (The Jealous)
- Ifarkhane N Ait Omarg (Children of musicians)

== See also ==
- Mohamed Demsiri
- Said Achtouk
