= Oulad =

Oulad may refer to:

People

- Chahid Oulad El Hadj (born 1988), a professional Moroccan-Dutch Welterweight Muay Thai kickboxer and martial artist

Places

- Dar Oulad Zidouh, a town in Béni-Mellal Province, Tadla-Azilal, Morocco
- Oulad Abbou, a town in Settat Province, Chaouia-Ouardigha, Morocco
- Oulad Ayad, a town in Béni-Mellal Province, Tadla-Azilal, Morocco
- Oulad Embarek, a small town, southwest of Beni Mellal in Beni Mellal Province, in the Tadla-Azilal region of Morocco
- Oulad H Riz Sahel, a town in Settat Province, Chaouia-Ouardigha, Morocco
- Oulad M'Rah, a town in Settat Province, Chaouia-Ouardigha, Morocco
- Oulad M Barek, a town in Béni-Mellal Province, Tadla-Azilal, Morocco
- Oulad Said, a town in Settat Province, Chaouia-Ouardigha, Morocco
- Oulad Teima, a town in Taroudant Province, Souss-Massa-Draâ, Morocco
- Oulad Yahya Louta, a town in Ben Slimane Province, Chaouia-Ouardigha, Morocco
- Oulad Yaich, a town in Béni-Mellal Province, Tadla-Azilal, Morocco
- Oulad Zbair, a town in Taza Province, Taza-Al Hoceima-Taounate, Morocco
- Outat Oulad el Hadj, a Moroccan town situated on the banks of the Moulouya River

Tribes

- Oulad Bou Sbaa, a Chorfa/Zaouia tribe of Idrissid origins, who claim descent from Abu Sib'a, the Idrissid 16th century tribal chief
- Oulad Delim, a Sahrawi tribe of mainly Arab origins, formerly considered of Hassane status, i.e. part of the ruling warrior stratum
- Oulad Tidrarin, a Sahrawi-marocaine tribe of mainly Arab origins, formerly considered to be of Ansar status
