= Tartemat =

- Town
- Location within Morocco
- Coordinates: 32°28′N 6°17′W
- Country: Morocco
- Region: Béni Mellal-Khénifra
- Province: Béni Mellal
- Time zone: UTC+0 (GMT)

Tartemat is a small agricultural town north of Béni Mellal in Béni Mellal Province, in the Béni Mellal-Khénifra region of Morocco.
