= Tadla =

Historical and geographical region of Morocco

Tadla Arabic: تادلة Standard Moroccan Tamazight: ⵜⴰⴷⵍⴰ
- Traditional Region
- Kasba Tadla c. 1913

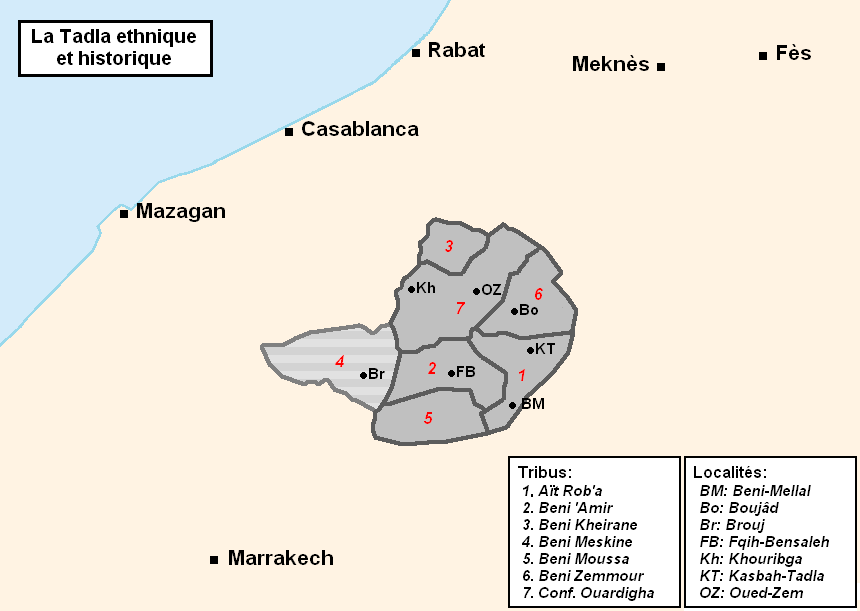
- A map of the historical Tadla region and its tribes.
- Country: Morocco
- Region: Béni Mellal-Khénifra

Tadla (Note: Arabic: تادلة, romanized: Tādla Standard Moroccan Tamazight: ⵜⴰⴷⵍⴰ, romanized: tadla) is a historical and geographical region of Morocco, located in the center of the country, north of the High Atlas mountain range and west of the Middle Atlas. It is the region of origin of the eponymous collection of tribal, semi-nomadic pastoralist population, the Tadla tribes.

Currently, the region of Tadla is mainly part of the administrative region of Béni Mellal-Khénifra, except for the historical territory of the Beni Meskine tribe, which is part of the Casablanca-Settat administrative region.

== Etymology ==
The name comes from Tamazight, meaning sheaf in reference to cereal production in the region.

== History ==
The region of Tadla is mentioned in medieval Arabic geographical and historical writings, with two prominent cities in the territory : Madinat-Tadla and Daï. The 11th-century geographer al-Bakri recorded that following the death of Idris II, his son Yahya received Daï and its surrounding territories, although other accounts attribute Tadla to his son Ahmad. During the medieval period, Daï was an important settlement associated with mineral extraction, situated near present-day Beni Mellal.

In the early 16th century, Leo Africanus described Tefza as the principal town of Tadla, mentioning the nearby settlement of Efza and the presence of Jewish merchant and artisan communities. The later Spanish chronicler Luis del Mármol Carvajal identified Efza with Fishtala, a Sanhaja tribe. During the expansion of the Saadi dynasty northwards, Tadla became a contested region between the Saadians and the Wattasid dynasty, with Fishtala eventually submitting to the Saadians in 1545.

== Geography ==
Tadla is a plain in central Morocco, situated between the High Atlas Mountains to the south and the phosphate plateau to the north, at an average elevation of approximately 400 metres (1,300 ft). Covering around 3,600 km², the south of the plain is traversed by the Oum Er-Rbia River, which is used for irrigation. The region has an arid to semi-arid continental climate, characterised by hot summers and relatively low rainfall.

== Demography ==
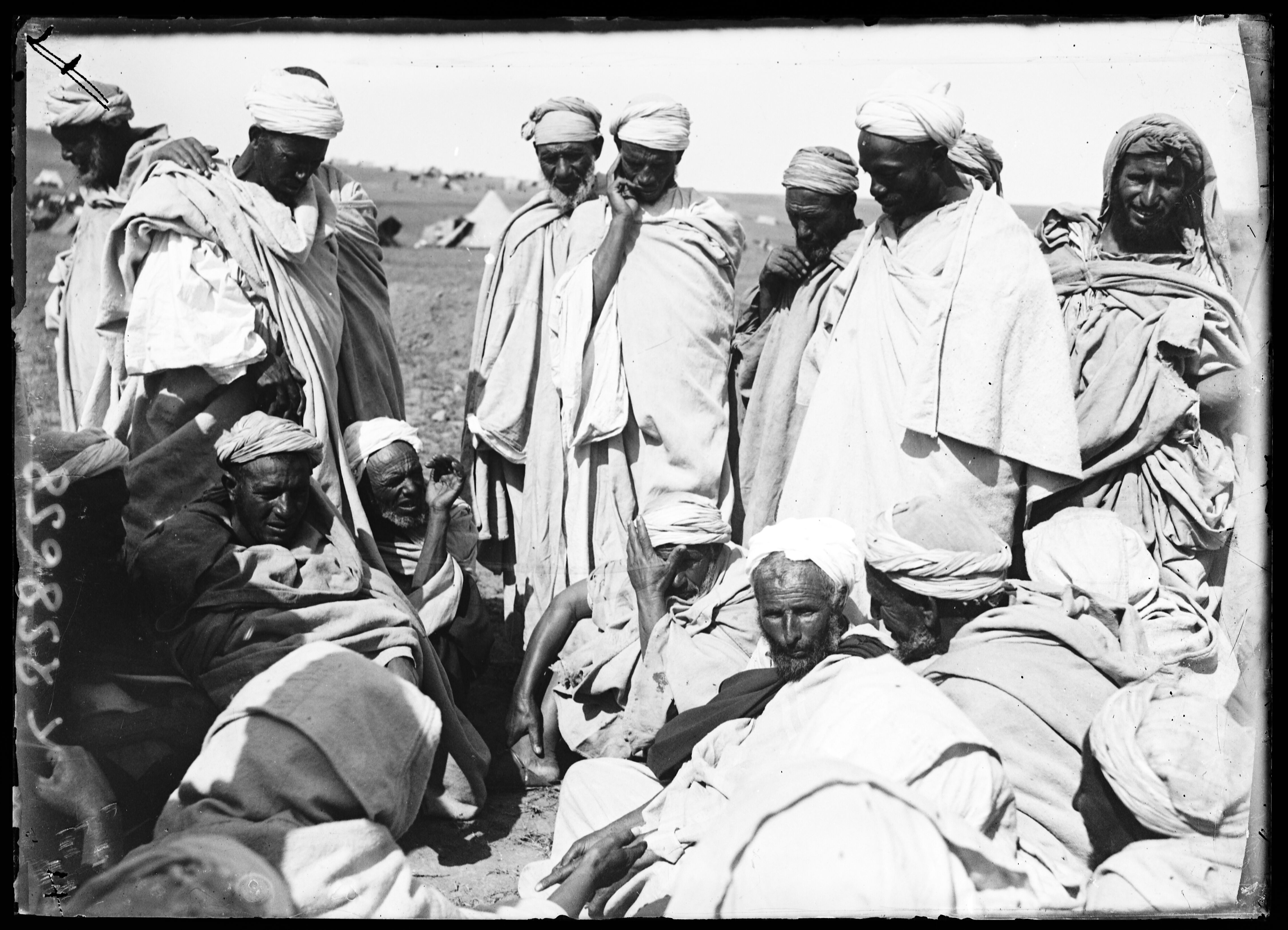
Men of the Beni Amir tribe forced to submit after the fighting at Kasba Tadla, 1913

The population of the Tadla is traditionally divided into 9 tribes, mainly of Arab origin:

- Aït Robʿa tribe: occupying the western part of the modern Beni Mellal Province, formed under Moulay Ismael (r. 1672–1727) by the merging of an original Tadla tribe (Beni Mellal) with three Guich tribes (Guettaya, Samguet and Beni Maʿdane)
- Beni ʿAmir tribe: occupying the northern part of the modern Fquih Ben Salah Province
- Beni Khirane tribe: occupying the northwestern part of the modern Khouribga Province
- Beni Meskine tribe: occupying the southern part of the modern Settat Province, formerly part of the Tadla confederacy, joined the Chaouia confederacy in the 19th century
- Beni Moussa tribe: occupying the southern part of the modern Fquih Ben Salah Province
- Beni Zemmour tribe: occupying the eastern part of the modern Khouribga Province
- Ouardigha tribal confederacy: occupying the central and the western parts of the modern Khouribga Province; confederacy formed by 3 tribes: Oulad Bahr Kbar, Oulad Bahr Sghar and Smaʿla.

== Bibliography ==
- (in French) Cpt. R. Peyronnet, "History of the Tadla from the origins to 1910" (French: Histoire du Tadla des origines à 1910), in: Bulletin de la Société de Géographie d'Alger et de l'Afrique du Nord, 24th y. (1919), pp. 49–62
- (in Arabic) A. M. Qasimi, "History of the Bani ʿAmir tribe and the neighbouring Tadla, 1188-1956" (Arabic: تارخ قبيلة بني عمير والمحيط التادلي، 1188م - 1956م), D.N. (2005)
