= Fquih Ben Salah =

Fquih Ben Salah الفقيه بن صالح
- City
- Interactive map of Fquih Ben Salah
- Coordinates: 32°30′16″N 6°41′11″W
- Country: Morocco
- Region: Béni Mellal-Khénifra
- Province: Fquih Ben Salah Province
- Elevation: 437 m (1,434 ft)

Population (2014)
  - Total: 97,380
- Time zone: UTC+0 (GMT)

Fquih Ben Salah (Arabic: الفقيه بن صالح) is a city in central Morocco, located in the region of Béni Mellal-Khénifra, it is the capital of Fquih Ben Salah Province.

According to the 2024 Moroccan census, it has a population of 97,380.

== History ==
The city is located in the territory of the Arab tribe of Beni Amir, which is part of the Tadla tribal confederation.

== Twin towns ==
- Don Benito, Spain

== See also ==
- IR Fkih Ben Salah
