= Les yeux secs =

- Al Ouyoune El Jaffa
- Directed by: Narjiss Nejjar
- Written by: Narjiss Nejjar
- Cinematography: Denis Gravouil
- Edited by: Emmanuelle Pencalet
- Music by: Guy-Roger Duvert
- Production companies: Jbila Méditerranée Prod, Soread-2M (Morocco), Terre Sud Films (France)
- Distributed by: Films sans Frontières
- Release date: 2003
- Running time: 116 minutes
- Countries: Morocco, France
- Languages: Moroccan Arabic, Berber
- Budget: €600,000

Les Yeux secs (US title: Cry No More) is a French-Moroccan film directed by Narjiss Nejjar and released in 2003. The critically acclaimed film was selected for the Directors' Fortnight in Cannes, the FIFF, and the Marrakech Film Festival. It won numerous awards, including the Bayard d'Or for Best Screenplay in Namur.

Les yeux secs was Nejjar's first feature film. It deals with several subjects, particularly the emancipation of women and the control of men over their destiny. She initially planned on making a documentary about the village in question, but ultimately chose to make a fictional film as she sensed a reluctance on the part of the village's inhabitants.

The film, set in the Berber towns of Aghbala and Tizi N'Isly and shot in Tamazight, was a commercial success in France, but faced domestic controversy. The women of Aghbala and Tizi filed a lawsuit against Nejjar for defamation.

== Synopsis ==
An old woman gets out of prison after 25 years. Outside, she meets Fahd, a young bus driver who offers to take her back to her village. The old woman accepts but warns him that she will pass him off as her son, because it is a village of women who offer their bodies, where only men who pay can enter. The prostitutes are encouraged to abandon their children at birth so that the new generation is not trapped in this tragic fate. These women, who dream of being loved, must therefore keep their eyes dry and hide their pain. The old woman finds her daughter, Hala, the meanspirited, authoritarian leader of the village, whom she abandoned 25 years earlier. She decides to free this community from its curse.

== Cast ==
- Siham Assif (as Hala)
- Khalid Benchagra (as Fahd, the driver)
- Fatima "Raouia" Harrandi (as Mina, the old woman)
- Rafika Belhaj (as Zinba)

== Awards and accolades ==
Moroccan National Film Festival 2003:

- Prize for the Best Directorial Debut (for Narjiss Nejjar)
- Prize for the Best Female Role (for Fatima "Raouia" Harrandi)
- Prize for Best Costumes (for Hayat Sbai)

2003 Namur International Francophone Film Festival

- Bayard d'or for Best Screenplay
