= Oulad Gnaou =

Oulad Gnaou أولاد كناو
- Rural commune and town
- Location within Morocco
- Coordinates: 32°19′40″N 6°30′2″W
- Country: Morocco
- Region: Béni Mellal-Khénifra
- Province: Béni Mellal

Population (2004)
  - Total: 11,256
- Time zone: UTC+0 (GMT)

Oulad Gnaou is a small town and rural commune in Béni Mellal Province, Béni Mellal-Khénifra, Morocco. At the time of the 2004 census, the commune had a total population of 11256 people living in 1961 households. The town is located 15.6 kilometres (9.7 mi) west by road from Beni Mellal. Agriculture forms the backbone of the local economy; in 1950-51 experiments were conducted into irrigating wheat crops in the commune. The growth of irrigation in the area was facilitated by the famine of 1945. The land in the commune is semi-arid.
