= Oulad Embarek =

- Town
- Location within Morocco
- Coordinates: 32°17′N 6°28′W
- Country: Morocco
- Region: Béni Mellal-Khénifra
- Province: Beni Mellal Province

Population (2004)
  - Total: 11,906
- Time zone: UTC+0 (GMT)

Oulad Embarek is a town in Béni-Mellal Province, Béni Mellal-Khénifra, Morocco. According to the 2004 census it has a population of 11,906.

It is located 138 kilometres (86 mi) from Casablanca. The N8 highway connects the town with Beni Mellal in the northeast.
