= Sidi Aissa Ben Ali =

- Rural commune and town
- Location within Morocco
- Coordinates: 32.3442°N 6.6556°W
- Country: Morocco
- Region: Béni Mellal-Khénifra
- Province: Fquih Ben Salah

Population (2004)
  - Total: 22,697
- Time zone: UTC+0 (GMT)

Sidi Aissa Ben Ali is a town and rural commune in Fquih Ben Salah Province, Béni Mellal-Khénifra, Morocco. At the time of the 2004 census, the commune had a total population of 22,697 people living in 3735 households.
