= Kasbah of Beni Mellal =

Moroccan cultural heritage site

- قصبة بني ملال
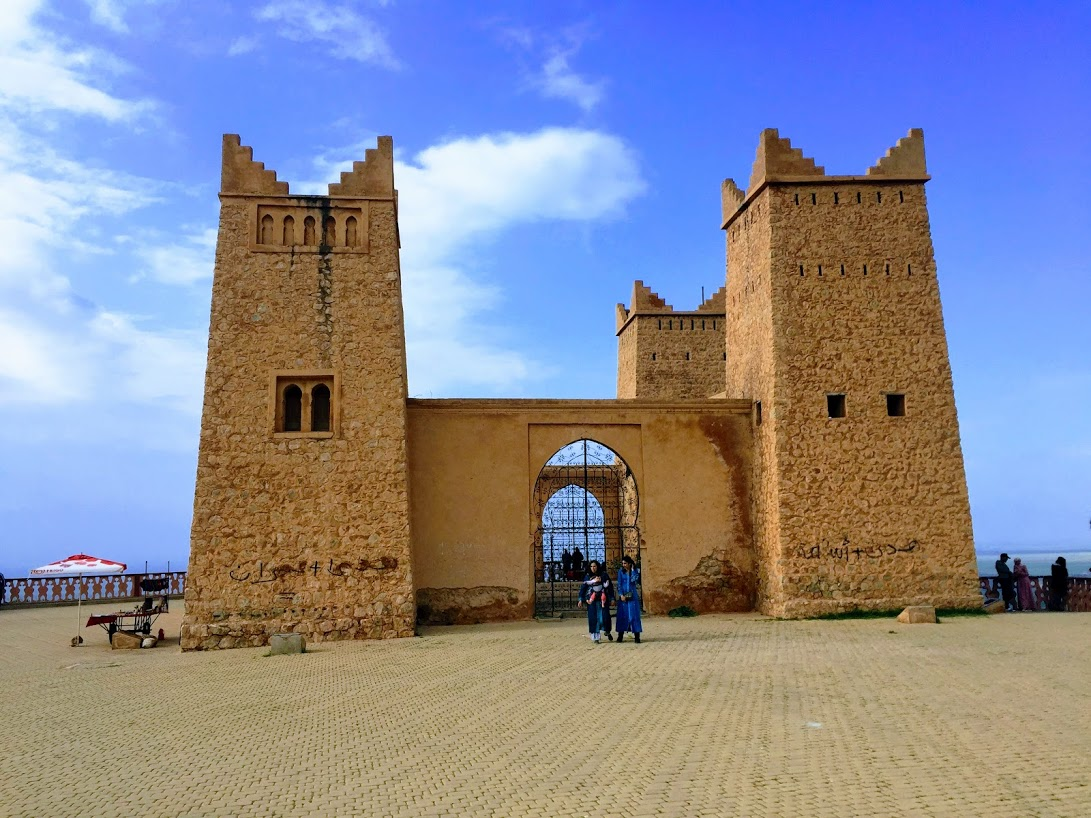
- Interactive map of Kasbah of Beni Mellal
- Location: Beni Mellal
- Coordinates: 32°19′29″N 6°20′15″W
- Completion date: 1688

Kasbah of Beni Mellal is a kasbah in Beni Mellal, Morocco. It is a classified monument by the Moroccan Ministry of Culture.

== Name ==
The Kasbah is also named Kasbah or Borj Ras el Ain instead of Beni Mellal.

== History ==
The Kasbah is located on the top of a mountain next to Ain Asserdoune, which provides a view over the city of Beni Mellal.

It was first built by the Alaouite Sultan Moulay Ismail to protect the city from invaders.

== Gallery ==
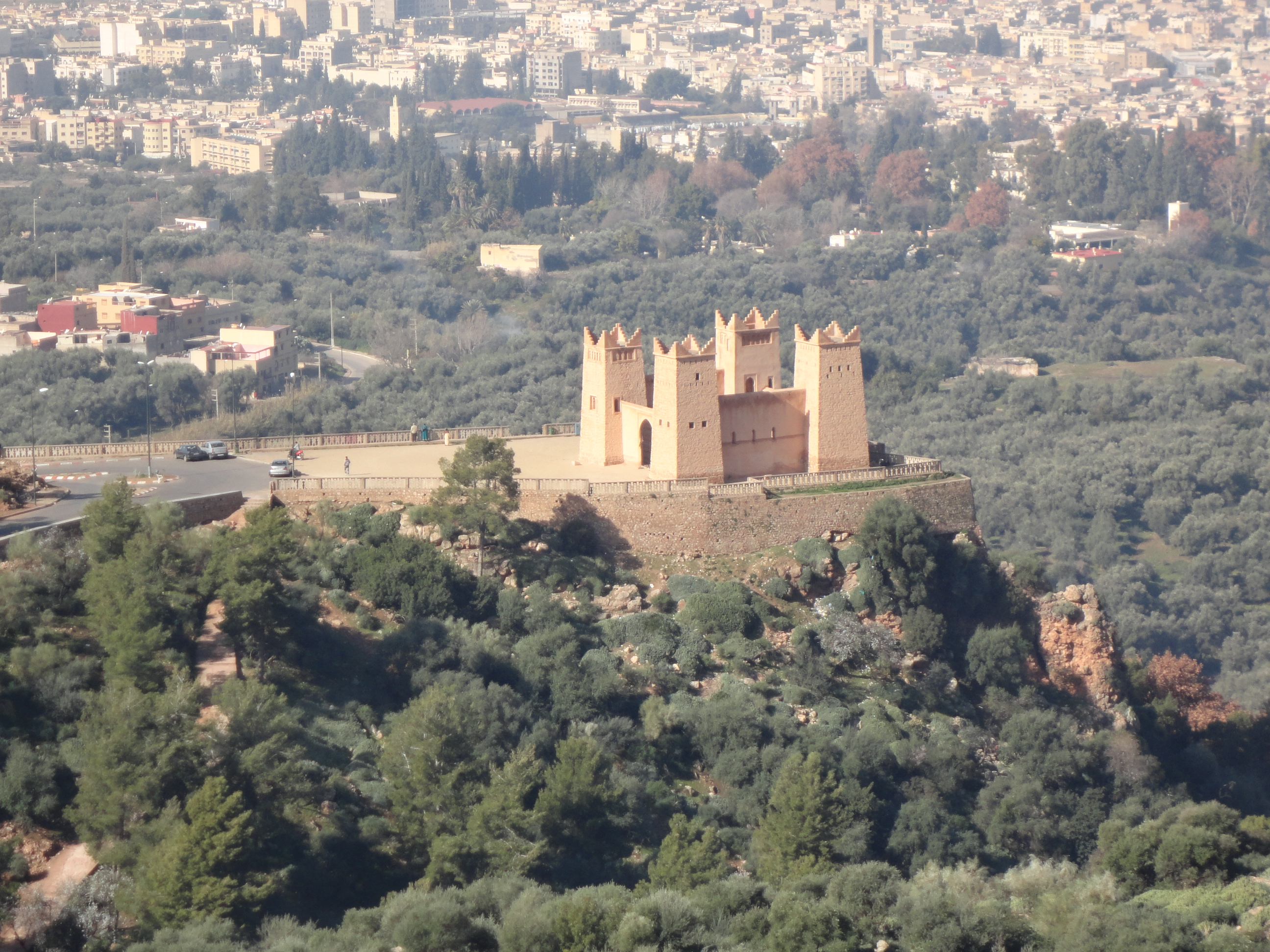
The Kasbah with a view over the city of Beni Mellal

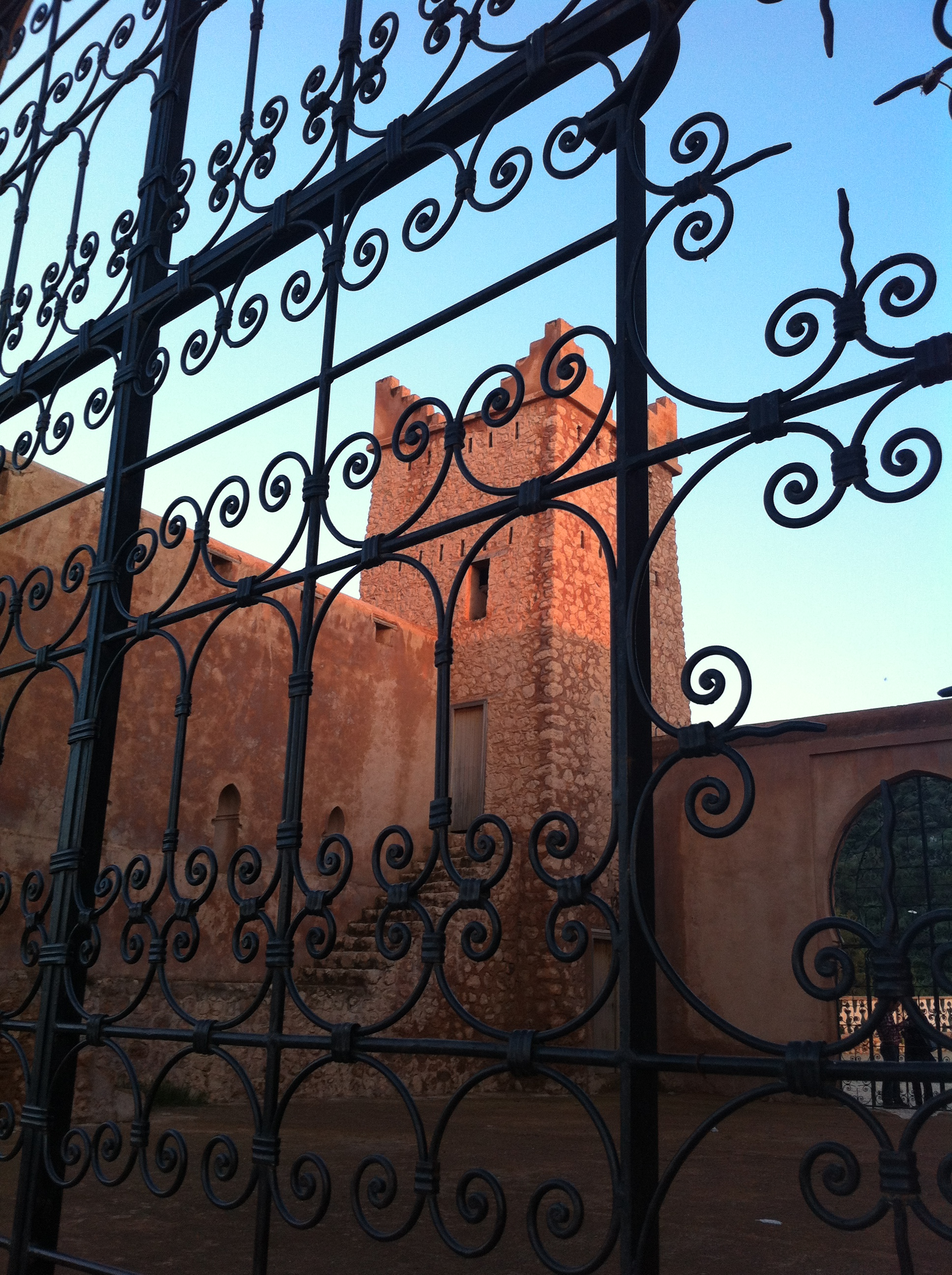
View inside the Kasbah

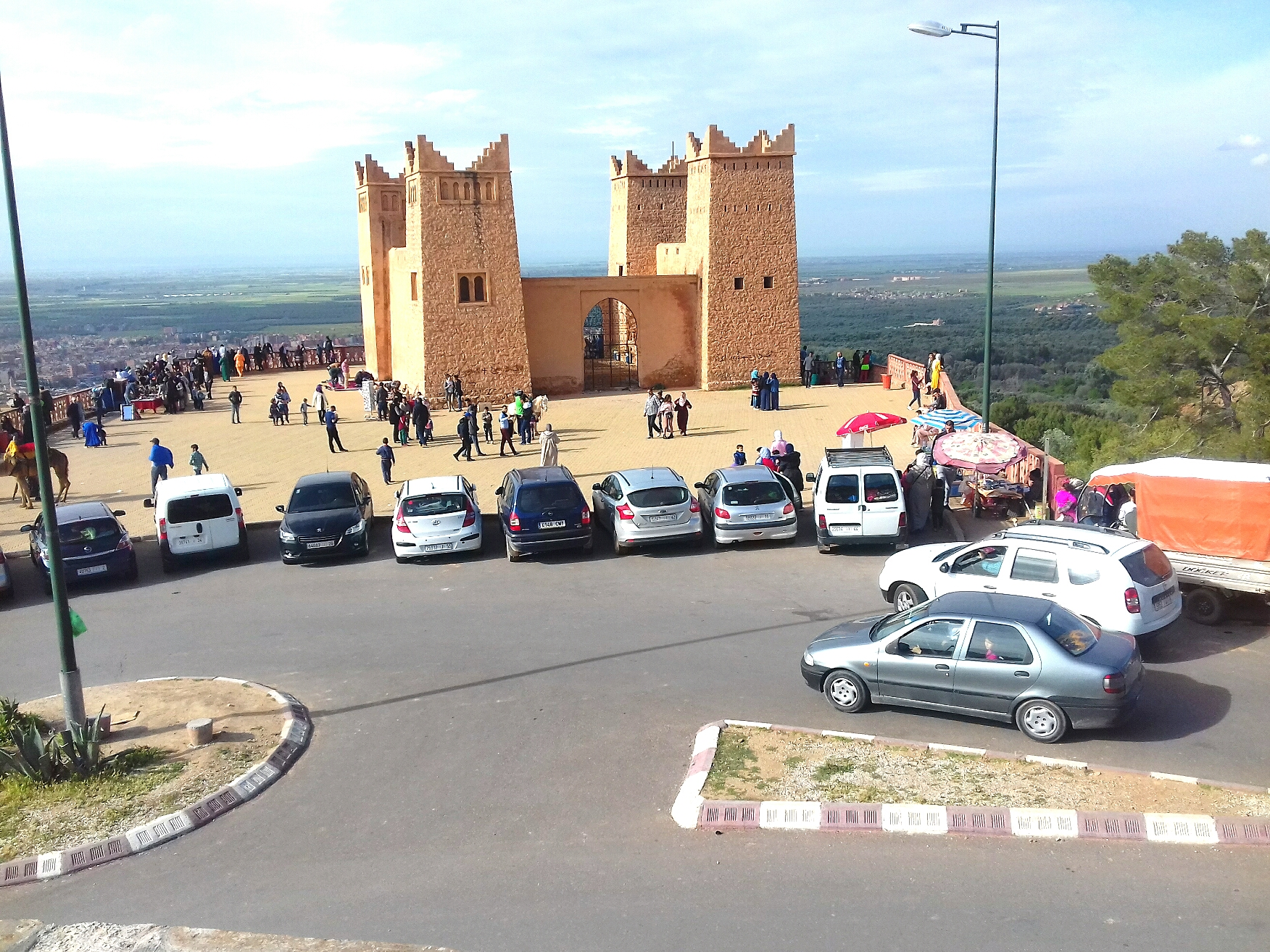
The Kasbah is also accessible by car
