= Oulad M'Barek =

- Rural commune
- Location within Morocco
- Coordinates: 32°16′40″N 6°27′15″W
- Country: Morocco
- Region: Béni Mellal-Khénifra
- Province: Béni Mellal

Population (2004)
  - Total: 17,578
- Time zone: UTC+0 (GMT)

Oulad M'Barek is a town and rural commune in Béni Mellal Province, Béni Mellal-Khénifra, Morocco. At the time of the 2004 census, the commune had a total population of 17,578 people living in 3193 households.
