= Foum El Anceur =

Foum El Anceur فم العنصر ⵉⵎⵉ ⵍⵄⴰⵏⵚⴰⵔⵜ Imi Lansart
- Rural commune and town
- Interactive map of Foum El Anceur
- Coordinates: 32.3718°N 6.2613°W
- Country: Morocco
- Region: Béni Mellal-Khénifra
- Province: Béni Mellal

Population (2004)
  - Total: 13,795
- Time zone: UTC+0 (GMT)

Foum El Anceur is a town and rural commune in Béni Mellal Province, Béni Mellal-Khénifra, Morocco. At the time of the 2004 census, the commune had a total population of 13,795 people living in 2590 households.
