= Boutferda =

- Rural commune and town
- Interactive map of Boutferda
- Coordinates: 32°21′22″N 5°49′58″W
- Country: Morocco
- Region: Béni Mellal-Khénifra
- Province: Béni Mellal

Population (2004)
  - Total: 6,333
- Time zone: UTC+0 (GMT)

Boutferda is a town and rural commune in Béni Mellal Province, Béni Mellal-Khénifra, Morocco. At the time of the 2004 census, the commune had a total population of 6,333 people, living in 1,020 households.
