= Dir El Ksiba =

- Rural commune and town
- Interactive map of Dir El Ksiba
- Coordinates: 32.5259°N 6.1532°W
- Country: Morocco
- Region: Béni Mellal-Khénifra
- Province: Béni Mellal

Population (2004)
  - Total: 19,130
- Time zone: UTC+0 (GMT)

Dir El Ksiba is a town and rural commune in Béni Mellal Province, Béni Mellal-Khénifra, Morocco. At the time of the 2004 census, the commune had a total population of 19,130 people living in 3626 households.
