= Ait Oum El Bekht =

- Rural commune and town
- Interactive map of Ait Oum El Bekht
- Coordinates: 32.3567°N 5.8927°W
- Country: Morocco
- Region: Béni Mellal-Khénifra
- Province: Béni Mellal

Population (2004)
  - Total: 9,893
- Time zone: UTC+0 (GMT)

Ait Oum El Bekht is a town and rural commune in Béni Mellal Province, Béni Mellal-Khénifra, Morocco. At the time of the 2004 census, the commune had a total population of 9893 people living in 1807 households.
