= Bni Oukil =

- Rural commune and town
- Location within Morocco
- Country: Morocco
- Region: Béni Mellal-Khénifra
- Province: Fquih Ben Salah

Population (2004)
  - Total: 14,960
- Time zone: UTC+0 (GMT)

Bni Oukil is an Arab town and rural commune in Fquih Ben Salah Province, Béni Mellal-Khénifra, Morocco. At the time of the 2004 census, the commune had a total population of 14,960 people living in 2351 households.
