= Bradia =

- Town
- Location in Morocco
- Coordinates: 32°26′N 6°32′W
- Country: Morocco
- Region: Béni Mellal-Khénifra
- Province: Fquih Ben Salah

Population (2004)
  - Total: 6,564
- Time zone: UTC+0 (GMT)

Bradia is a town in Fquih Ben Salah Province, Béni Mellal-Khénifra, Morocco. According to the 2004 census it has a population of 6,564.
