= Taghzirt =

Tagzirt ⵜⴰⴳⵣⵉⵔⵜ ancien Afza
- Rural commune and town
- Interactive map of Tagzirt
- Coordinates: 32°26′N 6°11′W
- Country: Morocco
- Region: Béni Mellal-Khénifra
- Province: Béni Mellal

Population (2004)
  - Total: 18,942
- Time zone: UTC+0 (GMT)

Tagzirt is a town and rural commune in Béni Mellal Province, Béni Mellal-Khénifra, Morocco. At the time of the 2004 census, the commune had a total population of 18,942 people living in 3712 households.
