= Oulad Zmam =

- Rural commune and town
- Location within Morocco
- Country: Morocco
- Region: Béni Mellal-Khénifra
- Province: Fquih Ben Salah

Population (2014)
  - Total: 33,652
- Time zone: UTC+0 (GMT)

Oulad Zmam is a town and rural commune in Fquih Ben Salah Province, Béni Mellal-Khénifra, Morocco. At the time of the 2004 census, the commune had a total population of 31,905 people living in 4949 households.
