= Foum Oudi =

Foum Oudi فم اودي
- Rural commune and town
- Location within Morocco
- Coordinates: 32.2777°N 6.4278°W
- Country: Morocco
- Region: Béni Mellal-Khénifra
- Province: Béni Mellal

Population (2004)
  - Total: 7,802
- Time zone: UTC+0 (GMT)

Foum Oudi is a town and rural commune in Béni Mellal Province, Béni Mellal-Khénifra, Morocco. At the time of the 2004 census, the commune had a total population of 7802 people living in 1404 households.
