= Bni Chegdale =

- Rural commune and town
- Location within Morocco
- Coordinates: 32.4441°N 6.9551°W
- Country: Morocco
- Region: Béni Mellal-Khénifra
- Province: Fquih Ben Salah

Population (2004)
  - Total: 11,582
- Time zone: UTC+0 (GMT)

Bni Chegdale is an Arab town and rural commune in Fquih Ben Salah Province, Béni Mellal-Khénifra, Morocco. At the time of the 2004 census, the commune had a total population of 11,582 people living in 1872 households.
