= Naour =

Naour may refer to:

- Naour, Jordan
- Naour, Morocco
