= Oulad Bourahmoune =

- Rural commune and town
- Location within Morocco
- Coordinates: 32.2954°N 6.6668°W
- Country: Morocco
- Region: Béni Mellal-Khénifra
- Province: Fquih Ben Salah

Population (2004)
  - Total: 13,635
- Time zone: UTC+0 (GMT)

Oulad Bourahmoune is a town and rural commune in Fquih Ben Salah Province, Béni Mellal-Khénifra, Morocco. At the time of the 2004 census, the commune had a total population of 13,635 people living in 2,118 households.
