= Sidi Jaber =

Coordinates: 32°23′N 6°25′W

Sidi Jaber سيدي جابر
- Town
- Interactive map of Sidi Jaber
- Country: Morocco
- Region: Béni Mellal-Khénifra
- Province: Béni Mellal

Population (2004)
  - Total: 4,693
- Time zone: UTC+0 (GMT)

Sidi Jaber is a town in Béni-Mellal Province, Béni Mellal-Khénifra, Morocco. According to the 2004 census it has a population of 4,693.

== See also ==
- Sidi Gaber
