= Al Khalfia =

- Rural commune and town
- Location within Morocco
- Coordinates: 32.5163°N 6.5386°W
- Country: Morocco
- Region: Béni Mellal-Khénifra
- Province: Fquih Ben Salah

Population (2004)
  - Total: 14,341
- Time zone: UTC+0 (GMT)

Al Khalfia is a town and rural commune in Fquih Ben Salah Province, Béni Mellal-Khénifra, Morocco. At the time of the 2004 census, the commune had a total population of 14,341 people living in 2555 households.
