= Semguet =

- Rural commune and town
- Interactive map of Semguet
- Coordinates: 32.5515°N 6.1869°W
- Country: Morocco
- Region: Béni Mellal-Khénifra
- Province: Béni Mellal

Population (2004)
  - Total: 11,122
- Time zone: UTC+0 (GMT)

Semguet is a town and rural commune in Béni Mellal Province, Béni Mellal-Khénifra, Morocco. At the time of the 2004 census, the commune had a total population of 11,122 people living in 2035 households.
