= Bou Hmara =

Pretender to the throne of Morocco from 1902 to 1909

Jīlālī bin Idrīs al-Yūsufī al-Zarhūnī الجيلالي بن إدريس اليوسفي الزرهوني
- Pretender
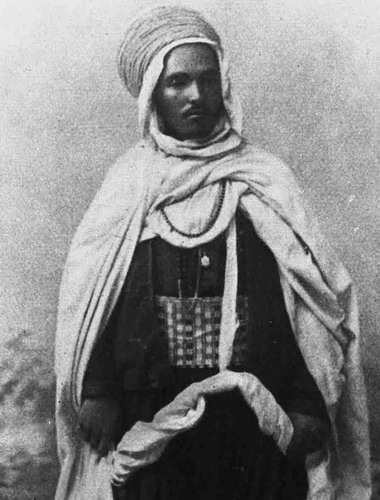
- Born: c. 1860; Oulad Youssef, Morocco
- Died: 12 September 1909; Fes, Morocco

Jīlālī ibn Idrīs al-Yūsufī al-Zarhūnī (Arabic: الجيلالي بن إدريس اليوسفي الزرهوني; c. 1860 – 1909), commonly known as El Rogui, El Roghi or Bou Hmara, was a pretender to the throne of Morocco in the period 1902–1909, during the reign of Abdelaziz and Abd al-Hafid.

== Name ==
His given name was Jilali ibn Idris al-Yusufi al-Zarhuni deriving from his birthplace being the village Ouled Youssef in the Zerhoun area near Fes. It is alternatively written as Djilali ben Driss Zerhouni el Youssefi. Alternatively, his name is given as Omar ez-Zarhouni.

He was known as El Rogui (الرُقي ar-Ruqī) meaning "the pretender". This name comes from an earlier pretender from the Gharb region in Morocco called Jilali al-Rughi, who was from Rawagha fraction of the Sufyan, hence the nisba al-Rughi.

He was also known by his opponents by the nickname Bou Hmara (بو حمارة Bū Ḥmāra)—also spelled Bu Himara, Bou Hamara or Bouhmara — which is the colloquial form of Abū Ḥimāra. Bou Hmara literally means "the man on/with a female donkey" because like many religious rebels in North Africa he rode a donkey. According to the historian Edmund Burke III, his name refers to the Moroccan army custom of parading recaptured deserters on the back of a donkey backwards to the amusement of soldiers. Riffians referred to him as Bu Tghyutsh for a similar reason.

== Early life ==
Jilali ibn Idris al-Yusufi al-Zarhuni was born in 1865 and was a Jebli peasant or tribesman from an Arab clan known as the Awlad Yusuf which settled near Zerhoun. According to French diplomat Eugène Aubin, he was an Arabized Berber. He was educated at Al-Qarawiyyin and studied religion alongside Mahdi al-Munabbhi. He trained in Hassan I's student engineer corps (tulba muhandis) studying as a student engineer (talib al-muhandis) in the 1880s. He became a minor makhzen official and originally held the position of secretary to one of the viziers. He also was the scribe of the brother of Abd al-Aziz, Abu Hafs. He was imprisoned in 1894 by the regent Ba Ahmed for forgery.

== Pretender ==
After release, he spent the next few years travelling to French Algeria and French Tunisia, whence he returned (riding a female donkey) to Taza in the northeast of Morocco with the idea of impersonating Moulay Mohammed, another brother of the Sultan. Moulay Mohammed was venerated by the Moroccan public as a saintly figure, but although still alive and well, he kept to the royal palace in Fes and was almost never seen in public. Under this assumed identity, Bou Hmara proclaimed himself Sultan of Morocco. This was at the end of 1902, when he was about 40 years old.

He is said to have ruled ruthlessly in Taza and the surrounding area of the Rif and Nekor. He persecuted the Jews, who had to take refuge in neighbouring areas. He is said to have executed some of his opponents by soaking the victims in petrol, then setting them alight at night.

While ensconced in Taza, he was able to repel all attempts by the Sultan's army to invade his domain. However, by 1909, he had enlarged his area of control, and could not retain the loyalty of all the many different tribes it encompassed. In addition, he had alienated some of these tribes by selling mining concessions to Spanish interests.

By then the Sultan was Moulay Abdelhafid, a more vigorous ruler than Abdelaziz. Abdelhafid first attempted to discredit Bou Hmara by taking the real Moulay Mohammed, who was up until now imprisoned by the Sultan Abdelaziz, to a public mosque; but this caused a near riot and was not repeated. Fearing that Bou Hmara was expanding towards Fes, Abdelhafid sent another army against him, armed with cannon manned by French artillery instructors. During the resulting battle, the cannon were used to shell a religious shrine where Bou Hmara had taken refuge, and he was captured.

== Death ==
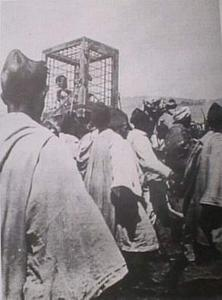
Bou Hmara in a cage in 1909

After his capture in August 1909, Bou Hmara was paraded through Fez in a wooden cage and then tortured. He was put in a pit with lions by Abd al-Hafid of Morocco. They were too well-fed to do anything but maul him so he was eventually killed by a servant and his body burned. He died on 12 or 15 September 1909.

Bou Hmara's men were either decapitated on the spot, or taken hostage. It is said that 400 prisoners began the march to Fes but only 160 arrived, the remainder having been ransomed. Once at Fes, one-fifth of the captives were punished at a public mutilation, a hand and opposing foot being cut off (hirabah), and the others imprisoned.

== Legacy and reception ==
Bou Hmara as a figure fascinated colonial writers more than his revolt. Because of his sudden rise, personality, ability as a military leader and defiance against the central government, he became a folk hero. The circumstances of his death also exacerbated his legend which persisted in the imagination of Moroccans long after his defeat.

He had a reputation for magic and prestidigitation. He surrounded himself with "a halo of miracles, prophecies and dreams" and is said to have done a number of miracles like his face changing colour three times a day. He attributed this to the claim that he was actually Mawlay Mohammed, the rightful heir to and eldest son of Hassan I.

His campaign exacerbated the makhzen's financial problems at the time by undermining the sultan's legitimacy and necessitating military expeditions against him.

== Sources ==
- Dunn, Ross E. (1980). "Bū Ḥimāra's European Connexion: The Commercial Relations of a Moroccan Warlord". The Journal of African History. 21 (2): 235–253. ISSN 0021-8537.
- Dunn, Ross E. (1981). "The Bu Himara Rebellion in Northeast Morocco: Phase I". Middle Eastern Studies. 17 (1): 31–48. ISSN 0026-3206.
- Burke III, Edmund (1976). Prelude to Protectorate in Morocco: Pre-Colonial Protest and Resistance, 1860-1912. University of Chicago Press. ISBN 978-0-226-08084-0.
- Le Glay, Maurice. La Mort du Rogui. Berger-Levrault, Paris (consulted 7th edition, 1926).
- Maxwell, Gavin. Lords of the Atlas. (A modern classic, various editions, ISBN 0-907871-14-3).
