= Zaouiat Cheikh =

Coordinates: 32°38′29″N 5°55′14″W

- Town
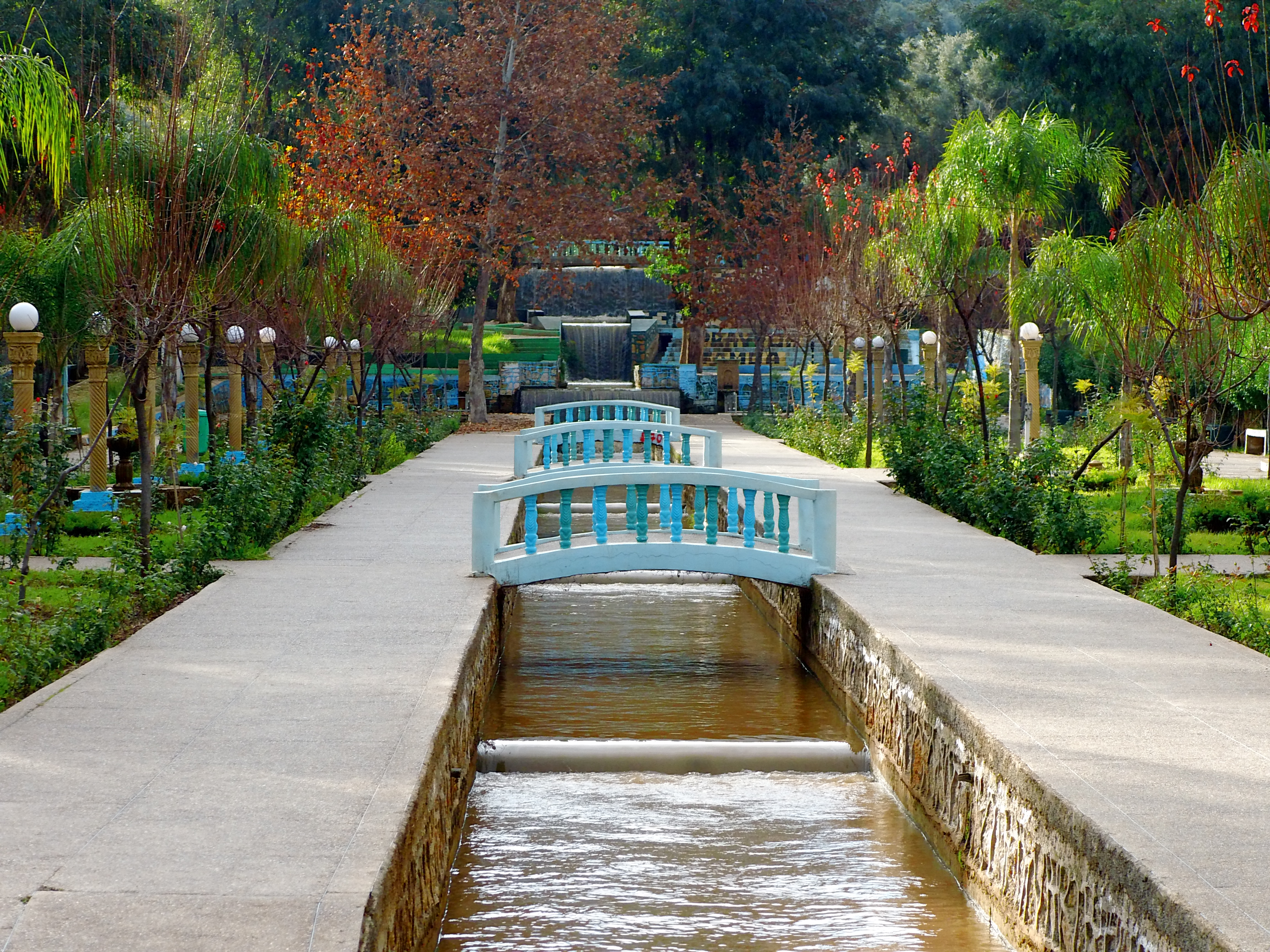
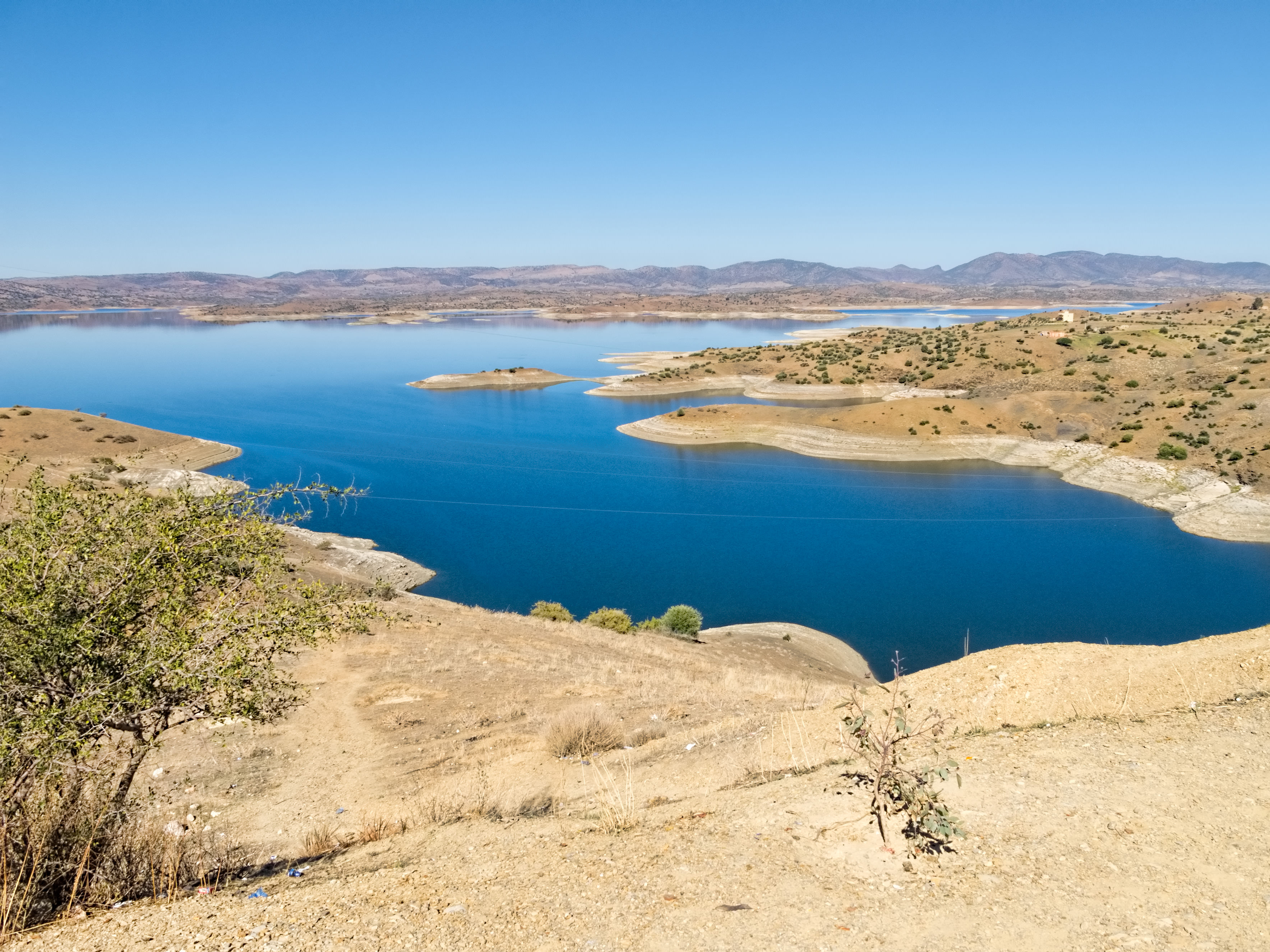
- Tamda spring Martyr Ahmed Al Hansali dam Aguelmam Zaouiat Cheikh
- Interactive map of Zaouiat Cheikh
- Country: Morocco
- Region: Béni Mellal-Khénifra
- Province: Béni Mellal

Population (2024)
  - Total: 25,088
- Time zone: UTC+0 (GMT)

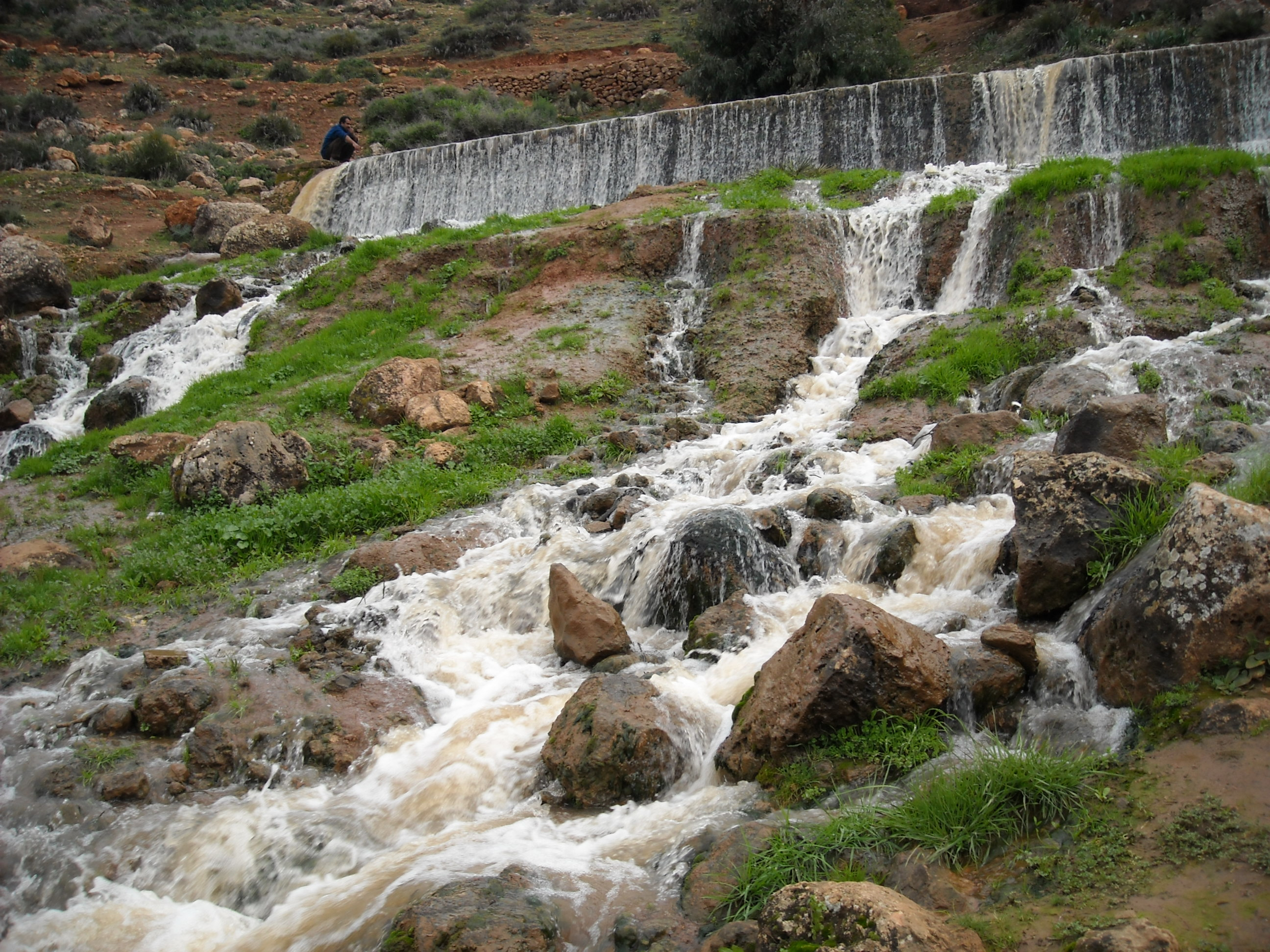
Tamda waterfall in Zaouiat Cheikh

Zaouiat Cheikh is a town in Béni-Mellal Province, Béni Mellal-Khénifra, Morocco. According to the 2004 census it has a population of 22,728.
