= Tassemit =

Mountain in Béni Mellal-Khénifra, Morocco

Tassemit ⴰⴷⵔⴰⵔ ⵏ ⵓⴽⵍⵉⵎ تاصميت
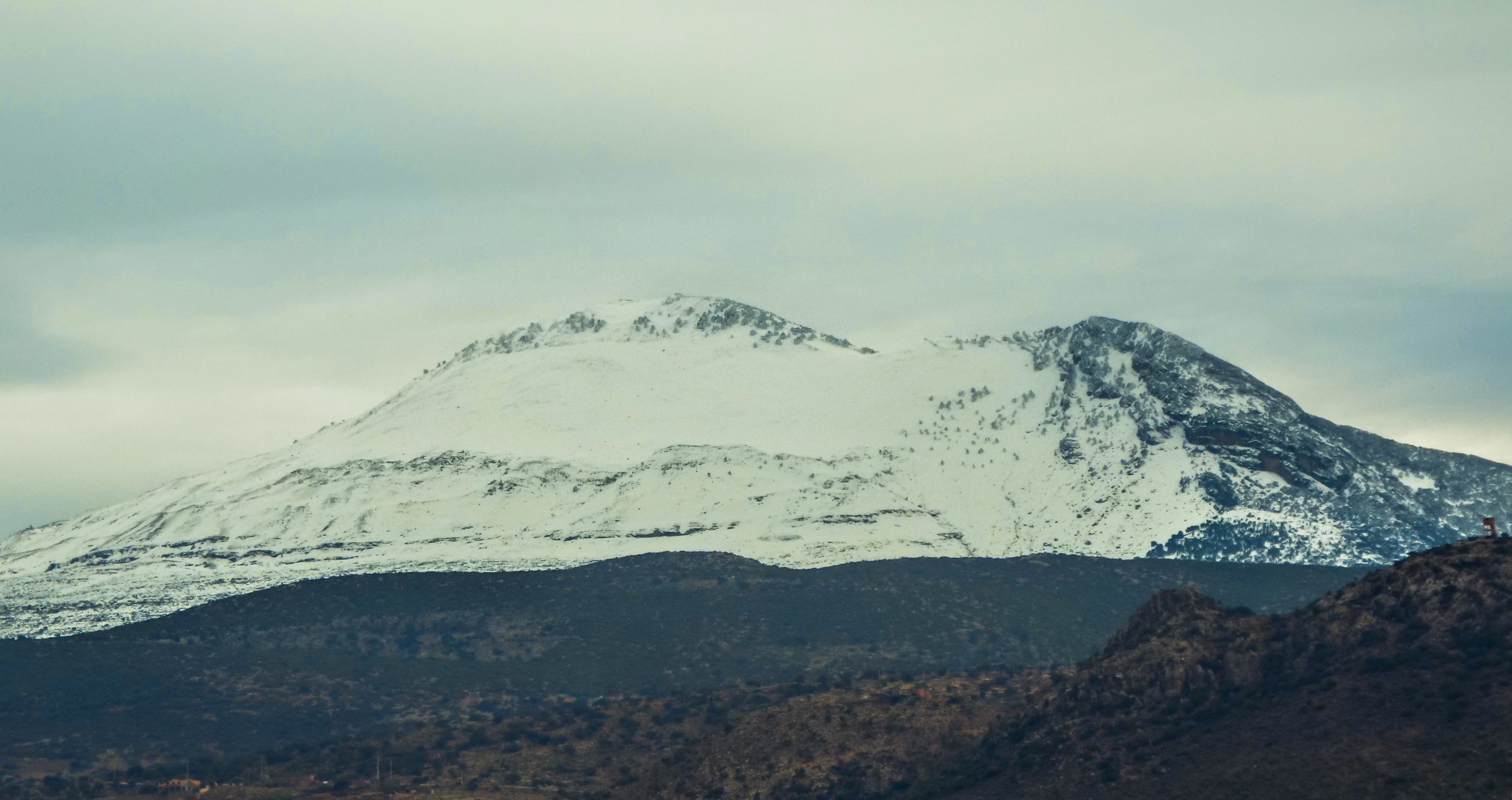

Highest point
- Elevation: 2,205 m (7,234 ft)
- Coordinates: 32°18′14.15″N 6°15′28.69″W

Geography
- Location within Morocco Location within Africa
- Location: Béni Mellal-Khénifra, Morocco
- Parent range: High Atlas

Climbing
- First ascent: Unknown
- Easiest route: From Irhelrher, Azilal Province

Tassemit, or Jbel Tassemit (Berber languages: ⴰⴷⵔⴰⵔ ⵏ ⵓⴽⵍⵉⵎ), is a mountain of the Béni Mellal-Khénifra region of Morocco. Its altitude is 2,205 m.

It is in the High Atlas not far from Beni Mellal, Beni Mellal Province.

The mountain’s name is derived from Berber (Tamazight) and can be translated as ‘Cold Mountain’.

== See also ==
- High Atlas
