= El Ksiba =

- Municipality
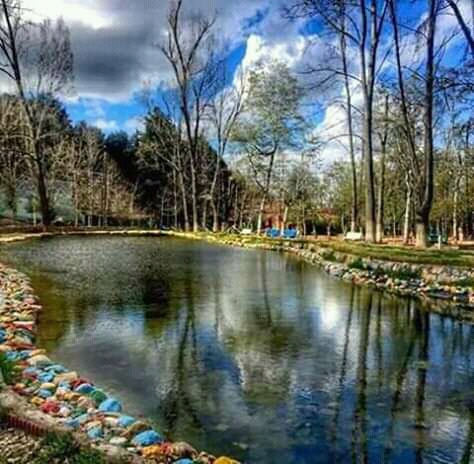
- Interactive map of El Ksiba
- Coordinates: 32°34′5″N 6°1′51″W
- Country: Morocco
- Region: Béni Mellal-Khénifra
- Province: Béni Mellal

Population (2004)
  - Total: 18,481
- Time zone: UTC+0 (GMT)

El Ksiba is a small town in Béni-Mellal Province, Béni Mellal-Khénifra, Morocco. According to the 2004 census it has a population of 18,481.

Temperatures reach below zero in the coldest winters and snow falls in the surrounding countryside. The town is surrounded with various types of trees including olive, almond and pinecone. El Ksiba has several springs and rivers that run through the mountains. The people that inhabit El Ksiba are mostly from the Berber tribes of Morocco.

The Battle of El Ksiba took place here 8–10 June 1913.
