= Krifate =

- Rural commune and town
- Location within Morocco
- Coordinates: 32°34′34″N 6°44′55″W
- Country: Morocco
- Region: Béni Mellal-Khénifra
- Province: Fquih Ben Salah

Population (2004)
  - Total: 34,103
- Time zone: UTC+0 (GMT)

Krifate is a small Arab hilali town and rural commune in Fquih Ben Salah Province, Béni Mellal-Khénifra, Morocco. At the time of the 2004 census, the commune had a total population of 34,103 people living in 5932 households.
