= Oulad Said L'Oued =

Ouled Said L'Oued
- Rural commune and town
- Interactive map of Ouled Said L'Oued
- Coordinates: 32.5440°N 6.3676°W
- Country: Morocco
- Region: Béni Mellal-Khénifra
- Province: Béni Mellal

Population (2004)
  - Total: 13,618
- Time zone: UTC+0 (GMT)

Ouled Said L'Oued is a town and rural commune in Béni Mellal Province, Béni Mellal-Khénifra, Morocco. At the time of the 2004 census, the commune had a total population of 13,618 people living in 2319 households.
