= Dar Oulad Zidouh =

- Rural commune
- Location in Morocco
- Coordinates: 32°19′N 6°54′W
- Country: Morocco
- Region: Béni Mellal-Khénifra
- Province: Fquih Ben Salah

Population (2014)
  - Rural commune: 31,170
  - Urban: 11,491
- Time zone: UTC+0 (GMT)

Dar Oulad Zidouh is a town and rural commune in Fquih Ben Salah Province, Béni Mellal-Khénifra, Morocco. According to the 2004 census the town had a population of 9,821.
