= Kasba Tadla =

Coordinates: 32°36′N 6°16′W

Kasbat Tadla قصبة تادلة
- Town
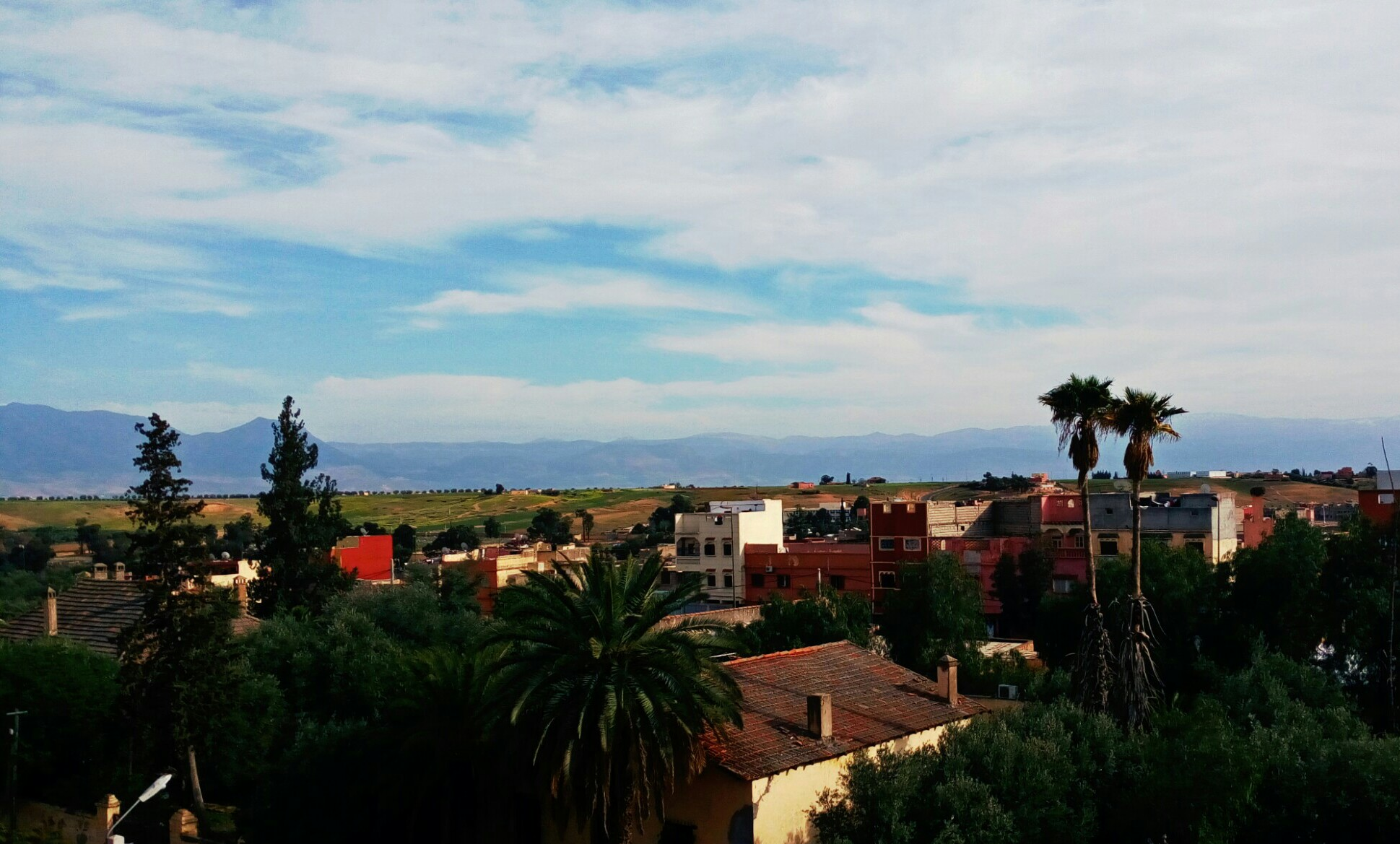
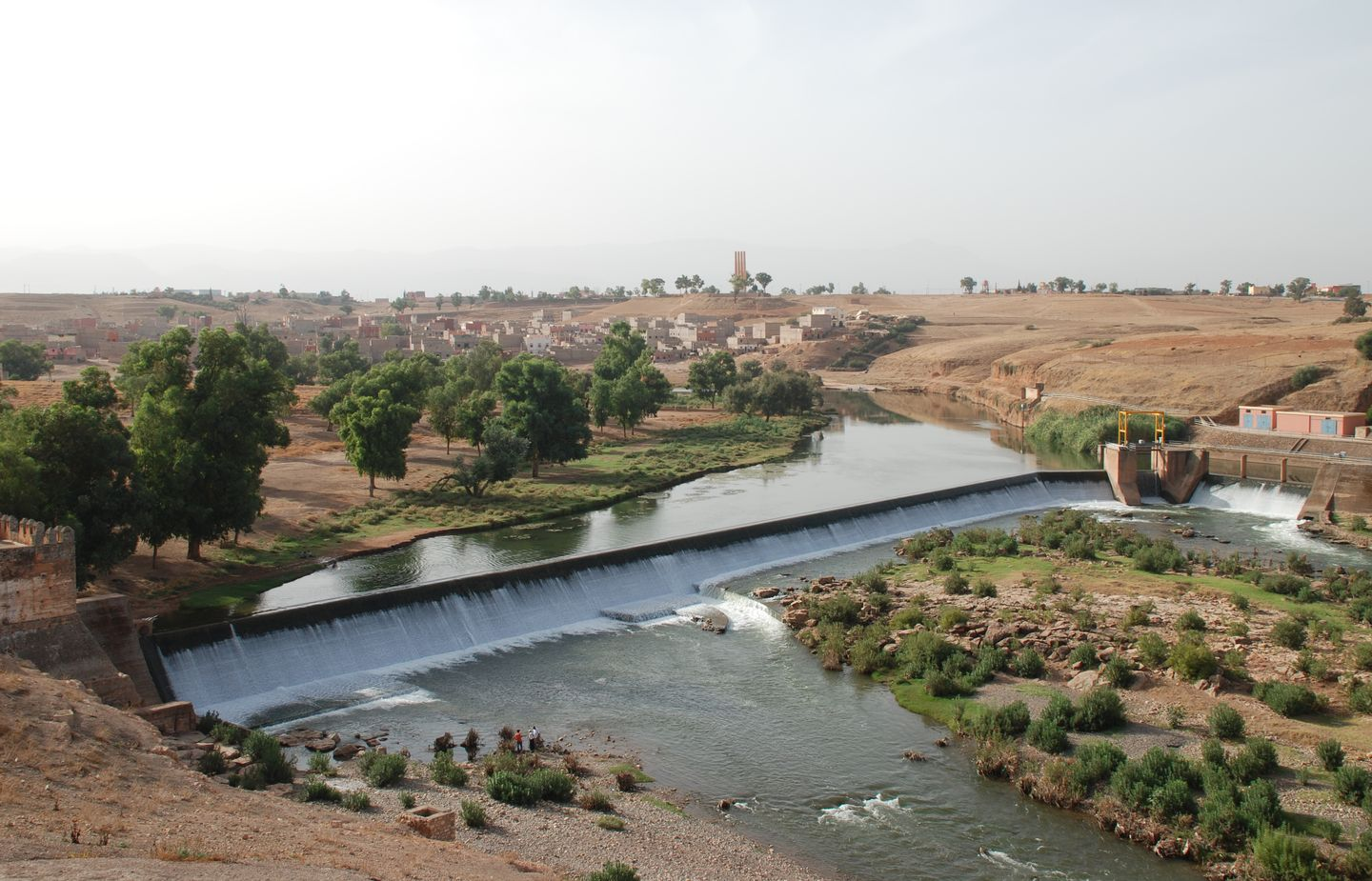
- Interactive map of Kasbat Tadla
- Country: Morocco
- Region: Béni Mellal-Khénifra
- Province: Béni Mellal

Population (2004)
  - Total: 40,898
- Time zone: UTC+0 (GMT)
- Postal code: 23350
- Website: https://communekasbatadla.ma/

Kasba Tadla (Arabic: قصبة تادلة, romanized: Qaṣba Tādlā) is a town in Béni-Mellal Province, Béni Mellal-Khénifra, Morocco. According to the 2004 census, it has a population of 40,898. The highest temperature ever registered in Kasba Tadla was 47.0 °C (116.6 °F), on July 23, 2021.
