= Aghbala =

Rural commune in Morocco

Coordinates: 32°29′N 5°38′W

Aghbala أغبالة
- Town
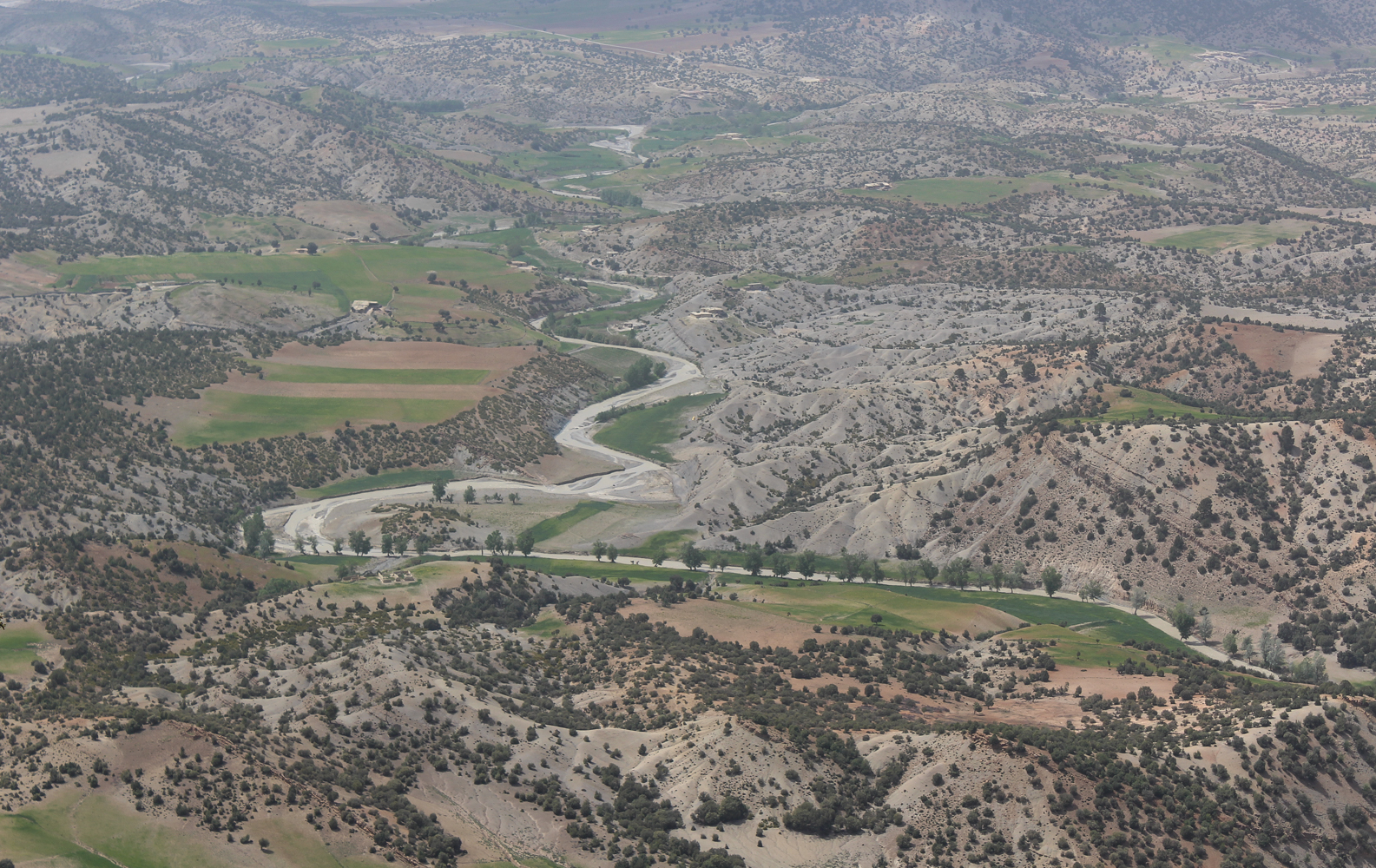
- This picture has been taken somewhere near aghbala city in the region of Beni Mellal – Khénifra .
- Interactive map of Aghbala
- Country: Morocco
- Region: Béni Mellal-Khénifra
- Province: Béni Mellal

Population (2004)
  - Total: 6,300
- Time zone: UTC+0 (GMT)

Aghbala is a town in Béni-Mellal Province, Béni Mellal-Khénifra, Morocco. According to the 2004 census it has a population of 6,300.
