= Guettaya =

- Rural commune and town
- Interactive map of Guettaya
- Coordinates: 32.5644°N 6.2806°W
- Country: Morocco
- Region: Béni Mellal-Khénifra
- Province: Béni Mellal

Population (2004)
  - Total: 14,621
- Time zone: UTC+0 (GMT)

Guettaya is a town and rural commune in Béni Mellal Province, Béni Mellal-Khénifra, Morocco. At the time of the 2004 census, the commune had a total population of 14,621 people living in 2603 households.
