= Fquih Ben Salah Province =

Coordinates: 32.505°N 6.686°W

Fquih Ben Salah Province إقليم الفقيه بن صالح
- Province
- Interactive map of Fquih Ben Salah Province
- Country: Morocco
- Region: Béni Mellal-Khénifra
- Capital: Fquih Ben Salah

Area
  - Total: 3,250 km^{2} (1,250 sq mi)

Population (2024)
  - Total: 475,893

Fquih Ben Salah (Arabic: إقليم الفقيه بن صالح) is a province in the Moroccan region of Béni Mellal-Khénifra. Its population in 2024 is 475,893.

== Administrative divisions ==
Name	Geographic code	Type	Households	Population (2004)	Foreign population	Moroccan population	Notes
Fquih Ben Salah	091.01.05.	Municipality	16889	82446	18	82428	
Oulad Ayad	091.01.09.	Municipality	3910	21466	2	21464	
Souk Sebt Oulad Nemma	091.01.11.	Municipality	9477	51049	37	51012	
Dar Ould Zidouh	091.05.01.	Rural commune	4307	27615	1	27614	9821 residents live in the center, called Dar Oulad Zidouh; 17794 residents live in rural areas.
Had Boumoussa	091.05.03.	Rural commune	5959	41731	1	41730	
Oulad Bourahmoune	091.05.05.	Rural commune	2118	13635	2	13633	
Oulad Nacer	091.05.07.	Rural commune	3918	26527	0	26527	
Oulad Zmam	091.05.09.	Rural commune	4949	31905	1	31904	
Sidi Aissa Ben Ali	091.05.11.	Rural commune	3735	22697	2	22695	
Sidi Hammadi	091.05.13.	Rural commune	2430	14535	0	14535	
Al Khalfia	091.09.01.	Rural commune	2555	14341	0	14341	
Bni Chegdale	091.09.03.	Rural commune	1872	11582	0	11582	
Bni Oukil	091.09.05.	Rural commune	2351	14960	1	14959	
Bradia	091.09.07.	Rural commune	6236	36307	1	36306	6564 residents live in the center, called Bradia; 29743 residents live in rural areas.
Hel Merbaa	091.09.09.	Rural commune	2159	12614	0	12614	
Krifate	091.09.11.	Rural commune	5932	34103	0	34103	
