= Oulad Ayad =

Oulad Ayad ⵓⵍⴰⴷ ⴰⵢⴰⴷ
- Town
- Location within Morocco
- Coordinates: 32°12′00″N 6°47′51″W
- Country: Morocco
- Region: Béni Mellal-Khénifra
- Province: Fquih Ben Salah

Population (2004)
  - Total: 21,466
- Time zone: UTC+0 (GMT)

Oulad Ayad (in berber : ⵓⵍⴰⴷ ⴰⵢⴰⴷ) is a town in Fquih Ben Salah Province, Béni Mellal-Khénifra, Morocco. According to the 2004 census it has a population of 21,466.
