= Oulad Yaich =

Coordinates: 32.4167°N 6.33333°W

- Town
- Interactive map of Oulad Yaich
- Country: Morocco
- Region: Béni Mellal-Khénifra
- Province: Béni Mellal

Population (2004)
  - Total: 7,692
- Time zone: UTC+0 (GMT)

Oulad Yaich is a town in Béni-Mellal Province, Béni Mellal-Khénifra, Morocco. According to the 2004 census, it has a population of 7,692.

The town is known for its meat and its exceedingly hot summer weather.
