= Tizi N'Isly =

- Rural commune and town
- Interactive map of Tizi N'Isly
- Coordinates: 32°28′N 5°46′W
- Country: Morocco
- Region: Béni Mellal-Khénifra
- Province: Béni Mellal

Population (2004)
  - Total: 10,060
- Time zone: UTC+0 (GMT)

Tizi N'Isly is a town and rural commune in Béni Mellal Province, Béni Mellal-Khénifra, Morocco. At the time of the 2004 census, the commune had a total population of 10,060 people living in 1806 households.
