= Oulad Youssef =

- Rural commune and town
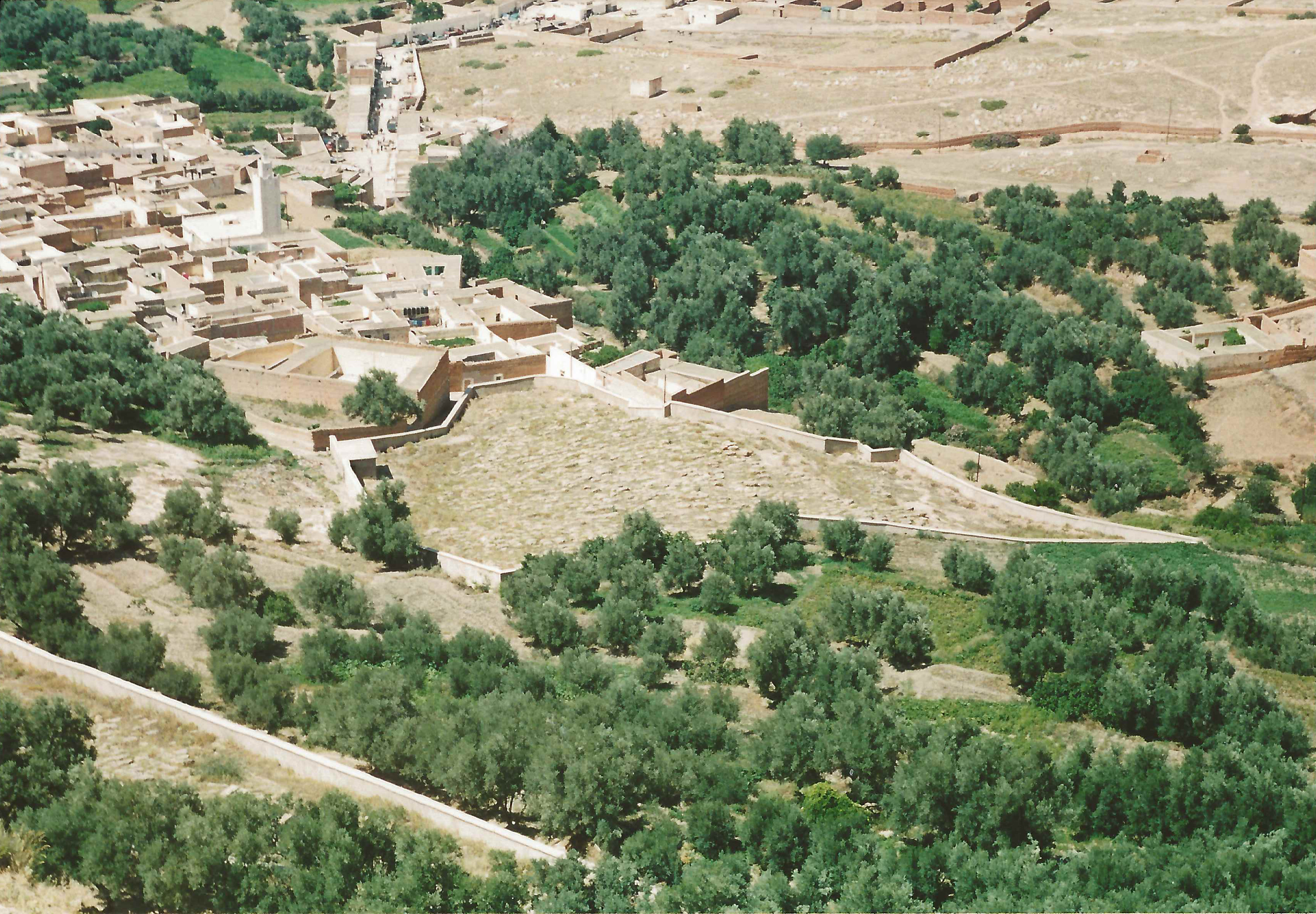
- The Oulad Youssef district of Debdou city in the region Oriental, Morocco.
- Interactive map of Oulad Youssef
- Coordinates: 32.4807°N 6.3769°W
- Country: Morocco
- Region: Béni Mellal-Khénifra
- Province: Béni Mellal

Population (2004)
  - Total: 12,804
- Time zone: UTC+0 (GMT)

Oulad Youssef is a town and rural commune in Béni Mellal Province, Béni Mellal-Khénifra, Morocco. At the time of the 2004 census, the commune had a total population of 12,804 people living in 2138 households.
