= Battle of El Ksiba =

1913 battle in Morocco

- Part of the French conquest of Morocco
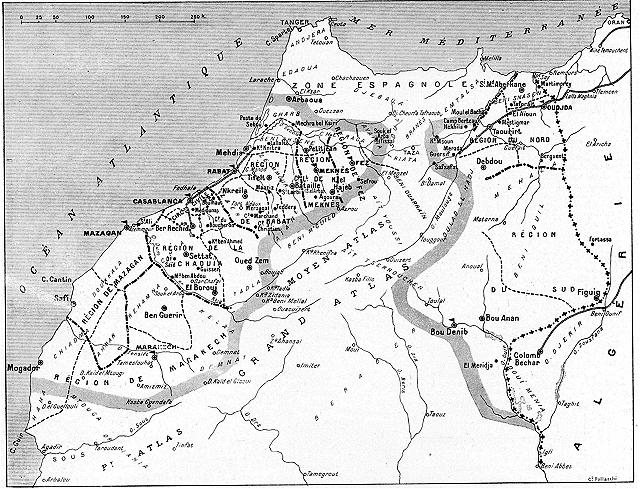
- Occupation of Morocco, May 1913.
Date	8–10 June 1913
Location	El Ksiba, Morocco
Result	French victory

Belligerents
France	Moroccan resistance

Commanders and leaders
Charles Mangin	Unknown

The Battle of El Ksiba took place at El Ksiba in Morocco 8–10 June 1913. It was a battle in the French conquest of Morocco. Despite inflicting greater casualties on their enemy than they sustained themselves, the French Resident-General in Morocco, Hubert Lyautey, held the field commander Charles Mangin responsible for unacceptable losses. Mangin was removed from his command, and soon returned to France.

Following his victory at the Battle of Sidi Bou Othman in September 1912, Mangin had been given the command of Oued Zem.
