= Naour, Morocco =

Naour
- Rural commune and village
- Location within Morocco
- Coordinates: 32°28′49″N 5°54′31″W
- Country: Morocco
- Region: Béni Mellal-Khénifra
- Province: Béni Mellal

Population (2004)
  - Total: 6,433
- Time zone: UTC+0 (GMT)

Naour (Arabic: ناوور) is a village and rural commune in Béni Mellal Province, Béni Mellal-Khénifra, Morocco. At the time of the 2004 census, the commune had a total population of 6433 people living in 1093 households.
