= Beni Mellal Province =

Province of Morocco

Coordinates: 32°20′22″N 6°21′39″W

- Province
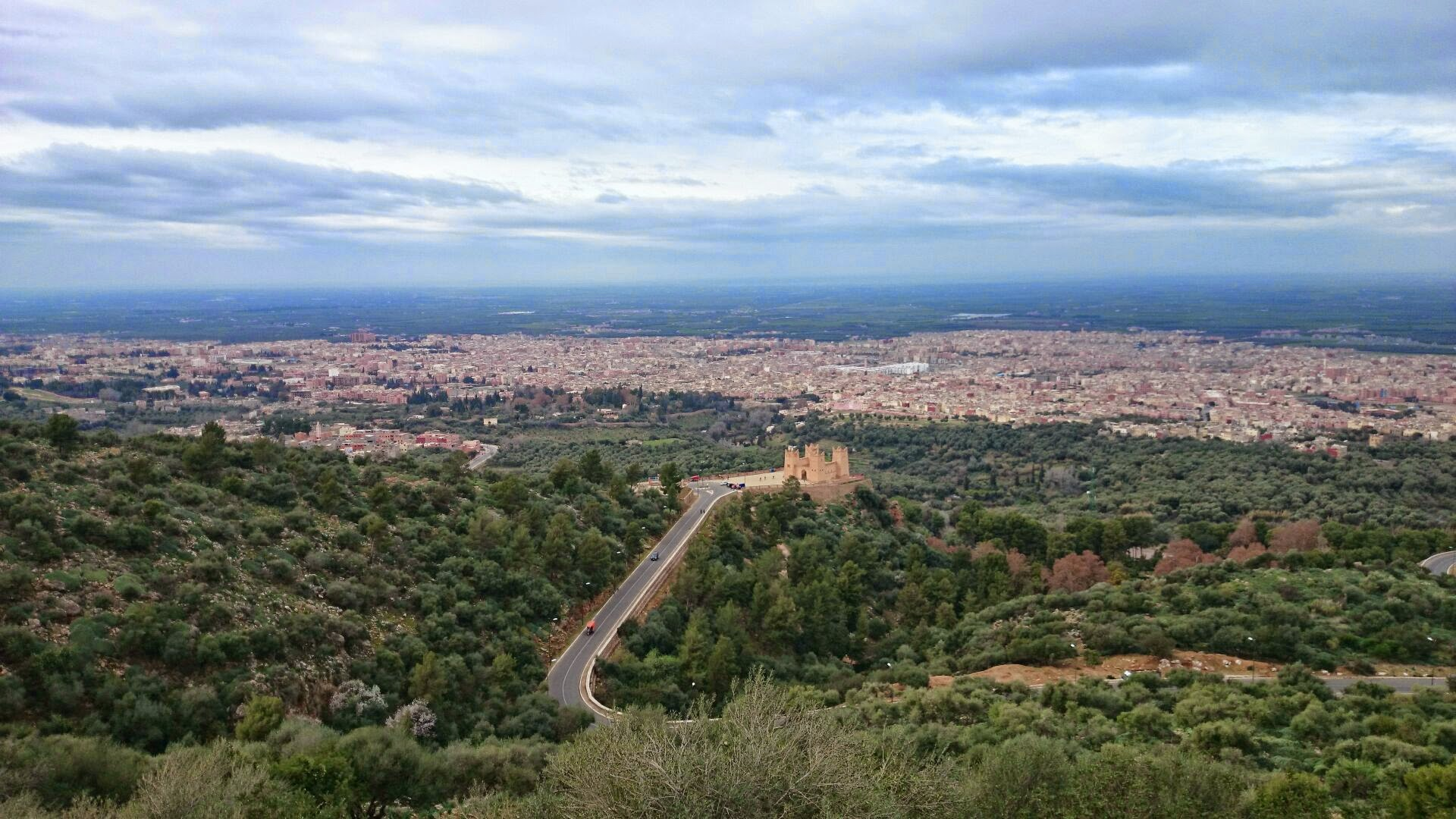
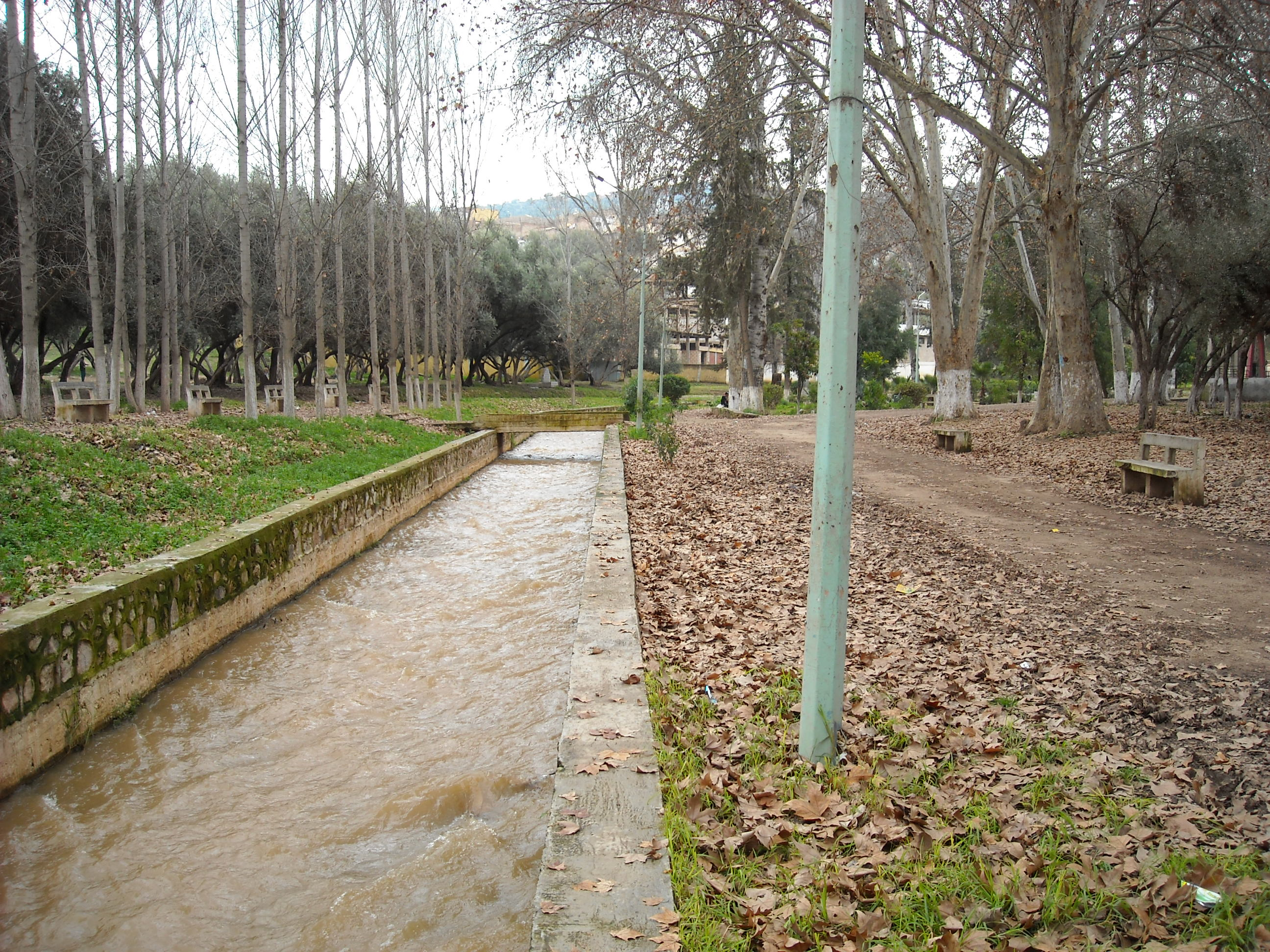
- View of Beni Mellal and the Tadla plain from the High Atlas Tamda spring, Zaouiat Cheikh Ahmed Al Hansali dam
- Interactive map of Beni Mellal Province
- Country: Morocco
- Region: Beni Mellal-Khenifra
- Seat: Beni Mellal

Population (2024)
  - Total: 580,327

Beni Mellal (Arabic: بني ملال) is a province in the Moroccan region of Beni Mellal-Khenifra. Its population in 2024 was 580,327. The provincial capital and namesake is the city of Beni Mellal.

== Geography ==
Beni Mellal Province is located in the Atlas Mountains with a plateau situated 400 to 600 meters above sea level, as well as mountains rising to 2,460 meters (Mount Ighnayen) and 2,240 meters (Mount Tassemit). The high mountains are covered with snow from November to April.

Beni Mellal Province has a continental climate with rainfall varying between 350 and 650 mm depending on the year. November is the rainiest month, with almost 25% of the annual precipitation. Snow is not uncommon on the plateau in winter. Extreme temperatures on the plateau range from a −6 °C in January 2005 to a 47 °C in July 2007. The summer is normally very hot because of the burning easterly or southeasterly winds, known as chergui, which blow off the Sahara and raise the temperature above 40 °C. The heat waves sometimes end in violent thunderstorms.

== Settlements ==
The major cities and towns are:

- Beni Mellal
- El Ksiba
- Kasba Tadla
- Zaouiat Cheikh

== Subdivisions ==
Communes of Beni Mellal Province

The province is divided administratively into the following:

=== Rural communes ===
Name	Geographic code	Households (2024)	Population (2024)	Notes
Aghbala	091.05.01.	3622	13373	Urban centre: Aghbala (7,761 inhabitants; 2,267 households)
Ait Oum El Bekht	091.07.03.	2072	7863	
Boutferda	091.05.05.	1581	7952	
Dir El Ksiba	091.07.07.	6528	25851	Urban centre: Ighram Laalam (11,305 inhabitants; 2,780 households)
Foum El Anceur	091.03.11.	5809	24232	
Foum Oudi	091.03.01.	3810	16256	
Guettaya	091.11.01.	3135	13153	
Naour	091.07.11.	1357	5389	
Oulad Gnaou	091.03.03.	3199	13366	
Oulad M'Barek	091.03.05.	5228	21636	Urban centre: Ouled M'barek (14,832 inhabitants; 3,630 households)
Oulad Said L'Oued	091.11.05.	3354	13441	
Oulad Yaich	091.03.07.	6189	25785	Urban centre: Ouled Yaich (9,681 inhabitants; 2,451 households)
Oulad Youssef	091.11.03.	3290	14247	
Semguet	091.11.07.	1996	8167	
Sidi Jaber	091.03.09.	4306	20455	Urban centre: Sidi Jaber (4,306 inhabitants; 1,132 households)
Taghzirt	091.07.13.	5346	20023	
Tanougha	091.07.15.	3376	13773	
Tizi N'Isly	091.05.17.	2956	12547	

=== Municipalities ===
Name	Geographic code	Households (2024)	Population (2024)
Beni Mellal	091.01.01.	56987	209594
El Ksiba	091.01.03.	5922	19964
Kasba Tadla	091.01.07.	13030	48172
Zaouiat Cheikh	091.01.13.	7304	25088
