= Beni Mellal =

Beni Mellal بني ملال (Arabic) ⴱⵏⵉ ⵎⵍⵍⴰⵍ (Standard Moroccan Tamazight)
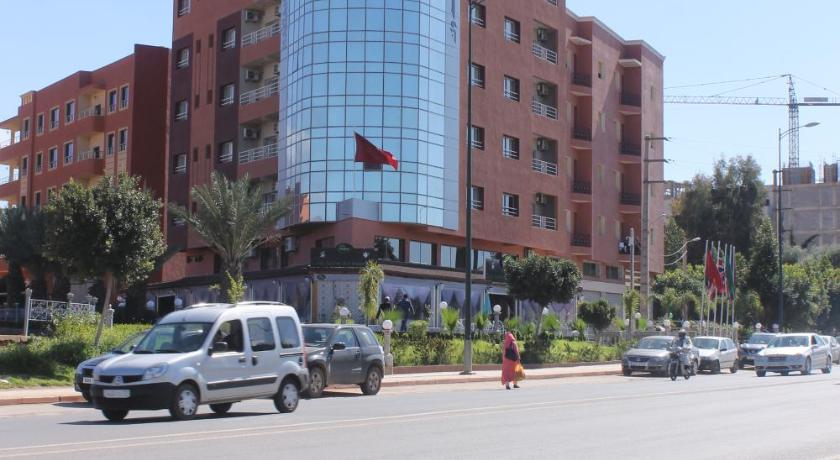
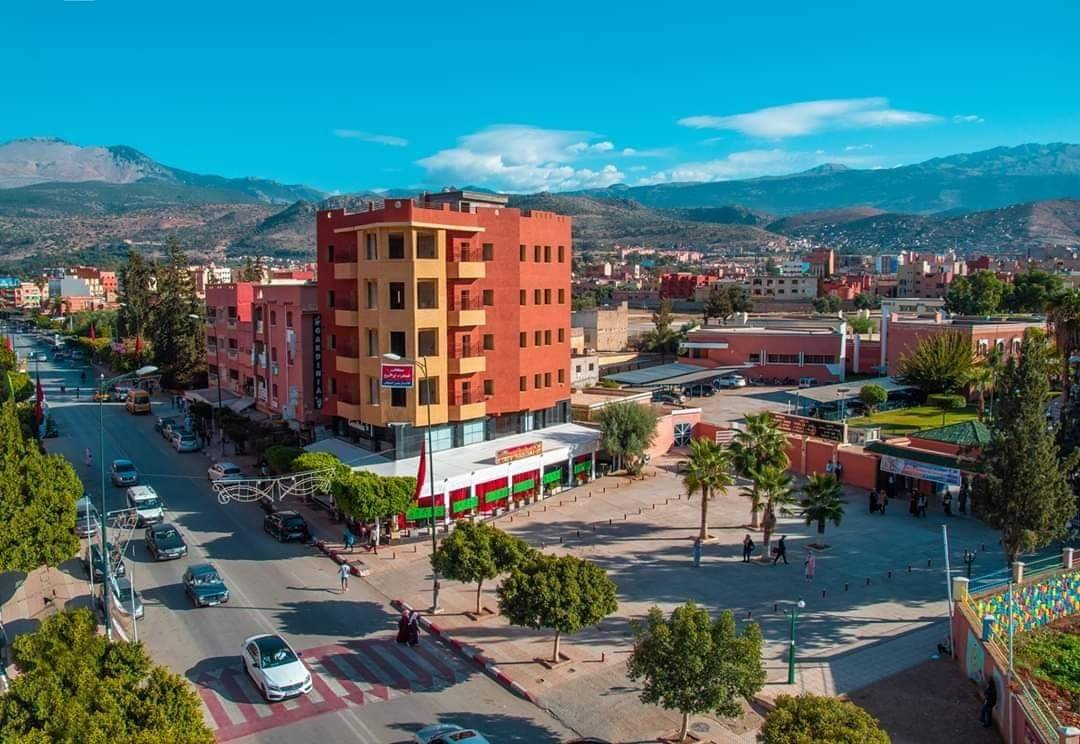
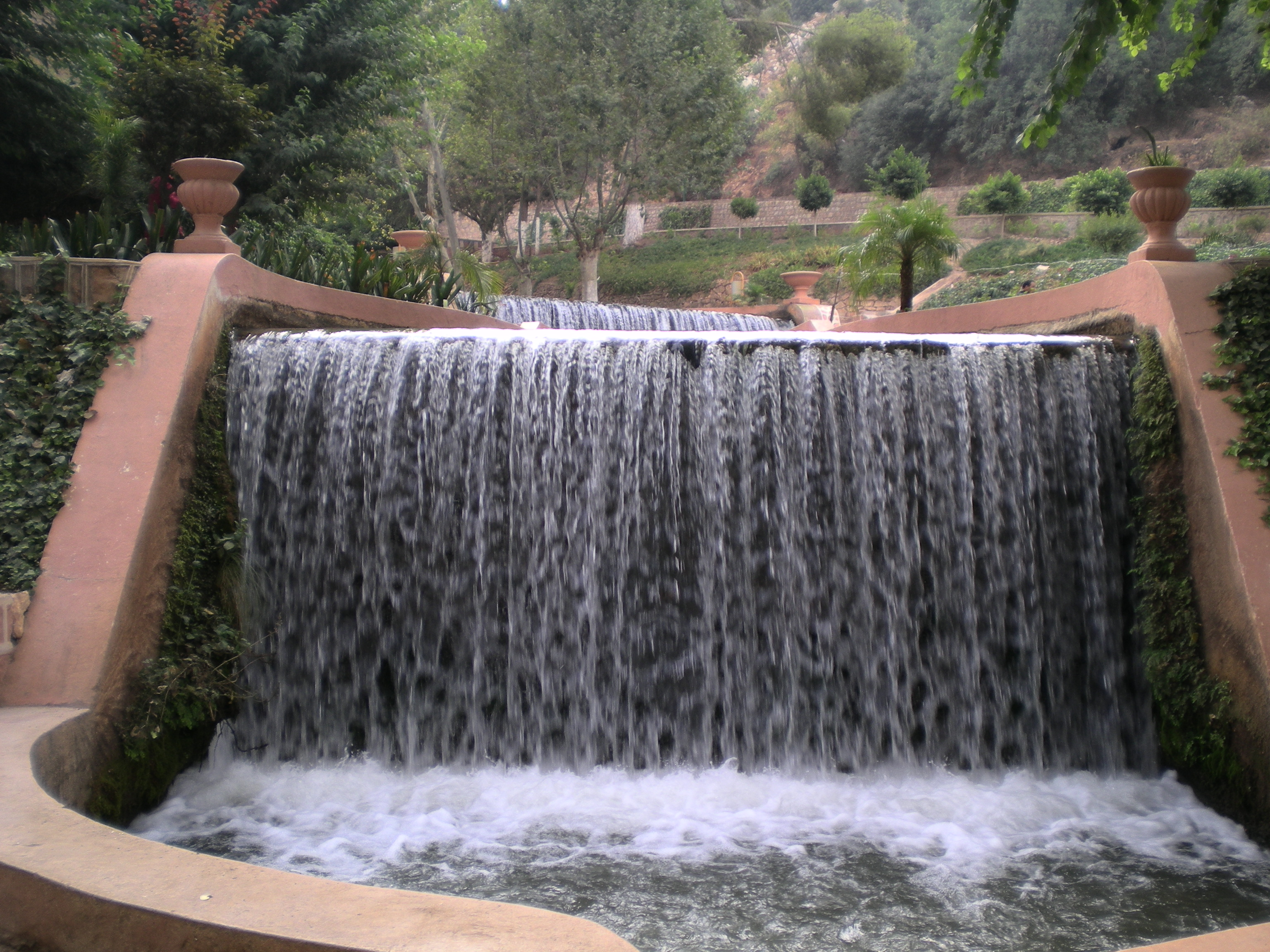
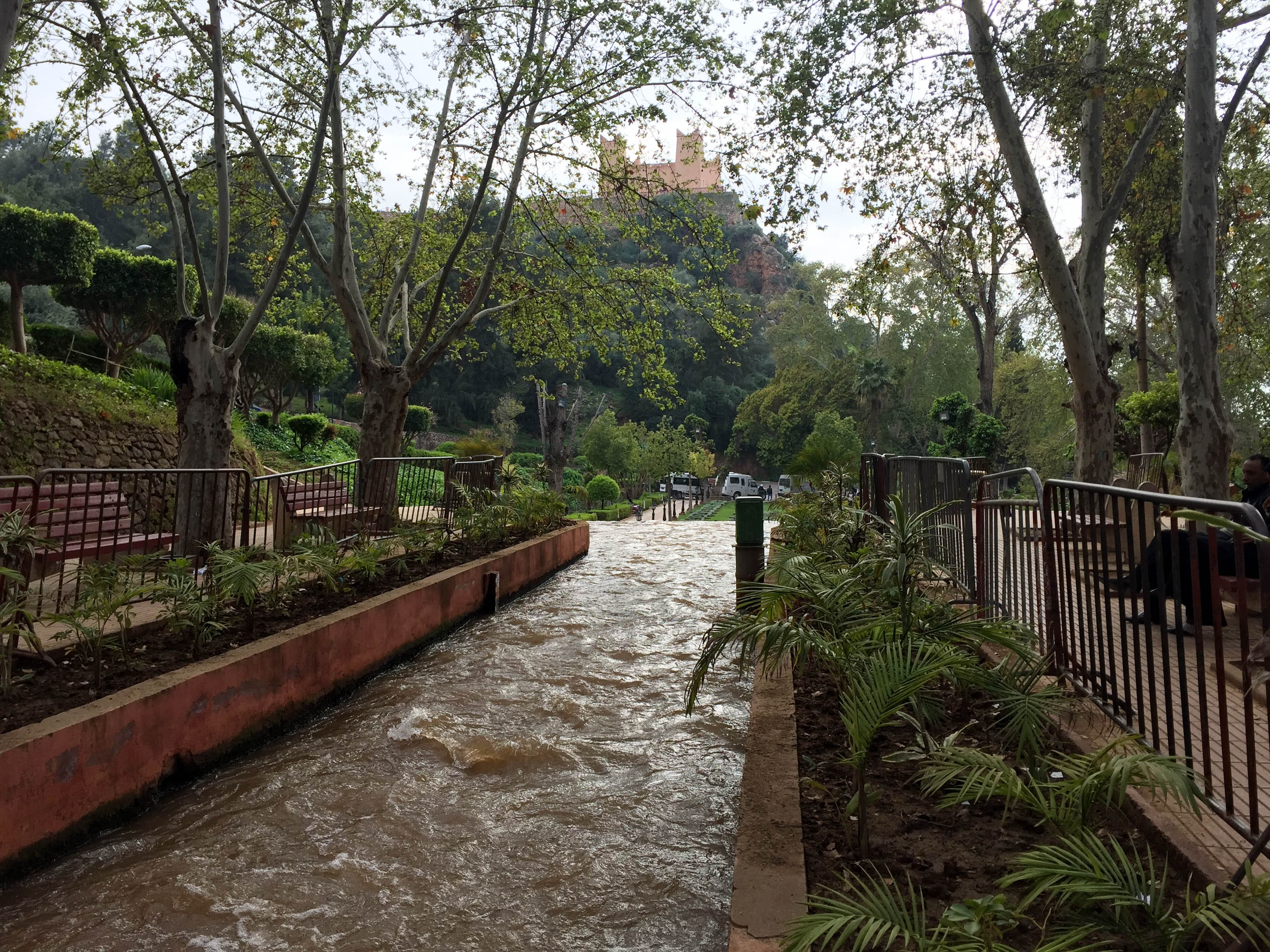
- Interactive map of Beni Mellal
- Coordinates: 32°20′22″N 6°21′39″W
- Country: Morocco
- Region: Béni Mellal-Khénifra
- Province: Beni Mellal
- Elevation: 620 m (2,030 ft)

Population (2024)
  - Total: 209,594
  - Rank: 17th in Morocco
- Time zone: UTC+0 (GMT)
- Postal code: 23000
- Website: communebenimellal.ma

Beni Mellal (Note: Arabic: بني ملال, romanized: Banī Mallāl, Standard Moroccan Tamazight: ⴱⵏⵉ ⵎⵍⵍⴰⵍ) is a city in north-central Morocco. It is the capital of the Béni Mellal-Khénifra Region and has a population of 192,676 (2014 census). It sits at the foot of Jbel Tassemit (2247 m), next to the plains of Beni Amir. The modern town dates back to 1688, when Moulay Isma'il founded a kasbah (fort).

== History ==
Historical Arabic sources do not offer clear details about this site during the medieval period. Hiṣn Daī (Arabic: حصن دائي), a town that was given to the Idrisid prince Yahya ibn Idris (son of Idris II) to rule during the 9th century, may correspond to the site of present Beni Mellal. It was later captured by the Almohads in 1141.

In 1688, the Alawi sultan Moulay Isma'il built a kasbah (fort) here and the current town developed around it. The kasbah was restored in the 19th century by Moulay Sliman and again in 1916 by the French Protectorate administration. In 1918, the town had a recorded population of approximately 3,000. During the Protectorate, authorities invested in the area's agricultural infrastructure, which helped the city grow into a major urban centre. Today it is also regional administrative center.

Formerly, the city was known as Kasbah Beni Mellal and it was also called Kasbah Bel Kush or Bel Kush (Arabic: بلكوش, romanized: Bal Kūsh) with Kush being a Berber word for black.

The etymology places the origin of the name from the tribe living around the city. The Beni Mellal tribe is an Arab tribe of Jusham origin and its eponymous ancestor is said to be Muhammad al-Mallal.

== Climate ==
Beni Mellal has a hot semi-arid climate (Köppen climate classification BSh) with very hot summers and cool winters. As the city lies quite far inland and is shielded by the Middle Atlas mountains, the climate is highly continental. Because of these factors the overall climate can be considered in a fluctuative state generally moderating between two larger extremes in temperature and climate. Rainfall can reach up to 500 mm (20 in) per year, snow can also fall in winter.

Climate data for Beni Mellal (1991-2020)
| Month | Jan | Feb | Mar | Apr | May | Jun | Jul | Aug | Sep | Oct | Nov | Dec | Year |
|---|---|---|---|---|---|---|---|---|---|---|---|---|---|
| Record high °C (°F) | 27.6 (81.7) | 32.0 (89.6) | 35.8 (96.4) | 37.5 (99.5) | 42.4 (108.3) | 45.7 (114.3) | 46.1 (115.0) | 46.0 (114.8) | 42.4 (108.3) | 39.2 (102.6) | 33.5 (92.3) | 29.5 (85.1) | 46.1 (115.0) |
| Mean daily maximum °C (°F) | 18.1 (64.6) | 19.5 (67.1) | 22.6 (72.7) | 25.2 (77.4) | 29.1 (84.4) | 34.0 (93.2) | 37.8 (100.0) | 37.5 (99.5) | 31.9 (89.4) | 28.0 (82.4) | 22.4 (72.3) | 19.1 (66.4) | 27.1 (80.8) |
| Daily mean °C (°F) | 10.5 (50.9) | 12.0 (53.6) | 14.9 (58.8) | 17.5 (63.5) | 21.2 (70.2) | 25.5 (77.9) | 28.9 (84.0) | 28.8 (83.8) | 24.6 (76.3) | 20.5 (68.9) | 15.1 (59.2) | 11.8 (53.2) | 19.3 (66.7) |
| Mean daily minimum °C (°F) | 2.9 (37.2) | 4.4 (39.9) | 7.3 (45.1) | 9.9 (49.8) | 13.3 (55.9) | 17.0 (62.6) | 19.8 (67.6) | 20.1 (68.2) | 17.2 (63.0) | 13.0 (55.4) | 7.7 (45.9) | 4.5 (40.1) | 11.4 (52.5) |
| Record low °C (°F) | −6.0 (21.2) | −3.7 (25.3) | −2.6 (27.3) | 1.7 (35.1) | 3.4 (38.1) | 8.5 (47.3) | 12.5 (54.5) | 13.8 (56.8) | 7.5 (45.5) | 4.3 (39.7) | −2.2 (28.0) | −3.0 (26.6) | −6.0 (21.2) |
| Average rainfall mm (inches) | 33.9 (1.33) | 34.2 (1.35) | 43.0 (1.69) | 36.7 (1.44) | 20.0 (0.79) | 3.5 (0.14) | 1.6 (0.06) | 1.2 (0.05) | 7.2 (0.28) | 35.6 (1.40) | 53.4 (2.10) | 40.0 (1.57) | 310.3 (12.2) |
| Average precipitation days (≥ 1.0 mm) | 5.2 | 5.3 | 5.5 | 4.0 | 3.0 | 1.3 | 0.3 | 0.8 | 1.5 | 3.3 | 5.0 | 5.8 | 41.0 |
Source 1: NOAA
Source 2: BBC Weather (rainfall)

== Transport ==
Beni Mellal is served by Beni Mellal Airport.

== Education ==
In Beni Mellal is located Sultan Moulay Slimane University.

== Notable people ==
- Abde Ezzalzouli - Professional footballer
- Hicham Sigueni - Long-distance runner
- Mohamed El Badraoui - Former footballer

== Gallery ==
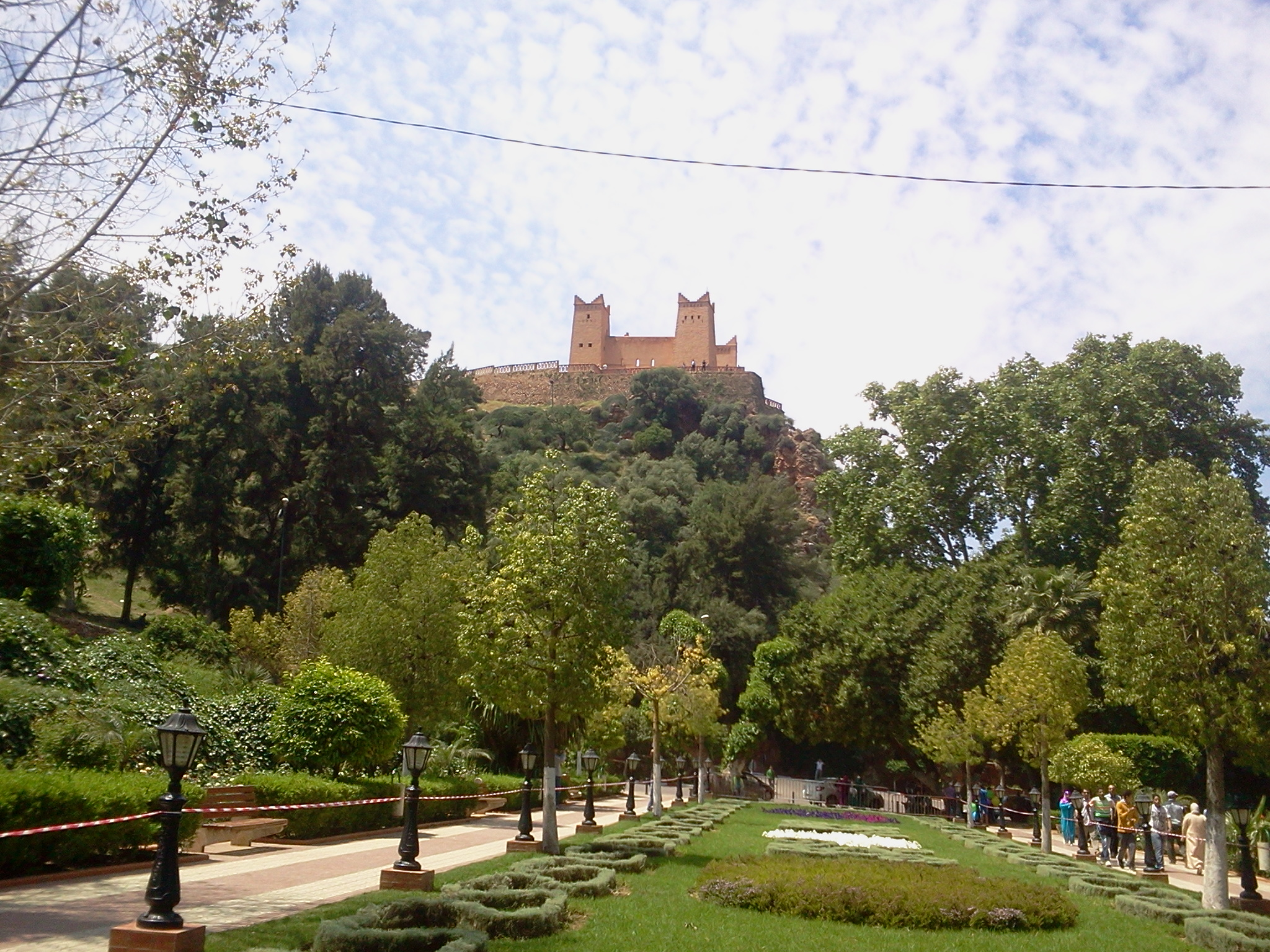

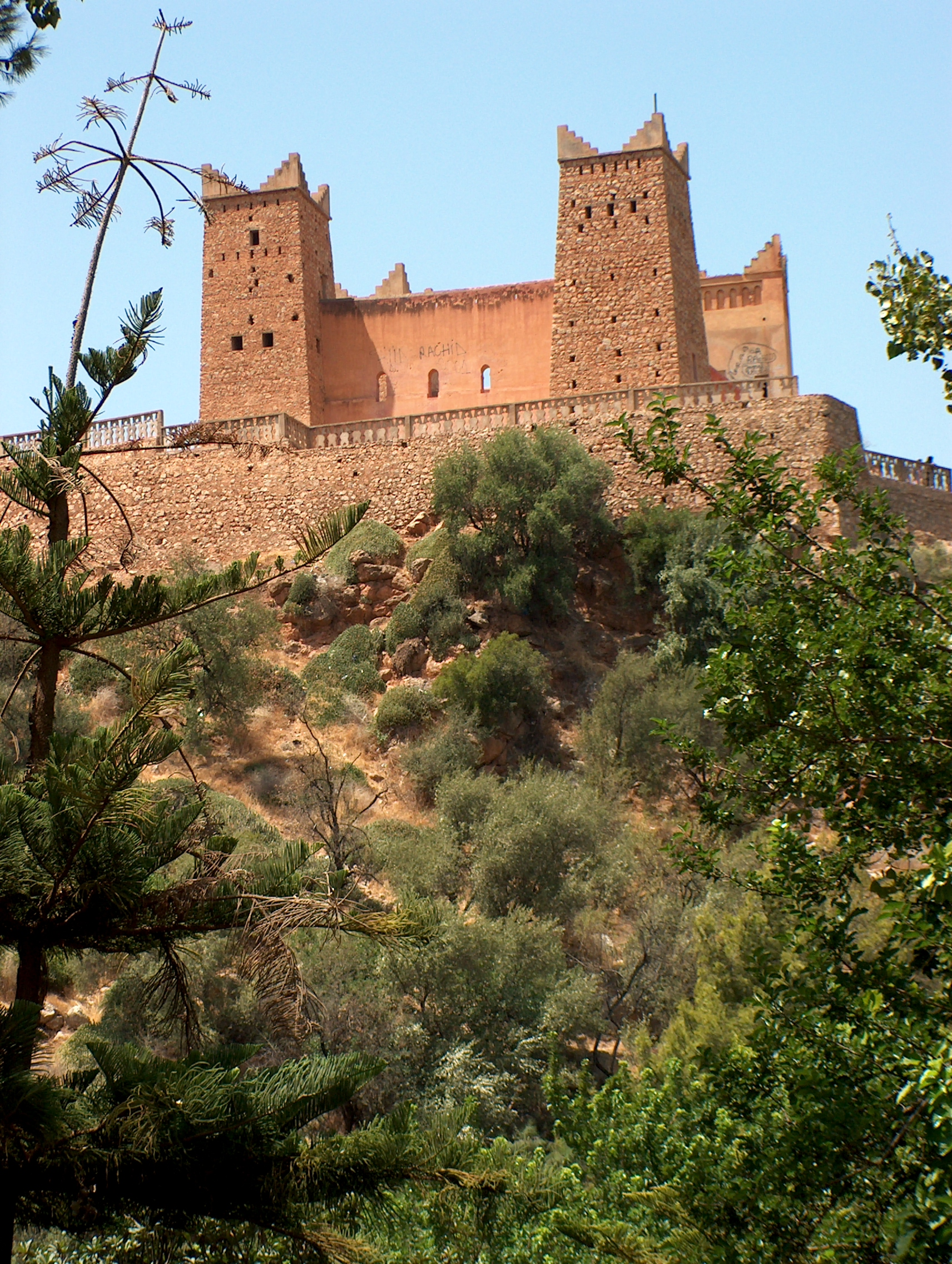
El Kasbah Ain Asserdoun Beni Mellal

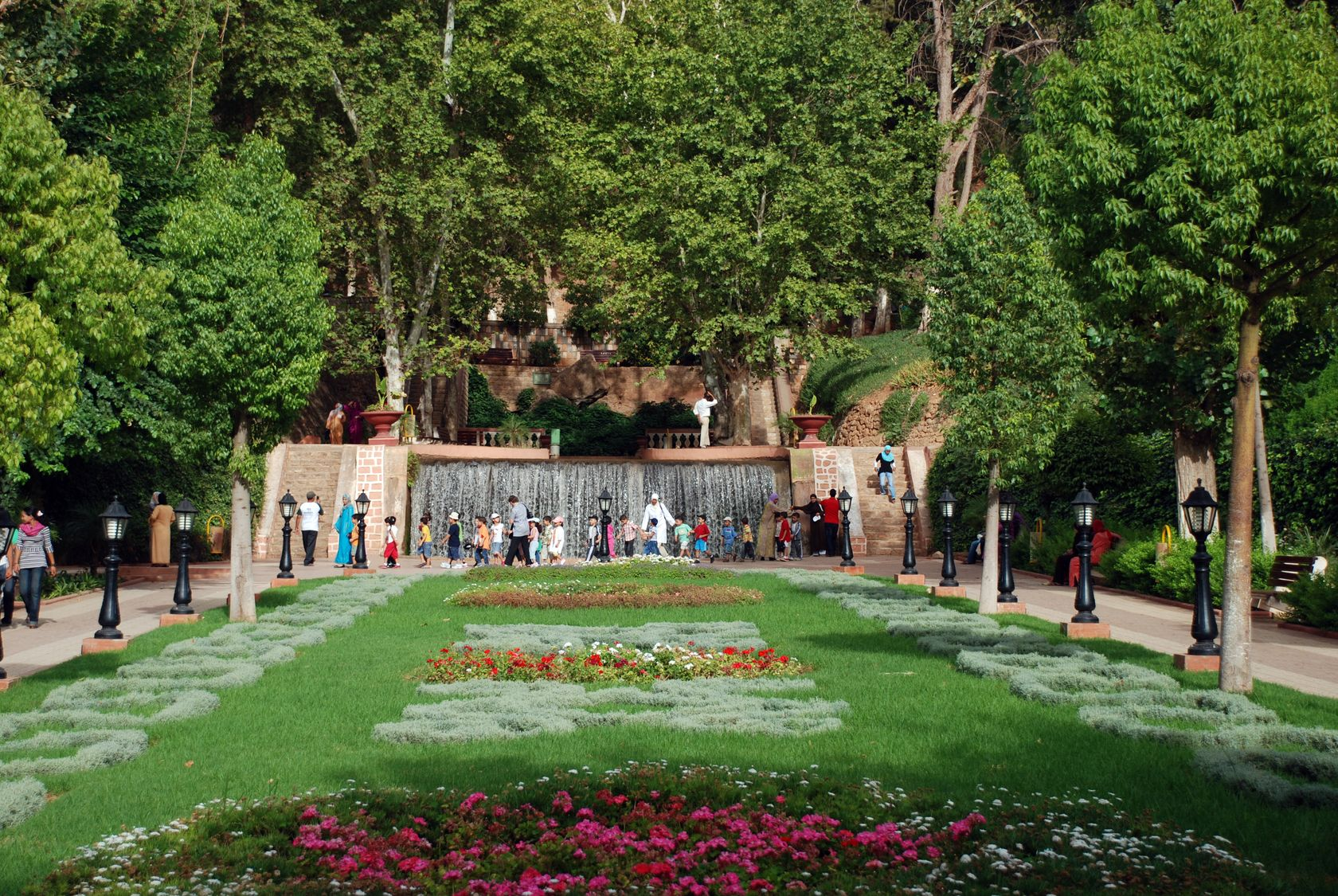

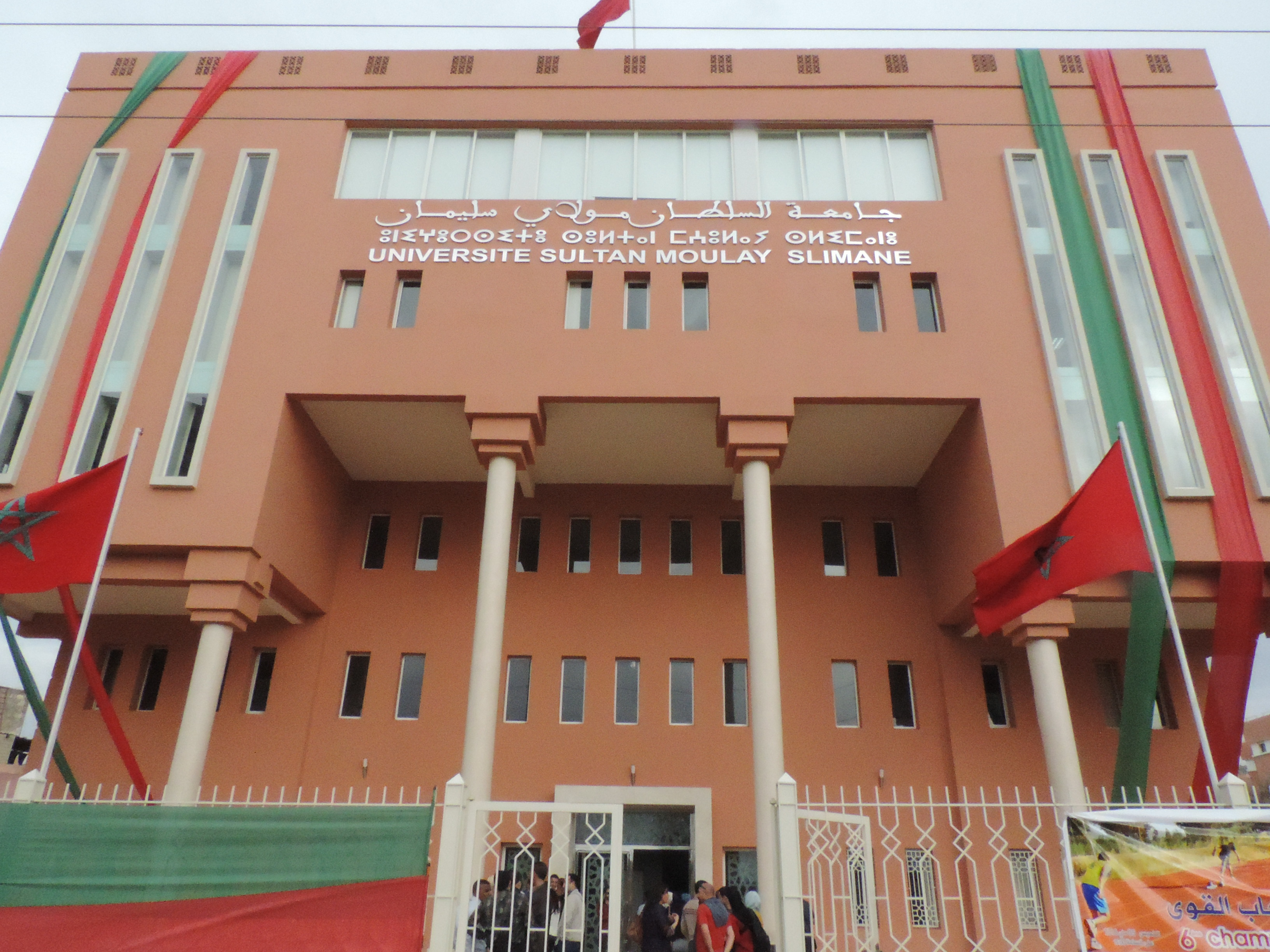
Sultan Moulay Slimane University

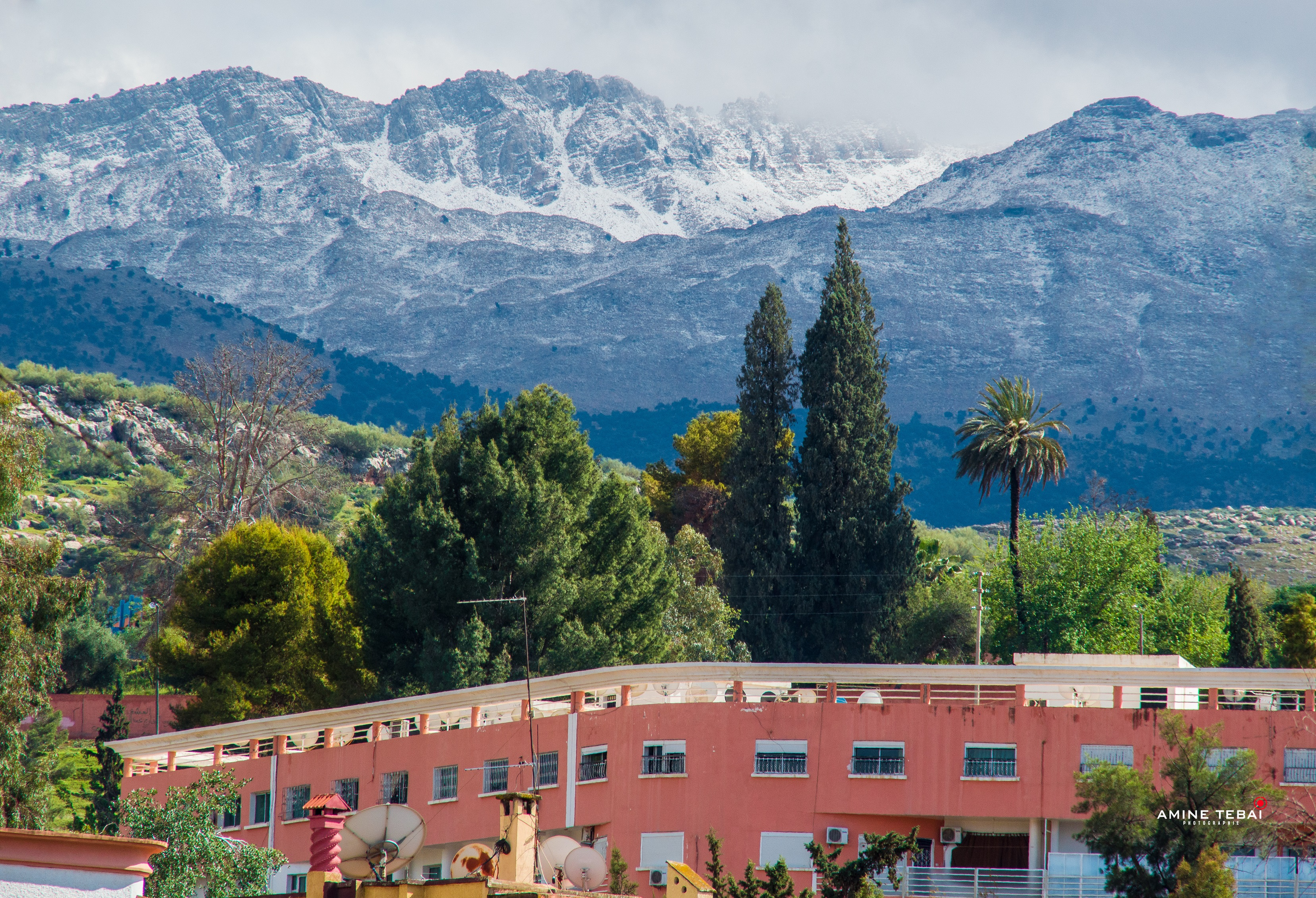
Jbel Ghenim

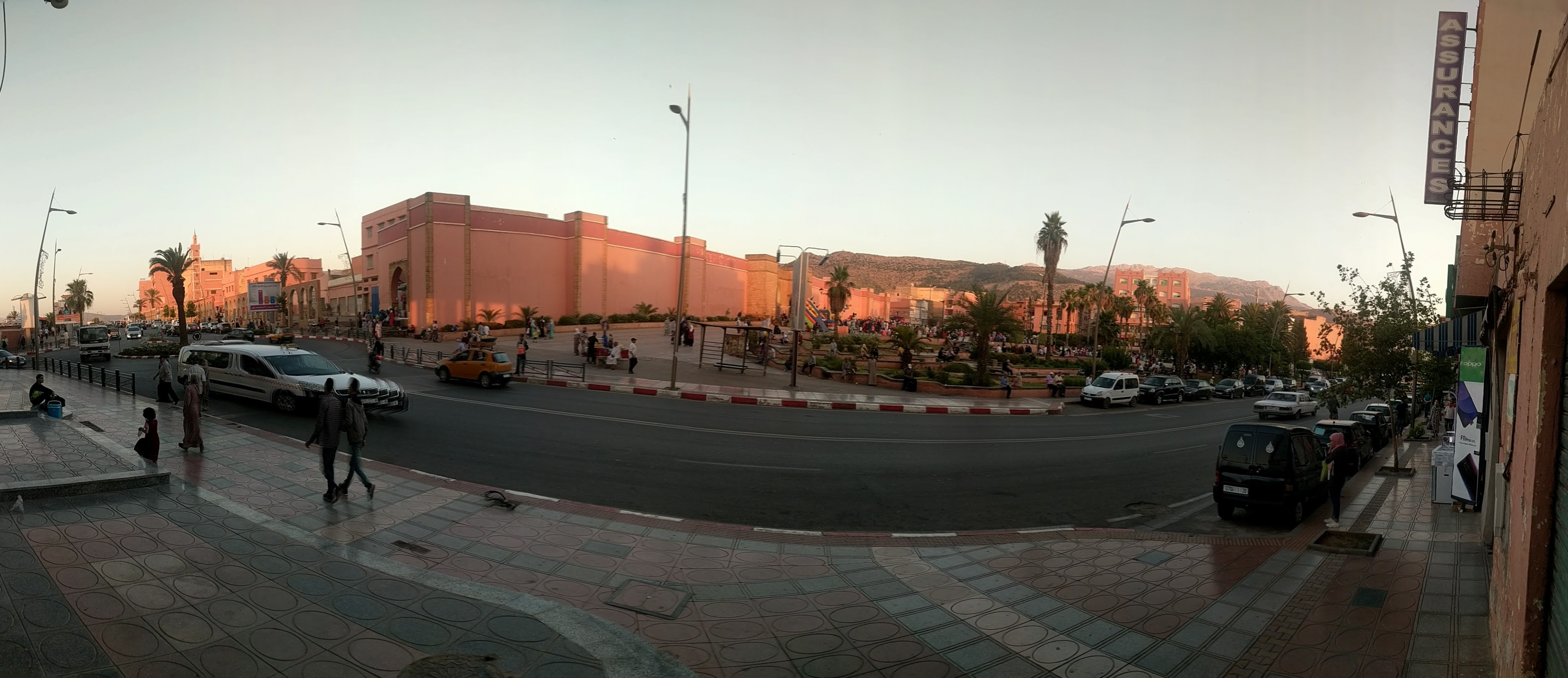
city center
