= Beni Mellal-Khenifra =

Region of Morocco

Beni Mellal-Khenifra Region: جهة بني ملال-خنيفرة (Arabic); ⵜⴰⵎⵏⴰⴹⵜ ⵏ ⴱⵏⵉ ⵎⵍⵍⴰⵍ-ⵅⵏⵉⴼⵔⴰ (Standard Moroccan Tamazight)
- Region
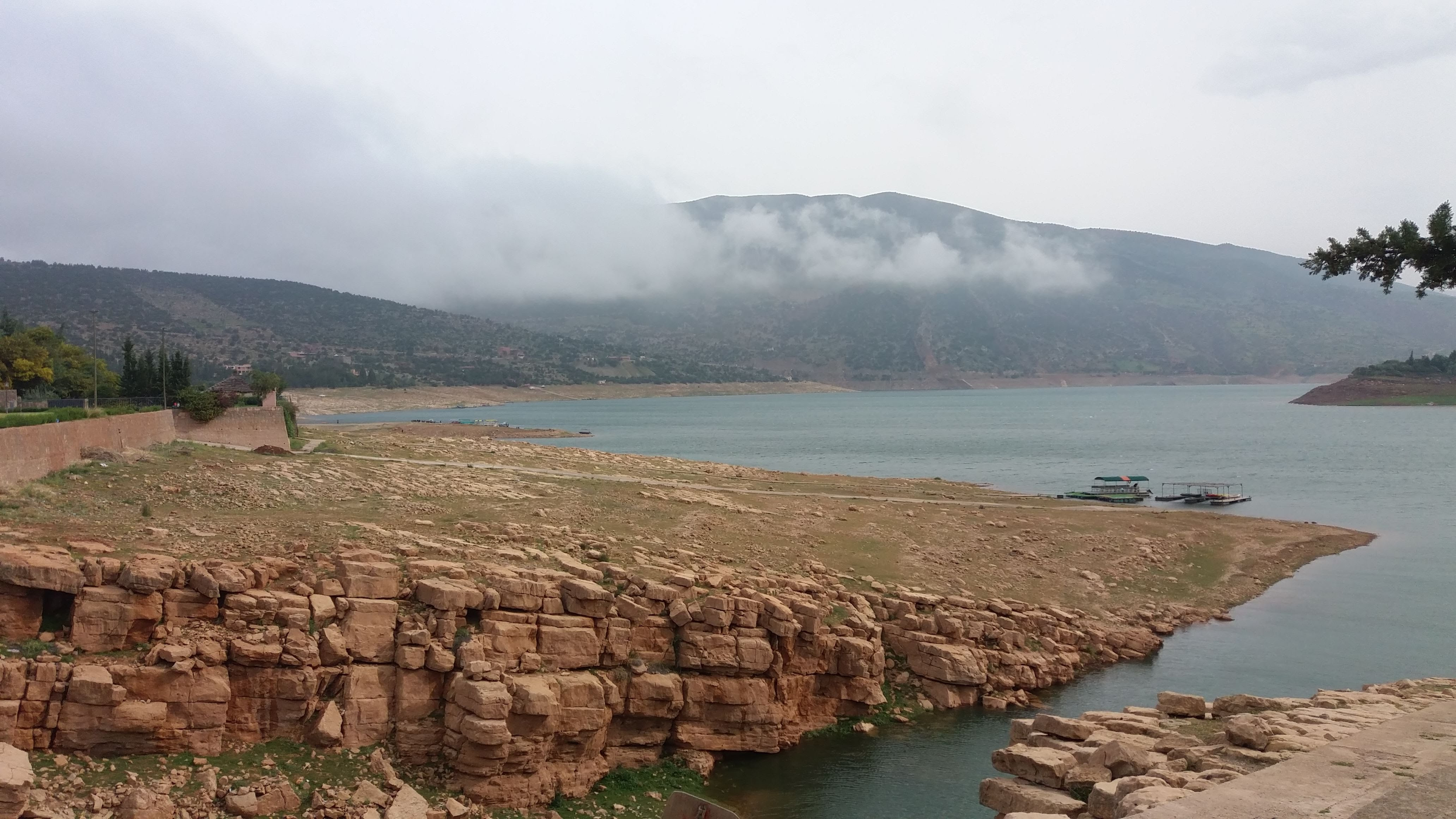

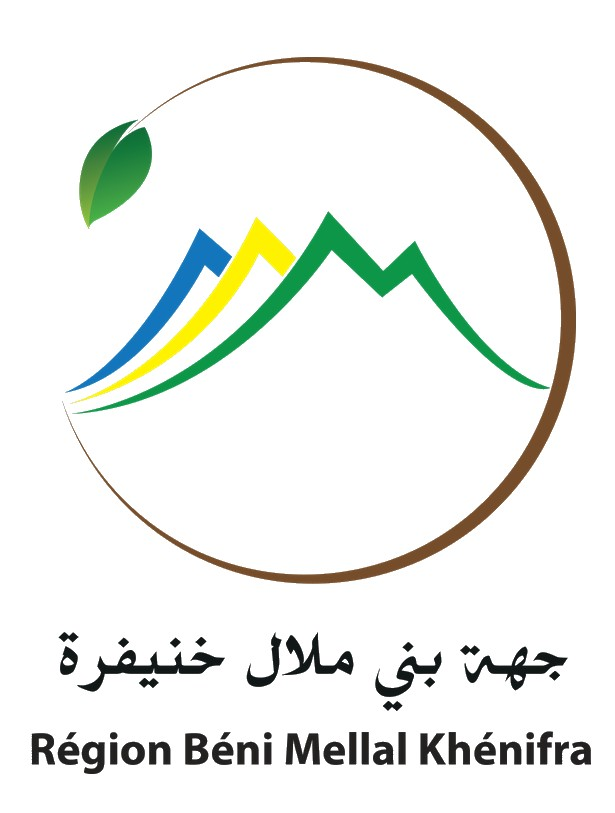
- Seal

- Location in Morocco
- Country: Morocco
- Created: September 2015
- Capital: Beni Mellal

Government
  - Type: Governor–regional council
  - Wali: Mohamed Benribag
  - Council president: Adil Barakat (PAM)

Area
  - Total: 28,374 km^{2} (10,955 sq mi)

Population (2024)
  - Total: 2,525,801
  - Rank: 7th out of 12 Regions
  - Density: 89.018/km^{2} (230.56/sq mi)
- Time zone: UTC+0 (GMT)

Beni Mellal-Khenifra (Note: Standard Moroccan Tamazight: ⴱⵏⵉ ⵎⵍⵍⴰⵍ ⵅⵏⵉⴼⵔⴰ, Arabic: بني ملال - خنيفرة, romanized: banī mallāl - ḵunayfira) is one of the twelve regions of Morocco, covering an area of 28,374 km^{2}, and recorded a population of 2,525,801 in the 2024 Moroccan census. The capital of the region is Beni Mellal.

== Geography ==
Beni Mellal-Khenifra is located in the interior of the country. It borders Rabat-Salé-Kénitra to the north, Fès-Meknès to the northeast, Drâa-Tafilalet to the southeast, Marrakesh-Safi to the southwest, and Casablanca-Settat to the northwest. In the western and central part of the region is the productive Tadla plains irrigated by the Oum Er-Rbia River. This plain is bracketed by the High Atlas mountains which run through the southern and eastern parts of the region, and the foothills of the Middle Atlas to the north.

== History ==
Beni Mellal-Khenifra was formed in September 2015 by adding Khouribga Province of Chaouia-Ouardigha region and Khénifra Province of Meknès-Tafilalet region to the three provinces previously making up the region of Tadla-Azilal.

== Government ==
Following the 2021 regional elections, Adil Barakat, also a member of the Authenticity and Modernity Party, was elected president of the regional council. The current wali of the region is Mohamed Benribag.

=== Subdivisions ===
Provinces of Beni Mellal-Khenifra

Beni Mellal-Khenifra comprises five provinces:

Province	Population (2024)
Béni Mellal Province	580,327
Azilal Province	574,112
Khouribga Province	525,145
Fquih Ben Salah Province	475,977
Khénifra Province	370,240

=== Regional leadership ===
Wali of Béni Mellal-Khénifra since 2015
Name	Duration	Under
Mohamed Derdouri	2015–2018	King Mohammed VI
Abdessalam Bekrate	2018–2019	King Mohammed VI
Khatib El Hebil	2019–2024	King Mohammed VI
Mohamed Benribag	2024–present	King Mohammed VI

Regional Council Presidents of Béni Mellal-Khénifra since 2015
Name	Duration	Party	Under
Brahim Mojahid	2015–2021	PAM	King Mohammed VI
Adil Barakat	2021–present	PAM	King Mohammed VI

== Economy ==
Agriculture comprises the majority of the region's economy. Major crops include cereals, beetroot, olives, citrus fruits, and pomegranates; the production of milk and meat is also substantial. The Ouled Abdoun Basin near Khouribga holds 44% of Morocco's phosphate reserves.

== Infrastructure ==
The A4 expressway connects the region with the rest of the national expressway network, passing through the cities of Beni Mellal, Oued Zem an, d Khouribga as it heads northwest to Berrechid just south of Casablanca. National Route 8 is another important highway, connecting Beni Mellal and Khenifra with Marrakesh in the southwest and Fez in the northeast. Beni Mellal Airport is served by Royal Air Maroc, and there is a rail line with passenger service that runs between Oued Zem, Khouribga, and Casablanca.
