= Hans-Arnold Stahlschmidt =

German World War II fighter pilot

- Born: 15 September 1920; Kreuztal, Kingdom of Prussia, German Empire
- Died: 7 September 1942 (aged 21); El Alamein, British-occupied Egypt
- Military career
- Allegiance: Nazi Germany
- Branch: Luftwaffe
- Service years: 1939–1942
- Rank: Oberleutnant (first lieutenant)
- Unit: JG 27
- Commands: 2./JG 27
- Conflicts: World War II: North African Campaign; Western Desert Campaign †
- Awards: Knight's Cross of the Iron Cross with Oak Leaves

Hans-Arnold Stahlschmidt (15 September 1920 – 7 September 1942) was a German fighter pilot during World War II. A flying ace, he was credited with 59 victories against the Western Allies in North Africa. Stahlschmidt was a close friend of the prominent ace Hans-Joachim Marseille.

== Early life ==
Hans-Arnold Stahlschmidt was born on 15 September 1920 in Kreuztal, Westphalia. Following his compulsory Reich Labour Service, Stahlschmidt joined the military service of the Luftwaffe as a cadet on 16 October 1939.

== World War II ==
World War II in Europe had begun on Friday, 1 September 1939, when German forces invaded Poland. In Salzwedel, Stahlschmidt completed his military basic training. On 15 November 1939, he was posted to the pilot training facilities in Breslau and the Kriegsschule (war-college) at Vienna-Schwechat. From here in January 1941, he was posted as an Oberfähnrich (Officer Candidate) to 2. Staffel (2nd squadron) of Jagdgeschwader 27 (JG 27—Fighter Wing 27) based at Berlin. (Note: For an explanation of Luftwaffe unit designations see Organisation of the Luftwaffe during World War II.) Also posted to I./JG 27 (1st Group) at the same time was Hans-Joachim Marseille. On 1 March 1941, Stahlschmidt was promoted to Leutnant (second lieutenant) with a rank age date of 1 February 1941.

In March 1941, I./JG 27 was deployed to Sicily for operations over Malta. In early April the group was moved to Graz in Austria for the German invasion of Yugoslavia. On 14 April 1941 with campaign over, I./JG 27 was recalled to Munich being transferred to North Africa.

=== North Africa ===
They were initially based at Ain-el-Gazala, just west of Tobruk. Stahlschmidt sank two small ships. In one attack on a 200-ton sailing ship his cannon fire struck the Galley, hitting the petrol-powered cooker, causing a large fire. Eight English and six Greek sailors abandoned the ship before it sank. Another was sunk leading to the capture of 32 men. Stahlschmidt achieved his first victory during the Siege of Tobruk on 15 June 1941. The British Eighth Army began Operation Battleaxe that morning and 2./JG 27 was engaged in operations throughout the day. Stahlschmidt claimed a Hawker Hurricane, probably of No. 73 Squadron RAF. Stahlschmidt did not file another claim until 20 November 1941. The British Army initiated Operation Crusader to relieve Tobruk. Stahlschmidt claimed a trio of South African Air Force (SAAF) Martin Maryland bombers, west of Tobruk. The 21 Squadron SAAF reported the loss of four from a formation of nine and claimed one Bf 109 shot down in exchange during a mission to bomb positions at Al Edem. A week later, on 27 November, he claimed another Hurricane south of El Adem for his fifth victory which qualified him as a flying ace.

On 6 December he was appointed Gruppen-Adjutant of I./JG 27, succeeding Oberleutnant Ludwig Franzisket, a position he held briefly until his return to 2./JG 27 in February 1942. On 14 December 1941 Stahlschmidt claimed his sixth victory in another day of heavy air fighting. South of Trimi he claimed a Curtiss P-40 Warhawk. Stahlschmidt's first victory of 1942 was claimed on 11 January south of Agedabia. P-40s from No. 3 Squadron RAAF (Royal Australian Air Force) were bounced by Stahlschmidt's staffel and he shot down Sergeant Cameron. On 22 January 1942 3 Squadron were again bounced by Stahlschmidt and his wingman. Stahlschmidt shot down Flying Officer James McIntosh, who was killed. On 21 February 1942, Stahlschmidt was shot down in his Bf 109 F-4 trop (Werknummer—factory number 8528). On this mission he was a part of a formation led by his Staffelkapitän (Squadron leader), Oberleutnant Gerhard Homuth. They observed 11 P-40s near Acroma. In a letter to his mother he described the subsequent events:

I saw the Curtiss planes approximately 300 meters below us and falling away below. These aircraft were no threat to us whatsoever! Now I just wanted to level out of my turning bank, since my colleagues were already at a substantially higher altitude. Keppler (his wingman), overshot me. Once again, I saw the Curtiss planes 300 meters directly below me and counted eleven aircraft.

Not suspecting anything untoward, I continued my level climb. All of a sudden there was a loud noise in my cockpit — I'd taken cannon [sic] fire. The crate immediately flipped uncontrollably onto its back. Fuel gushed into the cockpit; it began smoking and then I completely lost control of the Bf 109, spiraling down on my back through the Curtisses. Over the intercom I heard the angry voice of Homuth: "Which of you idiots just let himself get shot down?"

Trailing a long column from my radiator I fell earthward. The water temperature climbed to 140 degrees. At an altitude of 1,000 meters I again regained control of the crate. With a bit of flair and fortune I managed to fly the 100 km to our own lines, during which I would only switch the engine [on] for short periods, in order to gain altitude for the long glide home.

Crash landing in no man's land, Stahlschmidt escaped the burning wreck with just a pair of singed eyebrows. Once again, as he ran on foot toward German lines, Stahlschmidt was fired on by an Allied truck convoy which he had just overflown. However he was picked up by a German reconnaissance unit. Back at Staffel HQ Stahlschmidt learned from Marseille and Homuth that the lead Kittyhawk had pulled up sharply and fired accurately. Both were of the opinion that it was a wonderful shot. The Allied pilot was the leading Australian ace, Squadron Leader Clive Caldwell, CO of No. 112 Squadron RAF.

Six days later, on 26 February 1942, flying his Bf 109F-4 Stahlschmidt was again shot down. While strafing an Allied supply column when his engine suddenly seized. This time though, as he crash-landed he was taken prisoner by Free Polish soldiers, who beat him and stole his medals. Interrogated, then sent onto another camp he was able to escape on foot later that night. In a 16-hour trek, he walked 60 kilometres (37 mi) through the desert and reached the German lines. Stahlschmidt purportedly suffered severe anxiety after his escape. His physical injuries amounted to a fractured eye socket and several cracked ribs. His psychological state manifested itself in constant shaking and insomnia. In modern parlance, these symptoms could be construed as post-traumatic stress disorder. Stahlschmidt was sent to a hospital in Munich for two weeks and a medical evaluation. Marseille was suffering from dysentery and was sent with him.

Stahlschmidt was awarded the German Cross in Gold on 9 April 1942. Stahlschmidt crash-landed and being shot down by ground-fire on 7 May in Werknummer 8480. The rocky terrain tore off the tail plane of the Bf 109. On 22 May 1942 he achieved his 9th victory. Over the frontline Bf 109s of his staffel bounced 20 P-40s escorting 12 Martin Baltimore bombers. Stahlschmidt shot down a P-40 from No. 250 Squadron RAF. On 26 May 1942, Generaloberst Erwin Rommel launched Operation Theseus, also referred to as the Battle of Gazala and the Battle of Bir Hakeim. Stahlschmidt gained his 10th victory on 29 May 1942 as the Battle of Gazala and Bir Hakeim raged. His Staffel attacked P-40s of No. 450 Squadron RAAF and claimed three shot down. Stahlschmidt claimed a single victory—Sergeants Dean, Packer and Shaw were posted missing in action. It was now that Stahlschmidt's combat success really started. On 26 June the Geschwader crossed over onto Egyptian soil, at Sidi Barrani.

=== In command ===
Stahlschmidt slowly built a reputation as a combat leader over the summer, 1942. On 13 June he claimed a Hurricane of No. 213 Squadron RAF while comrade Friedrich Körner registered his first victories. The following day near Kambut he claimed a P-40 of 5 Squadron SAAF. The German Africa Corps pursued the British into Egypt and Rommel attempted to destroy the bulk of the British Army at Mersa Matruh. In the ensuing Battle of Mersa Matruh, Rommel depleted British forces but failed to destroy them. On this day of intensive air combat Stahlschmidt downed four Desert Air Force aircraft over the battlefield. The claims were his 14th–17th aerial victories. Stahlschmidt's close friend Marseille passed the 100-mark on 18 June 1942 and departed for two months leave.

On 1 July 1942, Stahlschmidt was himself promoted to Staffelkapitän of 2./JG 27. This same day the First Battle of El Alamein began. On the morning of 4 July 1942 Stahlschmidt claimed four victories in the El Alamein area—three on a morning mission and one in the late afternoon. In the morning battle Stahlschmidt, with Feldwebel Günter Steinhausen flying as his wingman, dived to attack and shot down Major Lemmie Le Mesurier and Lieutenant Powell of 1 Squadron SAAF. Mesurier was wounded in action. JG 27 lost the 36-victory ace Körner who was shot down and captured. The following day he claimed a Gloster Gladiator. The claim could not be confirmed through British records. Only the 1411 Meteorological Flight was equipped with the aircraft. It may have been an Italian Fiat CR.42 as Regia Aeronautica units were active on this date. The claim was his 27th victory. Further research has indicated that Egyptian officers procured military photographs of British positions and intended to hand them over to the Germans. The conspirators ordered Pilot Officer Ahmed Saudi Hussein to deliver them and he took-off in a Gladiator but was intercepted by Stahlschmidt. A second pilot, Warrant Officer Muhammed Ridwan Salim succeeded the following day. He was taken to Germany but captured and handed back the Egyptians in 1945. Salm's fate is unknown.

On 8 July he made another three claims in the space of eight minutes. Two of the claims can be identified from No. 33 Squadron RAF. Pilot Officer Wigle and Sergeant Morris were killed in action. His tally now stood at 26. On a patrol near El Alamein on 10 July, Stahlschmidt shot down two P-40s and a Hurricane in ten minutes to inflate his tally to 33. His adversaries in the battle were from 80, 92 and 127 Squadron RAF. Over the next twelve days he added three more claims. On 22 July Stahlschmidt claimed another three—two P-40s in the morning sorties and a Hurricane in the afternoon. Pilot Officer Barrow was one of his victims, killed in action.

The last claims were made for July on day 27. Stahlschmidt claimed three RAF fighters. In the morning sortie his Staffel trailed 33 Squadron as the British unit returned to base. As they did so, the Germans stumbled across 213 Squadron who were behind 33 Squadron. Consequently 213 received no warning of the German presence and radar plotters assumed the mass to be a single formation. Stahlschmidt claimed a Hurricane from 213 Squadron in the battle over El Hammam. In the after noon he claimed a Hurricane and a P-40 in battle with a formation compromising 1 Squadron SAAF, 3 Squadron RAAF and 450 Squadron RAAF. Two Hurricanes shot down on 1 August and another two on 16 August for his 44–47th victories. Stahlschmidt's opponents on 16 August near El Alamein were from 5 Squadron SAAF. Lieutenant Trenchard was his 46th or 47th victory and he became a prisoner of war. Marseille returned to action on 23 August and Stahlschmidt claimed a single victory.

On 1 September 1942 Marseille shot down 17 Allied aircraft. Stahlschmidt also made two claims and another on the 2 September. On 3 September 1942 he claimed five victories—three P-40s, a Hurricane and a Supermarine Spitfire. This qualified him as an "ace in a day" and brought his tally to 56. Relating the strain of the activity, in another letter home to his family, he described the action on the 3 September 1942:

Today I have experienced my hardest combat. But at the same time it has been my most wonderful experience of comradeship in the air. We were eight Messerschmitts in the midst of an incredible whirling mass of enemy fighters. I flew my 109 for my life. I worked with every gram of energy and by the time we finished I was foaming at the mouth and utterly exhausted. Again and again we had enemy aircraft fighters on our tails. I was forced to dive three or four times, but I pulled up again and rushed back into the turmoil. Once I seemed to have no escape; I had flown my 109 to its limits, but a Spitfire still sat behind me. At the last moment Marseille shot it down, 50 metres from my 109. I dived and pulled up. Seconds later I saw a Spitfire behind Marseille. I took aim at the enemy — I have never aimed so carefully — and he dived down burning. At the end of the combat only Marseille and I were left in the dogfight. Each of us had three kills. At home we climbed out of out planes and were thoroughly exhausted. Marseille had bullet holes in his 109 and I had 11 hits in mine. We embraced each other, but were unable to speak. It was an unforgettable event.

The comments made by Stahlschmidt illustrate how Allied combat tactics and aircraft had improved. Stahlschmidt added a further two on 5 September and another on 6 September. On the latter date, JG 27 suffered a blow when the 40-victory ace Günther Steinhausen was shot down and killed in the Alamein area. Steinhausen was likely shot down by James Francis Edwards. His 59th—and last claim—is recorded as a P-40 shot down near El Hammam at 17:25.

=== Death ===
Commander, Eduard Neumann usually sent up at least a rotte (pair) of Bf 109s on an early morning reconnaissance patrol because the Luftwaffe lacked radar and early-warning radar in Africa. On the morning of the 7 September 1942 Stahlschmidt, flying Bf 109 F-4 (Werknummer 8704) "Red 4", led a Schwarm (four-strong formation) that had taken off on a freie Jagd (fighter sweep) south east of El Alamein. They intercepted a tactical reconnaissance Hurricane covered by a strong escort of Hurricane MK IICs from No. 33 Squadron RAF and No. 213 Squadron RAF. However, Stahlschmidt's flight had failed to notice another flight, of Spitfire Mk Vc's of No. 601 Squadron RAF, which had been flying up in the sun. Trapped between both flights, two 109s were shot down, including Stahlschmidt and the 24-victory ace Leutnant von Lieres u Wilkau. von Lieres u Wilkau survived a torrid crash-landing but Stahlschmidt disappeared.

Commander, Eduard Neumann, dispatched the 1st and 2nd Staffeln to search for the missing ace. Marseille, who was the best of friends with Stahlschmidt, could not fly on the mission and requested that he form part of the search. Neumann refused but promised to update him. Stahlschmidt was nowhere to be found. He was posted as missing in action, and his exact fate remains unknown to this day. Recent research suggests that he may have been shot down by an American ace, Flight Lieutenant John H. Curry (RCAF; 7.5 claims), of 601 Sqn.

In over 400 combat missions in North Africa Stahlschmidt scored 59 victories, all but four being single-engine fighters. All were over Western Allied pilots all were scored in the African theatre. Behind Marseille (151) and Werner Schroer (61), Stahlschmidt was the third highest scoring Desert ace of the war. Sixteen months later on 3 January 1944 he posthumously became the 365th recipient of the Knight's Cross of the Iron Cross with Oak Leaves and was promoted to Oberleutnant (first lieutenant), effective as of 1 September 1942.

In the space of three weeks I. Gruppe, Jagdgeschwader 27 was rocked by the deaths of its three top aces. Stahlschmidt's death only 24 hours after the death of 1./JG 27 ace Günter Steinhausen and was followed on 30 September 1942 by the death of Hans-Joachim Marseille. I./JG 27 claimed 588 aircraft shot down in April 1941–November 1942. Stahlschmidt, Steinhausen and Marseille between them accounted for 250 of these; 42% of the unit's total. Morale fell so low that the Gruppe was withdrawn to Sicily in October. It returned briefly to North Africa, but was withdrawn from the theatre for the final time on 6 December 1942.

== Summary of career ==
=== Aerial victory claims ===
According to Spick, Stahlschmidt was credited with 59 aerial victories. Mathews and Foreman, authors of Luftwaffe Aces — Biographies and Victory Claims, researched the German Federal Archives and found records for 59 aerial victory claims, plus one further unconfirmed claim. All of his confirmed victories were claimed over the Western Allies.

Chronicle of aerial victories
This and the ♠ (Ace of spades) indicates those aerial victories which made Stahlschmidt an "ace-in-a-day", a term which designates a fighter pilot who has shot down five or more airplanes in a single day. This and the – (dash) indicates unconfirmed aerial victory claims for which Stahlschmidt did not receive credit.
| Claim | Date | Time | Type | Location | Claim | Date | Time | Type | Location |
– 2. Staffel of Jagdgeschwader 27 –
| 1 | 15 June 1941 | 11:40 | Hurricane | Sallum | | | | | |
– Stab I. Gruppe of Jagdgeschwader 27 –
| 2 | 20 November 1941 | 12:20 | Martin 167 | southeast Tobruk | 6 | 14 December 1941 | 11:20 | P-40 | south Timimi |
| 3 | 20 November 1941 | 12:25 | Martin 167 | southeast Tobruk | 7 | 11 January 1942 | 12:48 | P-40 | northeast Ajdabiya |
| 4 | 20 November 1941 | 12:30 | Martin 167 | southeast Tobruk | 8 | 22 January 1942 | 12:50 | P-40 | east El-Gtafia |
| 5 | 27 November 1941 | 16:20 | Hurricane | south Al Adm | | | | | |
– 2. Staffel of Jagdgeschwader 27 –
| 9 | 22 May 1942 | 07:50 | P-40 | southwest Tmimi | 35 | 14 July 1942 | 18:29 | Spitfire | El Alamein |
| 10 | 29 May 1942 | 07:49 | P-40 | north Fort Acroma | — | 15 July 1942 | — | Hurricane | 17 km (11 mi) west El Hammam |
| 11 | 13 June 1942 | 06:52 | Hurricane | Tobruk | 36 | 16 July 1942 | 10:15 | Hurricane | southeast El Alamein |
| 12 | 14 June 1942 | 11:08 | P-40 | north-northwest Kambut | 37 | 17 July 1942 | 13:25 | Hurricane | southwest El Alamein |
| 13 | 16 June 1942 | 15:25 | P-40 | southwest Kambut | 38 | 22 July 1942 | 08:25 | P-40 | west El Alamein |
| 14 | 26 June 1942 | 12:20 | Hurricane | southwest Mersa Matruh | 39 | 22 July 1942 | 08:40 | P-40 | southwest El Alamein |
| 15 | 26 June 1942 | 12:27 | Hurricane | 15 km (9.3 mi) southwest Mersa Matruh | 40 | 22 July 1942 | 12:00 | Hurricane | south El Alamein |
| 16 | 26 June 1942 | 12:30 | P-40 | west Mersa Matruh | 41 | 27 July 1942 | 12:26 | Hurricane | south El Hammam |
| 17 | 26 June 1942 | 19:06 | P-40 | south-southwest Mersa Matruh | 42 | 27 July 1942 | 17:30 | Hurricane | southwest El Alamein |
| 18 | 27 June 1942 | 13:05 | P-40 | 10 km (6.2 mi) southeast Fouka | 43 | 27 July 1942 | 17:42 | P-40 | west El Alamein |
| 19 | 2 July 1942 | 06:25 | Beaufighter | north Fuka | 44 | 1 August 1942 | 16:40 | Hurricane | west El Alamein |
| 20 | 2 July 1942 | 18:23 | P-40 | Borg El Arab | 45 | 1 August 1942 | 16:45 | Hurricane | west El Alamein |
| 21 | 3 July 1942 | 15:09 | Hurricane | southeast El Alamein | 46 | 16 August 1942 | 08:15 | P-40 | northwest El Hammam |
| 22 | 3 July 1942 | 15:15 | Hurricane | east El Alamein | 47 | 16 August 1942 | 08:25 | P-40 | west-southwest El Alamein |
| 23 | 4 July 1942 | 06:30 | P-40 | El Alamein | 48 | 23 August 1942 | 08:03 | P-40 | south El Hammam |
| 24 | 4 July 1942 | 06:32 | P-40 | southeast El Alamein | 49 | 1 September 1942 | 17:48 | Hurricane | southeast El Alamein |
| 25 | 4 July 1942 | 08:25 | Hurricane | El Alamein | 50 | 1 September 1942 | 17:50 | Hurricane | southeast El Alamein |
| 26 | 4 July 1942 | 17:05 | Hurricane | southwest Borg El Arab | 51 | 2 September 1942 | 16:12 | P-46 | southwest El Hammam |
| 27 | 7 July 1942 | 06:02 | Gladiator | 10 km (6.2 mi) northeast El Dabaa | 52♠ | 3 September 1942 | 07:22 | P-40 | southwest El Hammam |
| 28 | 8 July 1942 | 10:32 | Hurricane | southeast El Alamein | 53♠ | 3 September 1942 | 07:24 | Spitfire | southwest El Hammam |
| 29 | 8 July 1942 | 10:35 | Hurricane | south Borg El Arab | 54♠ | 3 September 1942 | 07:29 | P-40 | southwest El Hammam |
| 30 | 8 July 1942 | 10:40 | Hurricane | southeast Borg El Arab | 55♠ | 3 September 1942 | 15:12 | Hurricane | southwest El Imayid |
| 31 | 10 July 1942 | 13:25 | Hurricane | north El Alamein | 56♠ | 3 September 1942 | 15:26 | P-40 | south El Imayid |
| 32 | 10 July 1942 | 13:33 | P-40 | west El Alamein | 57 | 5 September 1942 | 10:49 | Spitfire | southwest El Imayid |
| 33 | 10 July 1942 | 13:35 | P-40 | east El Alamein | 58 | 5 September 1942 | 10:52 | P-46 | southeast El Imayid |
| 34 | 11 July 1942 | 16:10 | P-40 | southwest El Alamein | 59 | 6 September 1942 | 17:25 | P-40 | southeast El Hammam |

=== Awards ===
- Iron Cross (1939)
  - 2nd Class (20 June 1941)
  - 1st Class (21 November 1941)
- Front Flying Clasp of the Luftwaffe in Gold
- German Cross in Gold on 9 April 1942 as Leutnant in the I./Jagdgeschwader 27
- Knight's Cross of the Iron Cross with Oak Leaves
  - Knight's Cross on 20 August 1942 as Leutnant and Staffelführer of the 2./Jagdgeschwader 27
  - 365th Oak Leaves on 3 January 1944 (posthumously) as Leutnant and Staffelführer of the 2./Jagdgeschwader 27

== Notes ==
Military offices
| Preceded by Hptm Ernst Maack | Squadron Leader of 2./JG 27; 1 July 1942 – 7 September 1942 | Succeeded by Oblt Josef Jansen |
