= Günter Steinhausen =

German fighter ace and Knight's Cross recipient

Günther Steinhausen
- Born: 15 September 1917; Lobkevitz on the isle of Rügen
- Died: 6 September 1942 (aged 24) near El Alamein
- Cause of death: Killed in action
- Military career
- Allegiance: Nazi Germany
- Branch: Luftwaffe
- Rank: Leutnant (second lieutenant)
- Unit: JG 27
- Conflicts: World War II: North African campaign (MIA)
- Awards: Knight's Cross of the Iron Cross

Günther Steinhausen (15 September 1917 – 6 September 1942) was a German Luftwaffe military aviator during World War II. As a fighter ace, Steinhausen claimed 40 aerial victories over the Western Allies during the North African campaign.

Born in Lobkevitz on the isle of Rügen, Steinhausen was posted to Jagdgeschwader 27 (JG 27—27th Fighter Wing) in the spring of 1941. This unit was ordered to North Africa in April 1941. He claimed his first aerial victory on 17 June. Steinhausen claimed his 40th and last aerial victory on 6 September 1942. Later that day, he was shot down, initially posted as missing in action, assumed killed in action. Posthumously, Steinhausen was awarded the Knight's Cross of the Iron Cross and promoted to Leutnant (second lieutenant).

== Career ==
Steinhausen was born 15 September 1917 at Lobkevitz, present-day part of Breege, on the island of Rügen. After flight training, (Note: Flight training in the Luftwaffe progressed through the levels A1, A2 and B1, B2, referred to as A/B flight training. A training included theoretical and practical training in aerobatics, navigation, long-distance flights and dead-stick landings. The B courses included high-altitude flights, instrument flights, night landings and training to handle the aircraft in difficult situations.) Steinhausen was posted, as an Unteroffizier, to 1. Staffel (1st squadron) of Jagdgeschwader 27 (JG 27—27th Fighter Wing) in the spring of 1941. The squadron was commanded by Hauptmann Karl-Wolfgang Redlich and subordinated to I. Gruppe (1st group) of JG 27 headed by Hauptmann Eduard Neumann.

=== North Africa ===
On 3 December 1940, I. Gruppe was withdrawn from the English Channel and relocated to Döberitz located approximately 10 kilometers (6.2 miles) west of Staaken. There, the pilots were sent on home leave, returning in January 1941. In February, the Gruppe began preparations for Operation Marita, the German invasion of Greece while the ground elements of the Gruppe began their relocation to Tripoli in North Africa, arriving there on 18 March. There, the ground crew began preparations for the air elements to arrive at the designated airfield at Ayn al-Ġazāla. In parallel, the air elements of I. Gruppe relocated to Munich-Riem Airfield in early March. There, the Gruppe received refurbished Messerschmitt Bf 109 E-7 fighter aircraft. The aircraft had been equipped with a sand-filter on the front of the supercharger intake which made the aircraft more suitable for deployment in North Africa. On 4 April, the Gruppe was ordered to move to Graz Airfield for Operation Marita. German forces launched the attack on 6 April. The orders for I. Gruppe that day were to attack and destroy the Yugoslavian air defenses in the area of Laibach, present-day Ljubljana in Slovenia. Following Operation Marita, the air elements briefly returned to Munich-Riem before they transferred to North Africa, arriving in Ayn al-Ġazāla between 18 and 22 April 1941. On 19 April, 1. Staffel flew its first combat mission in North Africa.

Steinhausen claimed his first aerial victory on 9 June, shooting down a Hawker Hurricane north of Tobruk. His opponents probably belonged to the Royal Air Force (RAF) No. 73 Squadron. On 15 June, British forces launched Operation Battleaxe, an offensive to raise the Siege of Tobruk and re-capture eastern Cyrenaica. On 17 June, the offensive ended with reaching its objectives. The next day, the RAF attacked the road from Fort Capuzzo to Al Adm and Tobruk. A flight from 1. Staffel bounced these aircraft and Steinhausen claimed his second aerial victory when he shot down a Brewster F2A Buffalo near Buq Buq. (Note: Initially, the Luftwaffe referred to the Curtiss P-40 Warhawk fighter as "Brewster" before they started referring to them as "Curtiss".) For this, Steinhausen was awarded the Iron Cross 2nd Class (Eisernes Kreuz zweiter Klasse). On 2 August, he claimed two Hurricane fighters shot down northwest of Mersa Matruh. On 26 August 1941, Steinhausen claimed his fifth aerial victory, making him a flying ace. The aircraft claimed, a Curtiss P-40 Warhawk fighter: probably a Tomahawk IIb AK374 of No. 250 Squadron flown by British ace Sergeant Maurice Hards (7 victories) who force-landed wounded near Mersa Matruh.

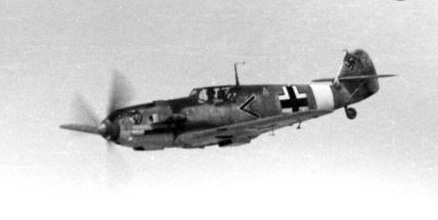
A Bf 109 E of I./JG 27 similar to those flown by Steinhausen

In August, as the remaining Gruppen of Jagdgeschwader 27 transferred in to North Africa from Russia as reinforcements. In late October, I. Gruppe was reequipped with the Bf 109 F-4/trop. To retain operation status, 1. and 3. Staffel left North Africa on 22 October while 2. Staffel stayed. In Italy they handed over their Bf 109 E variants and continued the journey back home by train. The pilots were sent on a short home-leave before returning to Ayn al-Ġazāla on 10 November. On 5 December, 1. Staffel was placed under the command of Oberleutnant Ludwig Franzisket when Redlich was transferred.

After the British Operation Crusader in November and December had relieved Tobruk and driven the Axis back, in January Rommel had sufficient fuel supplies to launch his next counter-attack, and he took Benghazi on 29 January, as the aircrew retraced their steps to airfields they had abandoned only a month or so previously. On 28 March, Steinhausen claimed his 10th aerial victory, a P-40 fighter shot down south of Timimi. His opponent may have been Pilot Officer J.A. Crosbie from No. 94 Squadron who was shot down in his Kittyhawk I AK858. On 11 April, I. Gruppe engaged in aerial combat with P-40 fighters from No. 4 Squadron of the South African Air Force (SAAF) on fighter escort mission for Junkers Ju 87 dive bombers from I. Gruppe of Sturzkampfgeschwader 3 (StG 3—3rd Dive Bomber Wing). During this mission, Steinhausen claimed one of the P-40 fighters shot down north of Bir Habex.

On 22 May, I. Gruppe relocated to an airfield at Timini. That day, Steinhausen claimed a P-46, a variant of the Curtiss P-40 Warhawk, shot down south of Martuba. On 26 May, Generaloberst Erwin Rommel launched Operation Theseus, also referred to as the Battle of Gazala and the Battle of Bir Hakeim. Two days later, I. Gruppe predominantly flew fighter escort missions for Ju 87 dive bombers to the combat area near Al Adm. On an early morning mission east of Gambut, Steinhausen claimed a Hurricane fighter shot down. On 31 May, Steinhausen claimed two P-40 shot on an early morning mission north of Bir Hakeim. His opponents may have been from the SAAF No. 4 Squadron. On 16 June, I. Gruppe flew combat air patrols in area of Gambut and Al Adm, the Gruppe flew eight missions during the course of which Steinhausen claimed four aerial victories, one Hurricane and three P-40 fighters, taking his total to 20 aerial victories claimed. On 27 June, I. Gruppe moved to an airfield named Bir el Astas, located approximately 35 kilometers (22 miles) west of Mersa Matruh. That day, Steinhausen claimed four aerial victories, a Martin Maryland bomber near El Dabaa and three Hurricane fighters southwest of Fukah. The next day, he again claimed four aerial victories, four Hurricanes south of Fukah, taking his total to 30 aerial victories claimed.

=== Battle of El Alamein and death ===
On 1 July, Axis forces launched an attack on Allied (British Empire and Commonwealth) positions at El Alamein and Deir-el-Shein in what would become the First Battle of El Alamein (1–27 July 1942). In support of this offensive, I. Gruppe moved to an airfield named Mumin Busak, located near El Dabaa, at on the evening of 2 July. The next day, I. Gruppe flew multiple combat missions. On one of these missions, Steinhausen claimed a P-40 fighter shot down east-southeast of El Alamein. On 4 July, he claimed a Hurricane fighter south-southeast of El Alamein and a P-46 fighter near Borg El Arab on 5 July. On 9 July, Steinhausen shot down a United States Army Air Forces (USAAF) Consolidated B-24 Liberator, ("Eager Beaver"), and only the second four-engine bomber claimed by JG 27. One of six bombers of the Halverson Detachment ("HALPRO") that had been sent to attack an Axis supply convoy, it was his 34th aerial victory. On 20 July, I. Gruppe moved to a makeshift airfield named Quotaifiya, located approximately 50 kilometers (31 miles) east of Fukah.

JG 27 insignia

On 26/27 July, the Allied Eighth Army launched Operation Manhood in the northern sector in a final attempt to break the Axis forces which failed to reach its objective, effectively ending the first Battle of El Alamein. The front had stabilized at the Alamein line and both sides paused to build up supplies for their next offensives. In recognition for his aerial victories claimed, Steinhausen was awarded the Honour Goblet of the Luftwaffe (Ehrenpokal der Luftwaffe) on 10 August, and the German Cross in Gold (Deutsches Kreuz in Gold) on 21 August. On 22 August, Steinhausen claimed a Supermarine Spitfire fighter shot down south of El Hammam and a Hurricane south of El Alamein. On 31 August, activity picked up again in the Battle of Alam el Halfa south of El Alamein, and Rommel launched his assault on the fortified Alamein line at the beginning of September. On 1 September, I. Gruppe flew four combat missions and claimed 22 aerial victories, including 17 by Hans-Joachim Marseille alone. That day, Steinhausen claimed one Hurricane fighter destroyed near Alam el Halfa. On 3 September, the Allied Eighth Army launched Operation Beresford, the counterattack in the area of Alam el Halfa. In defense of this attack, Steinhausen claimed two Hurricane fighters shot down.

On 6 September, on an early-morning patrol, Steinhausen shot down a Hurricane of SAAF No. 7 Squadron or the RAF No. 274 Squadron near El Alamein for his 40th and last aerial victory. However, he was then himself shot down in his Bf 109 F-4 "White 5" (Werknummer 13272—factory number) southeast of El Alamein. His body was never recovered. One analyst asserts that James Francis Edwards was his victor since his combat report tallies with the action, though he only claimed a "damaged" Bf 109. Another objects, since the time differences do not match. Christopher Shores and his co-authors noted Steinhausen was killed in the morning at 08:00 local time. Francis made a claim between 17:30 and 18:50 in an evening sortie. They assert the more certain candidates are Sergeant W J Malone and Flight Lieutenant R L Mannix from No. 127 Squadron RAF. Both made claim at approximately 08:25 to 09:35. posthumously, Steinhausen was awarded the Knight's Cross of the Iron Cross (Ritterkreuz des Eisernen Kreuzes) on 3 November 1942, and promoted to Leutnant (second lieutenant).

== Summary of career ==
=== Aerial victory claims ===
According to Ring and Girbig, Steinhausen was credited with 40 aerial victories including one four-engined heavy bomber. Mathews and Foreman, authors of Luftwaffe Aces: Biographies and Victory Claims, researched the German Federal Archives and found records for 32 aerial victory claims, plus eight further unconfirmed claims. All of his aerial victories were claimed over the Western Allies and includes one four-engined heavy bomber.

Chronicle of aerial victories
This and the ? (question mark) indicates information discrepancies listed by Prien, Balke, Stemmer, Rodeike, Bock, Mathews and Foreman.
Claim	Date	Time	Type	Location	Claim	Date	Time	Type	Location
– 1. Staffel of Jagdgeschwader 27 – In North Africa — June 1941 – September 1942
1	9 June 1941	05:05	Hurricane	north of Tobruk	21	16 June 1942	18:10	P-40	east of El Adem
2	18 June 1941	06:05	Brewster	Buq Buq	22	16 June 1942	18:14	P-40	southwest of El Adem
3	2 August 1941	18:50	Hurricane	40 km (25 mi) northwest of Mersa Matruh	23	16 June 1942	18:20	P-40	east of Gambut
4? (Note: According to Mathews and Foreman, this claim is unconfirmed.)	2 August 1941	18:50	Hurricane	40 km (25 mi) northwest of Mersa Matruh	24?	27 June 1942	08:58	Martin 167	west-southwest of El Dabaa
5?	26 August 1941	—	P-40	north of Sidi Barrani	25	27 June 1942	18:27	Hurricane	southwest of Fouka
6	14 September 1941	18:15	P-40	southeast of Gasr el Ahrid	26	27 June 1942	18:30	Hurricane	southwest of Fouka
7	7 January 1942	13:02	P-40	northeast of Ajdabiya	27	28 June 1942	11:25	Hurricane	southwest of Fouka
8?	9 January 1942	15:05	P-40	east of Ajdabiya	28	28 June 1942	11:30	Hurricane	south of Fouka
9	9 January 1942	15:30	P-40	east of Ajdabiya	29	28 June 1942	11:31	Hurricane	southwest of Fouka
10	28 March 1942	13:40	P-40	south of Timimi	30	28 June 1942	11:33	Hurricane	southwest of Fouka
11	11 April 1942	10:50	P-40	north of Bir Habex	31	3 July 1942	09:15	P-40	east-southeast of El Alamein
12	25 April 1942	10:10	P-40	east-southeast of Ain el Gazala	32	4 July 1942	17:05	Hurricane	20 km (12 mi) south-southeast of El Alamein
13	22 May 1942	07:50	P-46	20 km (12 mi) south of Martuba	33?	5 July 1942	18:00	P-46	2–3 km (1.2–1.9 mi) south of Borg El Arab
14	28 May 1942	10:00	Hurricane	5 km (3.1 mi) north of Gasr el Ahrid	34	9 July 1942	18:00	B-24	100 km (62 mi) northwest of Bir el Astas
15	31 May 1942	07:25	P-40	north of Bir Hakeim	35?	22 August 1942	14:07	Spitfire	7 km (4.3 mi) south of El Hammam
16	31 May 1942	07:35	P-40	north of Bir Hakeim	36?	25 August 1942	12:14	Hurricane	south of El Alamein
17	9 June 1942	07:53	P-40	south of Mteifel Chebir	37	1 September 1942	17:46	Hurricane	Alam el Halfa
18	12 June 1942	19:03	Hurricane	west of El Adem	38?	3 September 1942	15:43	Hurricane	north of Manga el Rahla
19	12 June 1942	19:14	P-40	south-southwest of El Adem	39	3 September 1942	15:46	Hurricane	north of Manga el Rahla
20	16 June 1942	18:00	Hurricane	east of El Adem	40	6 September 1942	07:57	P-40	southwest of El Alamein

=== Awards ===
- Iron Cross (1939) 2nd and 1st Class
- Honor Goblet of the Luftwaffe (Ehrenpokal der Luftwaffe) on 10 August 1942 as Feldwebel and pilot (Note: According to Obermaier on 5 August 1942.)
- German Cross in Gold on 21 August 1942 as Feldwebel in the I./Jagdgeschwader 27
- Knight's Cross of the Iron Cross on 3 November 1942 as Feldwebel and pilot in the 1./Jagdgeschwader 27
