= Moha Ou Hammou Zayani (commune) =

- commune
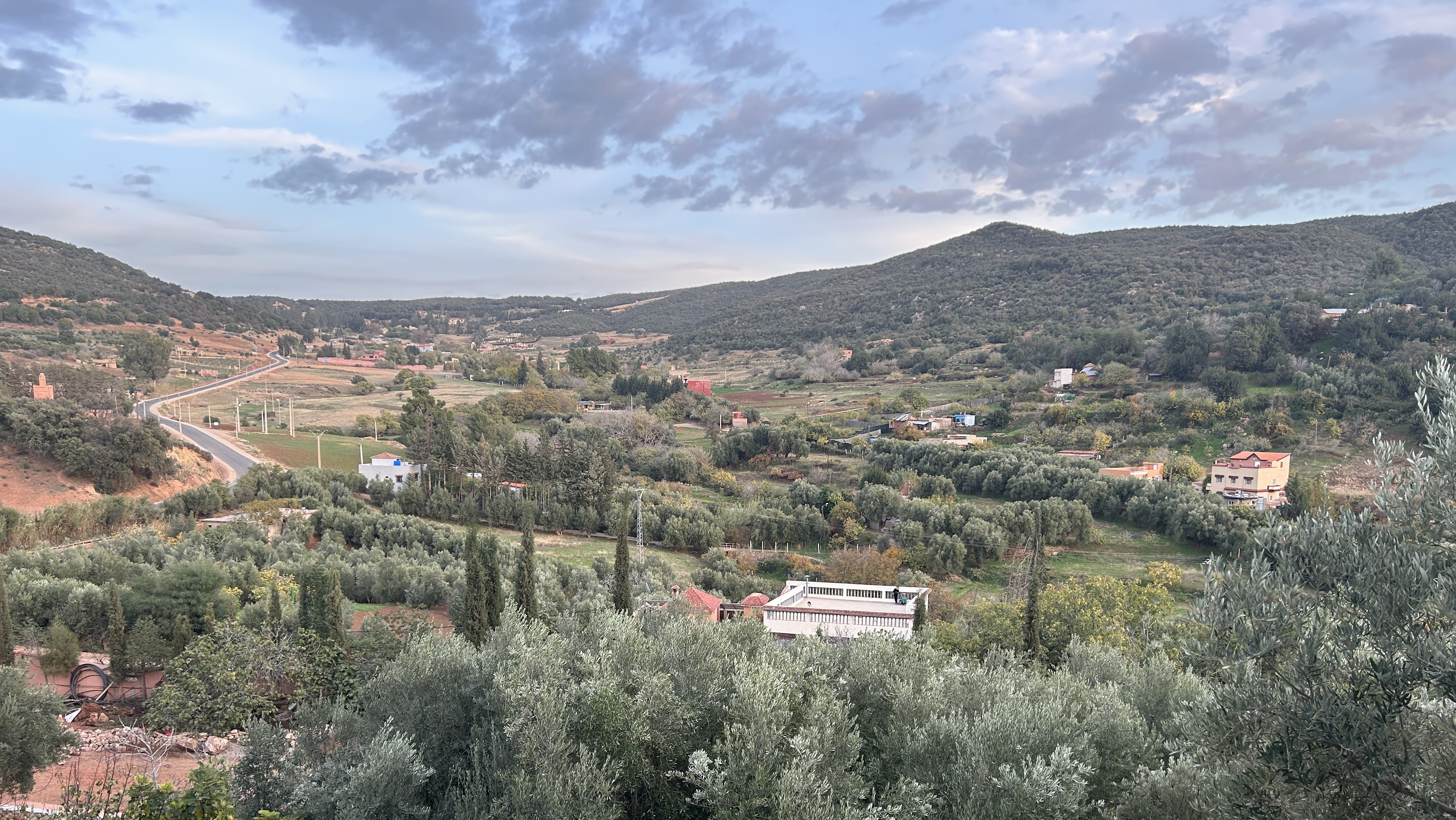
- Interactive map of Moha Ou Hammou Zayani
- Coordinates: 32.9576°N 5.6860°W
- Country: Morocco
- Region: Béni Mellal-Khénifra
- Province: Khenifra

Population (2004)
  - Total: 39,661
- Time zone: UTC+0 (GMT)

View over the eastern side of Moha Ou Hammou Zayani Commune

Moha Ou Hammou Zayani is a rural commune in Khénifra Province, Béni Mellal-Khénifra, Morocco. At the time of the 2004 census, the commune had a total population of 39,661 people living in 8671 households.
