= Zouhair Talbi =

American long-distance runner

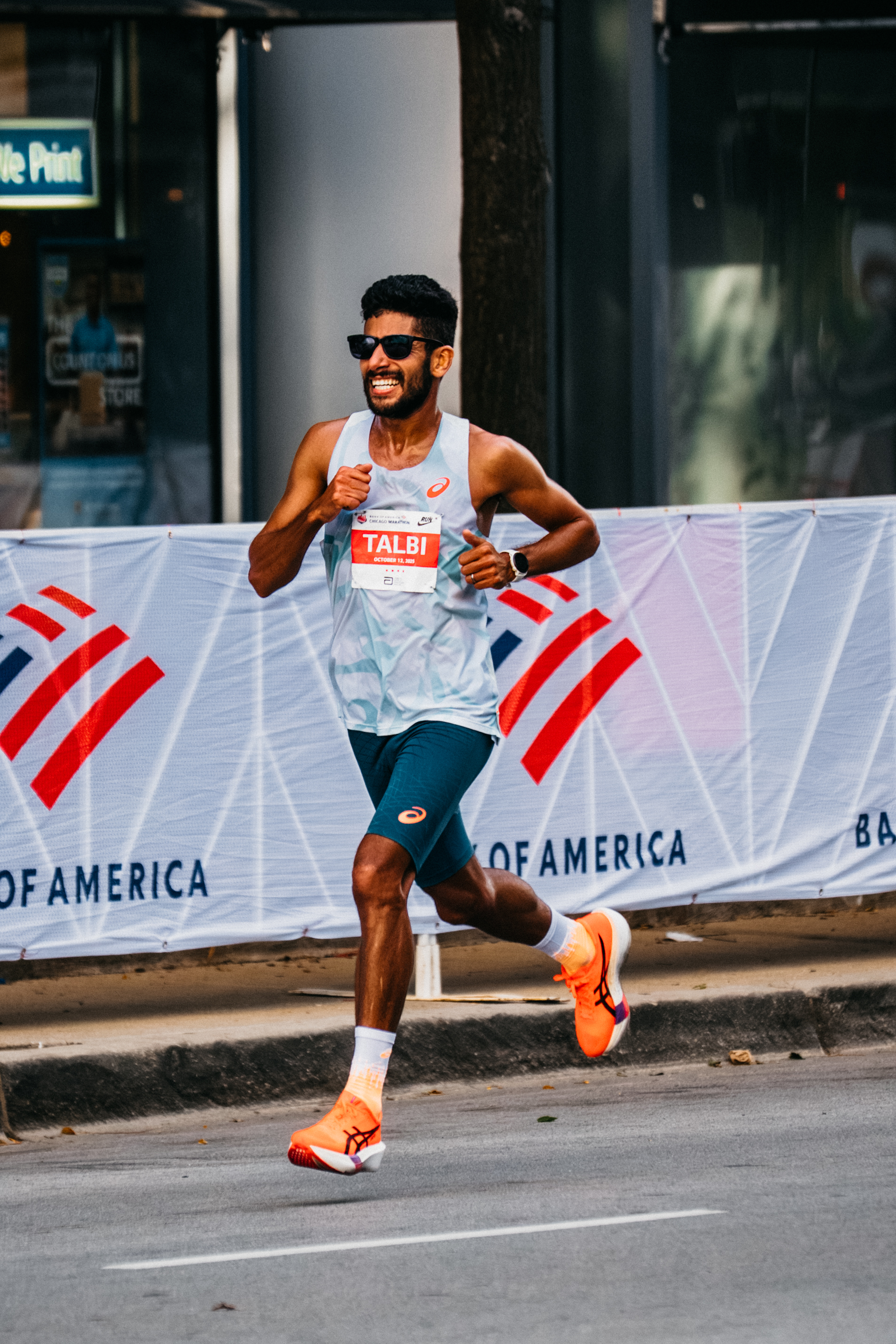
- Zouhair Talbi at mile 25 of the 2025 Chicago Marathon

Personal information
- Born: 8 April 1995 (age 31) Tighassaline, Khenifra, Morocco
- Height: 5 ft 8 in (173 cm)
- Weight: 145 lb (66 kg)

Sport
- Country: Morocco
- Sport: Athletics
- Events: 5000 metres; 10000 metres; Half marathon
- College team: Oklahoma City Stars
- Turned pro: 2022

Achievements and titles
- Olympic finals: 2024; Marathon, 35th
- World finals: 2022; 10,000m, 20th
- Personal bests: Outdoor; 1500 m: 3:45.55 (Fez 2015); 3000 m: 7:40.39i (Fayetteville, Arkansas 2022); 5000 m: 13:28.97 (Leavenworth 2021); 10000 m: 27:20.61 (Irvine 2021); Half marathon: 59:47 (Great North Run 2026); Marathon: 2:03:45 (Boston 2026)

Zouhair Talbi (born 8 April 1995) is a Moroccan-born American long-distance runner. He competed in the marathon at the 2024 Paris Olympics and placed fifth in the 2023 Boston Marathon and 2026 Boston Marathon.

== Early life and career ==
Originally from Tighassaline, Khenifra, Morocco, he was a keen soccer player before transitioning to distance running as a teenager. After excelling, at the age of 18 years-old he competed in the U20 race at the 2013 World Cross Country Championships in Bydgoszcz, Poland, and placed 14th overall. In 2018, he competed in the Bislett Games Oslo Diamond League event in Oslo, running 28:31 to place 4th in the 10,000m.

== College career ==
Talbi decided to move to the United States and studied at the Northwest Kansas Technical College, and then moved to Oklahoma City University. He was a 2015 World University Games silver medalist in 5000 meters. He set a 28:02 personal best in Portland, Oregon in 2019.

On May 14, 2021, he met the Olympic qualifying standard as he won the 10,000m at the Sound Running Track Meet in California and in doing so improved his personal best from 28:02 to 27:20:61. It was the second-fastest performance ever by a collegiate athlete and ranked No. 7 in the world for the year so far. Displaying a fast finish Talbi was in third with two laps remaining before covering the final 400 meters in 59.41 seconds to beat Emmanuel Bor and Joe Klecker. However, Talbi had to be pulled from the Olympics shortly before the commencement as he had not met the drug testing requirements for an athlete from Morocco.

Talbi finished college as a 7-time National Association of Intercollegiate Athletics national champion and 2-time National Junior College Athletic Association All-American.

Representing Oklahoma City University
| Year | Competition | Venue | Position | Event | Note |
|---|---|---|---|---|---|
| 2022 | National Association of Intercollegiate Athletics Indoor Track and Field Championships | South Dakota State University | 1st | Mile | 4:07.27 |
| 2022 | National Association of Intercollegiate Athletics Indoor Track and Field Championships | South Dakota State University | 1st | 3000m | 8:17.67 |
| 2022 | National Association of Intercollegiate Athletics Indoor Track and Field Championships | South Dakota State University | 1st | 5000m | 14:28.39 |
| 2021 | NAIA men's cross country championship | Fort Vancouver National Historic Site, Washington | 1st | 8 km | 24:43.1 |
| 2021 | NAIA men's cross country championship | Seminole Cross Country Course; Cedar Rapids, Iowa | 1st | 8 km | 23:45.2 |
| 2021 | National Association of Intercollegiate Athletics Indoor Track and Field Championships | Mount Marty University, South Dakota | 1st | 5000m | 13:44.13 |
| 2021 | National Association of Intercollegiate Athletics Indoor Track and Field Championships | Mount Marty University, South Dakota | 1st | Distance medley relay | 9:56.08 |

Representing Fort Hays Tech Northwest
| Year | Competition | Venue | Position | Event | Note |
|---|---|---|---|---|---|
| 2020 | National Junior College Athletic Association Indoor Track and Field Championships | Liberty University, Virginia | 2nd | 5000m | 14:12.59 |
| 2019 | NJCAA Men's Division I Cross Country Championship | Albuquerque, New Mexico | 2nd | 8 km | 23:57.6 |

== Professional career ==
In 2023, he set a new half marathon personal best of 1:01:08 to finish fifth at the 2023 Houston Half Marathon, a time that he later matched in 2025, finishing first at the 2025 Chicago Half Marathon. Later in 2023 Talbi ran 2:08.35 to finish fifth at the Boston Marathon.

On 14 January 2024, he set a new course record time of 2:06.39 to win the Houston Marathon. In August 2024, he placed 35th overall competing for Morocco at the 2024 Olympic Games in Paris in 2:11:51.

Talbi lowered the Houston Marathon course record to 2:05:45 on 11 January 2026, for his first win after becoming an American citizen. In doing so, he became the third American to run a sub-2:06 marathon on a record eligible course after Conner Mantz and Khalid Khannouchi. He ran 59:41 to place second at the New York City Half Marathon in March 2026. At the 2026 Boston Marathon he again placed fifth, and his time of 2:03:45 set a new course record for an American. On 13 September, he won the Great North Run in England to become the first American winner in 45-year history of the event, winning in a time of 59:47. In November, Talbi placed sixth in 2:06:43 at the 2026 New York City Marathon, the only American to ever break 2:07 in New York. Talbi was the top American finisher in all three marathons he started in 2026.

== Personal life ==
Born in Morocco, he obtained American citizenship in 2025 and enlisted as a United States Army Reserve. With his wife Elizabeth, who is also a runner, he has a son. Due to his previous representation of Morocco, his eligibility to represent the USA in international championships opens in August 2027.

== Notable marathon results ==
Results taken from IAAF profile

| Year | Race | Place | Time |
|---|---|---|---|
| 2023 | Boston Marathon | 5th | 2:08:35 |
| 2023 | New York Marathon | DNF | |
| 2024 | Houston Marathon | 1st | 2:06:39 |
| 2024 | Boston Marathon | 10th | 2:10:45 |
| 2024 | Paris Olympics | 35th | 2:11:51 |
| 2024 | Yellow River Estuary Dongying Marathon | 3rd | 2:07:17 |
| 2025 | Chicago Marathon | 11th | 2:07:27 |
| 2026 | Houston Marathon | 1st | 2:05.45 |
| 2026 | Boston Marathon | 5th | 2:03.45 |
