= Sidi Lamine =

Coordinates: 32°54′N 6°03′W

Sidi Lamine سيدي لامين
- commune
- Interactive map of Sidi Lamine
- Country: Morocco
- Region: Béni Mellal-Khénifra
- Province: Khénifra

Population (2004)
  - Total: 16,340
- Time zone: UTC+0 (GMT)

Sidi Lamine (Moroccan Arabic: سيدي لامين ) is a commune on the western side of Khénifra Province in the Béni Mellal-Khénifra administrative region of Morocco. At the time of the 2004 census, the commune had a total population of 16,340 people living in 3134 households. Sidi Lamine is located along National Road 710 between the town of Khenifra and the town of Boujad (Bejaâd) in Khouribga Province.

The commune contains two semi-urban centers, Kehf Nsour (Kef El Nsour) and Sidi Bouabad.
