= Hadda Ouakki =

Moroccan singer

Hadda Ouakki ⵃⴰⴷⴷⴰ ⵓⵄⴽⴽⵉ حادة أوعكي
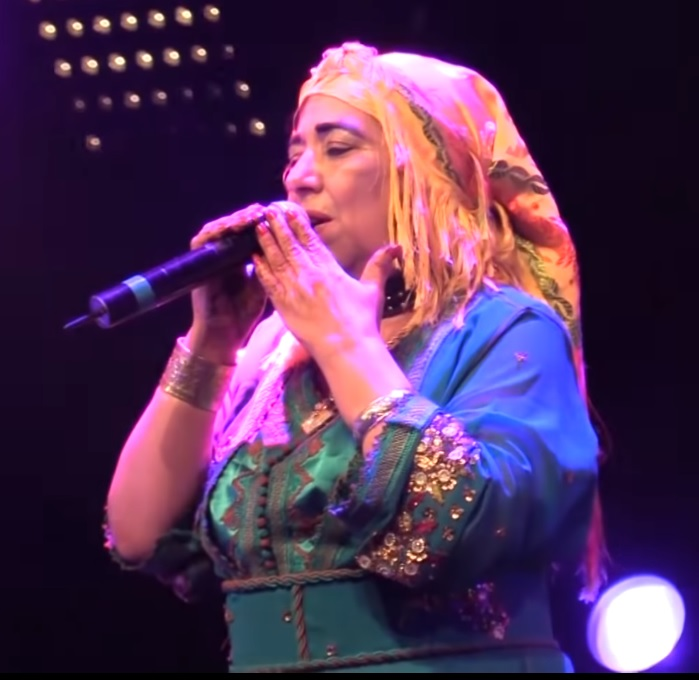
- Hadda Ouakki in Fes in 2019.

Background information
- Born: Hadda Ouakki Naciri; 1953 (age 72–73); Ait Ishaq, Khénifra Province, Morocco
- Genres: Tamawayt
- Occupations: Singer, musician

Hadda Ouakki Naciri (Berber: ⵃⴰⴷⴷⴰ ⵓⵄⴽⴽⵉ - Arabic: حادة أوعكي; born December 1953 in Ait Ishaq, Khénifra Province) is a Moroccan singer in the genre of Tamawayt. Ouakki sings in Central Atlas Tamazight, and is described as one of the divas of the Amazigh music.

== Biography ==
Hadda Ouakki was born in December 1953 in a conservative marabout family in the middle Atlas village of Ait Ishaq. As a young child, she defied her parents by listening to villagers playing folk music, and by getting her face tattooed with blue markings. At the age of 14, her parents married her to a 70-year old man. The marriage failed, and at the age of 16, she escaped to Casablanca with the singer Bennacer Oukhouya. There she learned Arabic, and started to sing professionally in Oukhouya's band.

Gradually, Ouakki's notability became to grow, and she founded her own group in 1981 with the singer Abdellah Zahraoui. Both performed several songs that became famous in Morocco in general, and the Middle Atlas region in particular. She went on to work with Zahraoui for 35 years.

Despite her rise to fame, Hadda Ouakki later lived in poverty. This resulted from her not receiving any royalties because Oukhouya, Zahraoui and other former collaborators had registered all songs solely under their own name. As of 2022, Ouakki still stated she hoped to wage a legal battle and get a share in her own songs' copyrights.
