= Ait Ishaq =

Coordinates: 32°45′36″N 5°43′24″W

Aït Ishaq Arabic: آيت إسحاق Standard Moroccan Tamazight: ⴰⵢⵜ ⵉⵙⵃⴰⵇ
- Commune
- Interactive map of Aït Ishaq
- Country: Morocco
- Region: Béni Mellal-Khénifra
- Province: Khénifra

Population (2024)
  - Commune: 17,847
  - Urban: 11,832
- Time zone: UTC+0 (GMT)

Aït Ishaq (Arabic: آيت إسحاق, Standard Moroccan Tamazight: ⴰⵢⵜ ⵉⵙⵃⴰⵇ) is a town and commune in Khénifra Province, Béni Mellal-Khénifra region, Morocco.

It is located along the RN8 connecting Khenifra to Zaouiat Cheikh, right next to Tighassaline.

As of the 2024 Moroccan census it had 17,847 inhabitants, with 11,832 in the urban centre.

This city was the capital of the Zawiya Dila'iya, It was founded by Muhammad al-Hajj al-Dulai and began building it on Sunday 16 Rabi’ al-Awwal 1048 AH - July 28, 1638 AD. At that time, it was not called by this name, but was called Zawiya Al-Daliyah, and it continued to bear this name until it was seized and destroyed by Sultan Al-Mawla Al-Rashid in 1079 AH - 1668 AD, where it remained after that as a ruin.

== Notable people ==
- Hadda Ouakki
