= Otto Schulz (pilot) =

German World War II fighter pilot

- Otto Schulz in World War II
- Born: 11 February 1911; Treptow an der Rega, Kingdom of Prussia, German Empire
- Died: 17 June 1942 (aged 31) near Sidi Rezegh, Italian Libya
- Cause of death: Killed in action
- Military career
- Allegiance: Nazi Germany
- Branch: Luftwaffe
- Service years: 1934–1942
- Rank: Oberleutnant (first lieutenant)
- Nickname: Eins-Zwei-Drei Schulz
- Unit: Jagdgeschwader 27
- Conflicts: See battles World War II: Battle of France; Battle of Britain; Balkans Campaign; North African Campaign †
- Awards: Knight's Cross of the Iron Cross

Otto Schulz (11 February 1911 – 17 June 1942) was a German Luftwaffe military aviator and fighter ace in World War II. He is credited with 51 aerial victories claimed in over 450 combat missions whilst flying the Messerschmitt Bf 109. He claimed 48 aerial victories against the Western Allies and three over the Eastern Front.

Born in Treptow an der Rega, Schulz joined the Luftwaffe in 1934 and served as a fighter pilot instructor. In January 1940, he was transferred to Jagdgeschwader 27 (JG 27—27th Fighter Wing) and he claimed his first aerial victory on 31 August 1940 during the Battle of Britain. Following service during the Balkans Campaign and Operation Barbarossa, the German invasion of the Soviet Union, he was transferred to the North African Theater in September 1941. He was awarded the Knight's Cross of the Iron Cross on 22 February 1942 following his 44th aerial victory. On 17 June 1942, he was killed in action near Sidi Rezegh, shot down by James Francis Edwards.

== Early life and career ==
Schulz was born on 11 February 1911 in Treptow an der Rega, present-day Trzebiatów in the West Pomeranian Voivodeship in Poland, at the time in the Province of Pomerania of the German Empire. He joined the military service of the Luftwaffe in 1934, was trained as a pilot, and served as a fighter pilot instructor. (Note: Flight training in the Luftwaffe progressed through the levels A1, A2 and B1, B2, referred to as A/B flight training. A training included theoretical and practical training in aerobatics, navigation, long-distance flights and dead-stick landings. The B courses included high-altitude flights, instrument flights, night landings, and training to handle the aircraft in difficult situations.) On 3 January 1940, Schulz was posted to Jagdgeschwader 27 (JG 27—27th Fighter Wing). There, he was assigned to the newly created 4. Staffel (4th squadron), a squadron of II. Gruppe (2nd group). (Note: For an explanation of Luftwaffe unit designations see Organization of the Luftwaffe during World War II.)

II. Gruppe had been created that very same day at the airfield in Magdeburg-Ost (Fliegerhorst Magdeburg-Ost) and was initially placed under the command of Hauptmann Erich von Selle. Command transferred to Hauptmann Werner Anders on 6 February while 4. Staffel was commanded by Oberleutnant Hermann Hollweg. The Gruppe was equipped with Messerschmitt Bf 109 E-1 and E-3 variant. For the first weeks, the Gruppe conducted various flight exercises before on 10 February they were ordered to move to Döberitz. There, the unit was tasked with providing fighter protection for Berlin. On 19 April, II. Gruppe began its transfer to the west, with 4. Staffel moving to Essen-Mühlheim. For the upcoming Battle of France, II. Gruppe was placed under the control of the Stab (headquarters unit) of Jagdgeschwader 51 (JG 51—51st Fighter Wing) under command of Oberst Theo Osterkamp. The Gruppe was briefly ordered to return to Döberitz on 24 April before returning west again on 3 May.

== World War II ==
World War II in Europe had begun on Friday 1 September 1939 when German forces invaded Poland. During the campaign against France, II. Gruppe, as a subordinated unit to JG 51 was controlled by Jagdfliegerführer 2, Oberst Kurt-Bertram von Döring, and was deployed on the right flank of Luftflotte 2 (Air Fleet 2), supporting the attack of Army Group B against the Netherlands. On 10 May, the day the Wehrmacht launched the attack, 4. Staffel was located in Wesel and flew missions to Rotterdam.

Following the Armistice of 22 June 1940, II. Gruppe was sent to Wunstorf near Hanover for replenishment. On 8 July, the Gruppe began its relocation west again, with 4. Staffel arriving in Leeuwarden on 11 July. Here, the Gruppe was tasked with patrolling the Dutch coast until 5 August when they received orders to relocate to an airfield at Crépon, located northwest of Caen on the English Channel. Schulz claimed his first victory on 31 August 1940 over a Royal Air Force (RAF) Supermarine Spitfire fighter in the vicinity of Dover. On 7 September, 4. Staffel was placed under the command of Staffelkapitän (squadron leader) Oberleutnant Gustav Rödel. On 28 October, Schulz claimed his fourth overall and last aerial victory of 1940. On a fighter escort mission to London, he shot down a Spitfire in the vicinity of Gravesend. On 5 November, II. Gruppe was withdrawn from combat operations on the English Channel, relocating to Detmold on 9 November.

While based at Detmold, the pilots were given a period of rest while the Gruppe received a few factory new Bf 109 E-7 aircraft. On 2 January 1941, II. Gruppe received orders to relocate to Romania. On 10 January, the air elements flew to Wien-Schwechat airfield where they stayed two weeks. On 10 February, the Gruppe relocated to Bucharest-Băneasa airfield. After the Bulgaria joined the Axis powers on 1 March, II. Gruppe was ordered to relocate to an airfield named Sofia-Vrba located approximately halfway between Radomir and Sofia to augment the VIII. Fliegerkorps (8th Air Corps) commanded by Generaloberst Wolfram Freiherr von Richthofen. This relocation was already made in preparation for Operation Marita, the German invasion of Greece and Yugoslavia launched on 6 April. Here, Schulz claimed two aerial victories while flying out of airbases in Bulgaria then Greece. His unit, as with most of the Luftwaffe, was then withdrawn for the imminent invasion of Russia. In preparation for Operation Barbarossa, the German invasion of the Soviet Union, II./JG 27 was moved to a makeshift airfield name Praszniki, located northeast of Suwałki close to the Curzon Line, on 18 June. Despite II./JG 27's very brief 9-day participation in Operation Barbarossa, he scored three victories. Two of these were some of the 25 bombers shot down over Vilnius by II./JG 27 on 25 June, however most of that short time the Gruppe was tasked with fighter-bomber missions. On 1 July, II./JG 27 was withdrawn from combat operations, all serviceable aircraft were transferred to III. Gruppe of JG 27 and the personnel was ordered to return to Suwałki, awaiting further orders.

=== North Africa ===
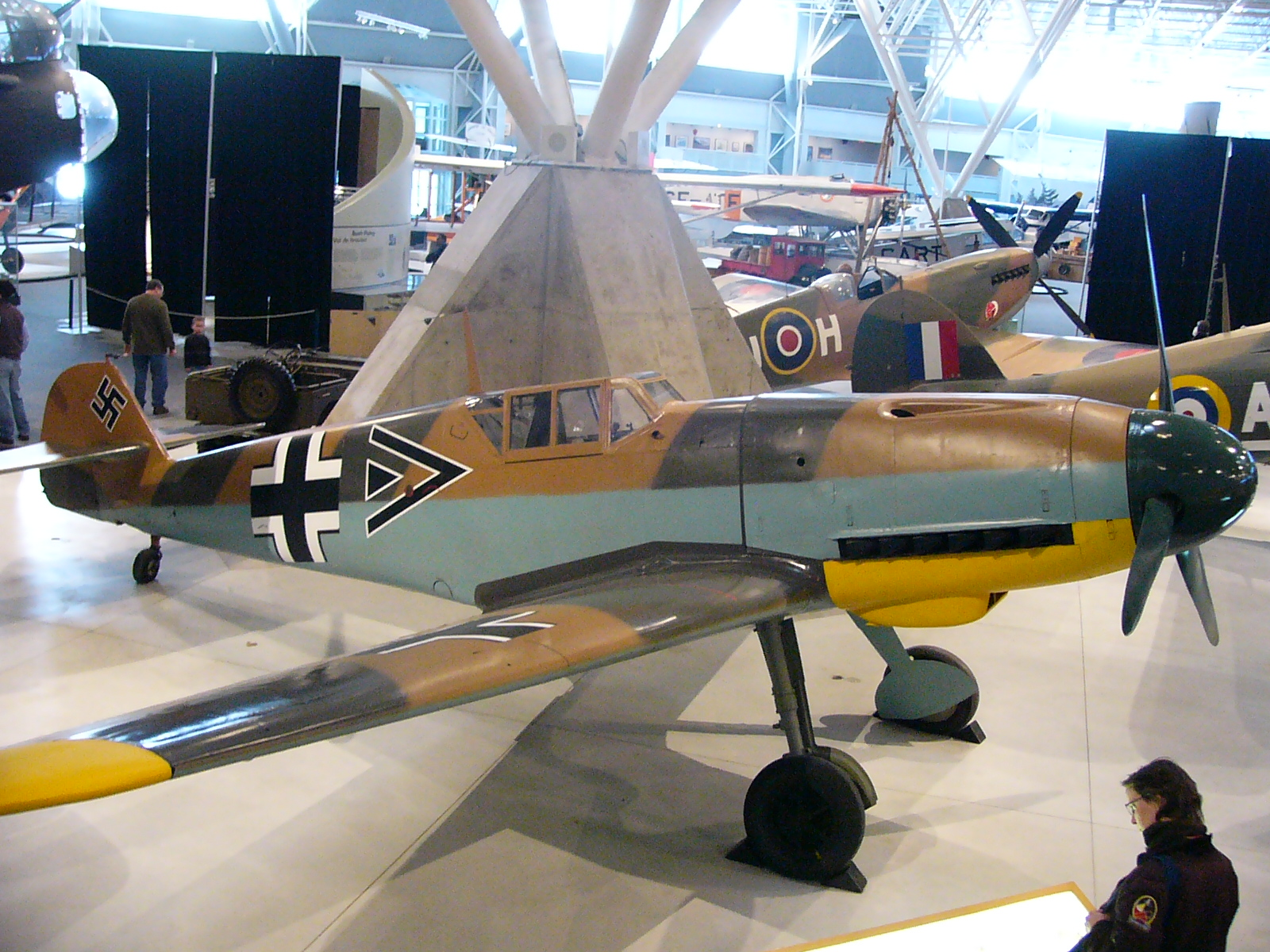
A Bf 109 F-4 in the Canada Aviation Museum, similar to those flown by Schulz

Following the withdrawal from the Eastern Front, II. Gruppe arrived in Döberitz on 24 July 1941. The entire personnel then went on vacation, returning to Döberitz on 18 August. Over the next three weeks, the Gruppe converted to the Bf 109 F-4 fighter. Relocation to the North African Theater began on 7 September, with 4. Staffel transferring south on 16 September and was based at an airfield in Ain el Gazala. There, II. Gruppe joined I. Gruppe of JG 27 which was already based in North Africa. On 26 September, II. Gruppe flew its first combat missions in North Africa, a combat air patrol to Sollum.

On 6 October 1941, 30 October and 28 November, he recorded three victories on each day. On 6 October Lieutenants Miller or Neville McGarr from 2 Squadron SAAF were one other those claims—Rödel downed one of them. On the latter date he downed Lieutenant Palm, Pilot Officer Muhart and Flying Officer Vos. Muhart was hospitalised with burns but the other pilots failed to return.

Schulz's score-sheet is slightly unusual in that many of his victories can be positively identified with specific Allied pilots: On 30 November 1941, his 23rd and 24th victims were aces Sergeant Alan Cameron (6.5 victories) and Pilot Officer Neville Duke (27 victories). Cameron was rescued by Wing Commander Peter Jeffrey and flown to base. Schulz claimed his 30th victory on 15 December, when he shot down and killed Pilot Officer Geoffrey Ranger (5 victories) of No. 250 Squadron. This was followed by downing the Australian ace Nicky Barr on 11 January 1942. On 25 January 1942, Schulz claimed two Curtiss P-40 Warhawk fighters for his 34th and 35th victories. This put him two aerial victories ahead of Rödel and made him the top scorer in II./JG 27 at the time.

On 8 February 1942, Schulz engaged 1 SAAF Hurricanes. He shot down Lieutenants Finney and Biden and then damaged Lieutenant Powell's aircraft in the tail. Each time Schulz descended to strafe and destroy the crash landed fighters from combat altitude of 9,000 feet (2,700 metres). On 15 February 1942, he took off on his own and chased after 20 aircraft of No. 94 and No. 112 Squadron that had just strafed his airfield at Martuba. He shot down five P-40 Kittyhawks in ten minutes, including the top 17-victory RAF ace Ernest "Imshi" Mason, making him an "ace-in-a-day". Schulz was credited with five, the last was Sergeant McQueen's P-40. McQueen was wounded but limped back to base—an Italian 6°Gruppo pilot also claimed a P-40 and may have attacked McQueen. The remaining pilots, Pilot Officer John Robert Vernall Marshall, Sergeant Charles Belcher, and Edward Weightman were killed. Schulz was given credit in part due to the witness report of a German tank commander.

This put him on 44 victories, just behind the 48 of the then top-scorer in the Desert, Hans-Joachim Marseille. In recognition of this success, they were both awarded the Knight's Cross of the Iron Cross (Ritterkreuz des Eisernen Kreuzes) on the same day - 22 February - the first such awards for JG 27 since arriving in North Africa. After this his scoring slowed down to only three victories in March. On 15 March Schulz downed Sergeant Rozanski, No. 112 Squadron. Sent to officer-training school, he was promoted to Leutnant in April. At the end of May, now an Oberleutnant and assigned to the Stab flight of II. Gruppe as Technical Officer, he had another quick flurry of four victories including his 50th on 31 May: a P-40 flown by South African ace Major Andrew Duncan (5.5 victories) of No. 5 Squadron SAAF, who was killed.

=== Death ===
On 17 June 1942, after claiming his 51st and last victory (Canadian ace Flight Lieutenant Walter "Wally" Conrad (6.5 victories) of No. 274 Squadron), Schulz himself was shot down and killed in his Bf 109 F-4trop (Werknummer 10 271—factory number) by RAF Kittyhawks near Sidi Rezegh. Schulz descended to low level to strafe Conrad's P-40 when he was caught by an Allied fighter. Research suggests the victory should be credited to Canadian ace James "Stocky" Edwards of No. 260 Squadron RAF. At the time of his death, behind Marseille and Günther Freiherr von Maltzahn, Schulz was in third place with respect to the number of aerial victories claimed in the North African Theater.

== Summary of career ==
=== Aerial victory claims ===
According to US historian David T. Zabecki, Schulz was credited with 51 aerial victories. Obermaier also lists him with 51 aerial victories claimed in approximately 400 combat missions, including three victories on the Eastern Front and 42 in North Africa. Mathews and Foreman, authors of Luftwaffe Aces — Biographies and Victory Claims, researched the German Federal Archives and found records for more than 50 aerial victory claims, plus one further unconfirmed claim. This number includes three claims on the Eastern Front and 47 on the Western Front.

Chronicle of aerial victories
This and the ♠ (Ace of spades) indicates those aerial victories which made Schulz an "ace-in-a-day", a term which designates a fighter pilot who has shot down five or more airplanes in a single day. This and the ? (question mark) indicates information discrepancies listed by Prien, Stemmer, Rodeike, Bock, Mathews and Foreman.
Claim	Date	Time	Type	Location	Unit	Claim	Date	Time	Type	Location	Unit
– Claims with II. Gruppe of Jagdgeschwader 27 – On the Channel Front — August – November 1940
1	31 August 1940	13:40	Spitfire	Dover	4./JG 27	3	3 September 1940	11:35	Spitfire	Thames Estuary	4./JG 27
2	1 September 1940	15:15	Spitfire	Ashford	4./JG 27	4	28 October 1940	15:30	Spitfire	Gravesend	4./JG 27
– Claims with II. Gruppe of Jagdgeschwader 27 – During the Balkan Campaign — April 1940
5	15 April 1941	06:55	PZL P.24	west Trikkala	4./JG 27	6	20 April 1941	17:10	Hurricane	Megara	4./JG 27
– Claims with II. Gruppe of Jagdgeschwader 27 – On the Eastern Front — 22 June – 19 July 1941
7	22 June 1941	08:20	I-15	north of Alytus	4./JG 27	9	26 June 1941	14:40	SB-3	east of Paratjanowo	4./JG 27
8	26 June 1941	09:25	SB-3	north-northwest of Vilnius	4./JG 27						
– Claims with II. Gruppe of Jagdgeschwader 27 – In North Africa — 22 September 1941 – June 1942
10	6 October 1941	09:10	P-40	southeast of Sidi Omar	4./JG 27	31	20 December 1941	09:40	P-40	west of Maraua	4./JG 27
11	6 October 1941	09:15	Hurricane	southeast of Sidi Omar	4./JG 27	32	20 December 1941	09:43	P-40	west of Maraua	4./JG 27
12	6 October 1941	09:20	Hurricane	southeast of Sidi Omar	4./JG 27	33	11 January 1942	13:10	P-40	Antelat	4./JG 27
13	30 October 1941	09:30	Hurricane	south of Bardia	4./JG 27	34	25 January 1942	16:35	P-40	northeast of Antelat	4./JG 27
14	30 October 1941	09:35	Hurricane	west-southwest of Bardia	4./JG 27	35	25 January 1942	16:40	P-40	25 km (16 mi) northeast Antelat	4./JG 27
15	30 October 1941	09:43	Hurricane	25 km (16 mi) southwest of Sollum	4./JG 27	36	8 February 1942	10:35	P-40	Ain el Gazala airfield	4./JG 27
16	17 November 1941	07:10	Bombay	northeast of Ain el Gazala	4./JG 27	37	8 February 1942	10:40	P-40	east of Ain el Gazala	4./JG 27
17	21 November 1941	09:55	Wellington	southwest of El Adem	4./JG 27	38	13 February 1942	10:22	P-40	northeast of Tobruk	4./JG 27
18	22 November 1941	16:55	P-40	20 km (12 mi) southeast of Bir Hacheim	4./JG 27	39	13 February 1942	10:30	P-40	Tobruk	4./JG 27
19	25 November 1941	16:00	P-40	north of Tobruk	4./JG 27	40♠	15 February 1942	17:45	P-40	southeast of Martuba	4./JG 27
20	28 November 1941	16:00	P-40	north of El Adem	4./JG 27	41♠	15 February 1942	17:46	P-40	southeast of Martuba	4./JG 27
21	28 November 1941	16:10	Hurricane	southwest of El Adem	4./JG 27	42♠	15 February 1942	17:47	P-40	southeast of Martuba	4./JG 27
22	28 November 1941	16:12	Hurricane	El Adem	4./JG 27	43♠	15 February 1942	17:50	P-40	west of Ain el Gazala	4./JG 27
23	30 November 1941	09:10	P-40	northeast of Bir el Gubi	4./JG 27	44♠	15 February 1942	17:55	P-40	35 km (22 mi) southeast of Martuba	4./JG 27
24	30 November 1941	09:20	P-40	southwest of El Adem	4./JG 27	45	13 March 1942	12:35	P-40	southwest of Tobruk	4./JG 27
25	4 December 1941	10:16	P-40	Bir el Gubi	4./JG 27	46? (Note: According to Mathews and Foreman this claim is unconfirmed.)	15 March 1942	11:32	P-40	10 km (6.2 mi) south Fort Acroma	4./JG 27
26	6 December 1941	12:28	Blenheim	southeast of El Adem	4./JG 27	47	28 May 1942	12:20	P-40	15 km (9.3 mi) northwest of El Adem	4./JG 27
27	6 December 1941	12:30	Blenheim	southeast of El Adem	4./JG 27	48	28 May 1942	16:12	P-40	15 km (9.3 mi) east of El Adem	4./JG 27
28	7 December 1941	09:50	Boston	south of Ain el Gazala	4./JG 27	49	31 May 1942	18:57	P-40	20 km (12 mi) southwest of El Adem	4./JG 27
29	8 December 1941	13:10	Boston	north of Ridotto	4./JG 27	50	31 May 1942	19:00	P-40	15 km (9.3 mi) southwest of El Adem	4./JG 27
30	15 December 1941	11:30	P-40	southwest of Geziregh	4./JG 27	51	17 June 1942	10:20	Hurricane	east of Bu Amud	4./JG 27

=== Awards ===
- Iron Cross (1939)
  - 2nd Class (September 1940)
  - 1st Class (19 September 1940)
- Honour Goblet of the Luftwaffe on 5 January 1942 as Oberfeldwebel and pilot (Note: According to Obermaier on 30 December 1941.)
- German Cross in Gold on 14 February 1942 as Oberfeldwebel in the 4./Jagdgeschwader 27
- Knight's Cross of the Iron Cross on 22 February 1942 as Oberfeldwebel in the II./Jagdgeschwader 27
