= Tighza =

Coordinates: 33.1875°N 5.62389°W

- Town
- Interactive map of Tighza
- Country: Morocco
- Region: Béni Mellal-Khénifra
- Province: Khénifra

Population (2004)
  - Total: 2,217
- Time zone: UTC+0 (GMT)

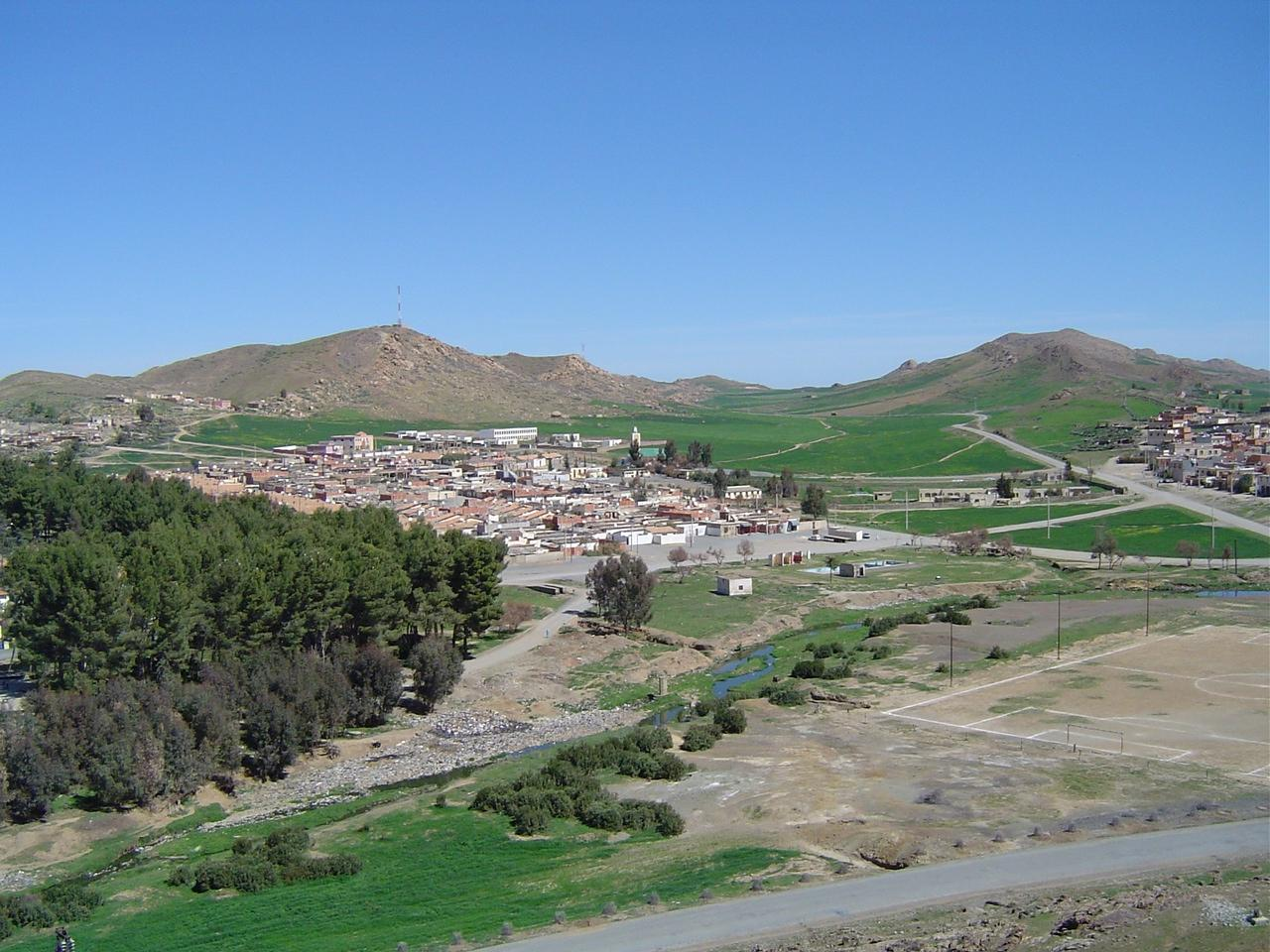
Tighza

Tighza is a town in Khénifra Province, Béni Mellal-Khénifra, Morocco. According to the 2004 census it has a population of 2,217.
