= Amalou Ighriben =

- Town
- Location within Morocco
- Coordinates: 32°56′20″N 5°38′59″W
- Country: Morocco
- Region: Béni Mellal-Khénifra
- Province: Khénifra

Population (2004)
  - Total: 28,933
- Time zone: UTC+0 (GMT)

Amalou Ighriben (Arabic: املو إغربن) is a town and eastern suburb of Khenifra in Khénifra Province, Béni Mellal-Khénifra, Morocco. According to the 2004 census it has a population of 28,933.
