= Oum Rabia =

Oum Rabia (Arabic: أم الربيع lit. 'mother of spring') could refer to:

- Oum Er-Rbia River
- Oum Rabia (commune)
