= Ernest Mason =

British flying ace (1913–1942)

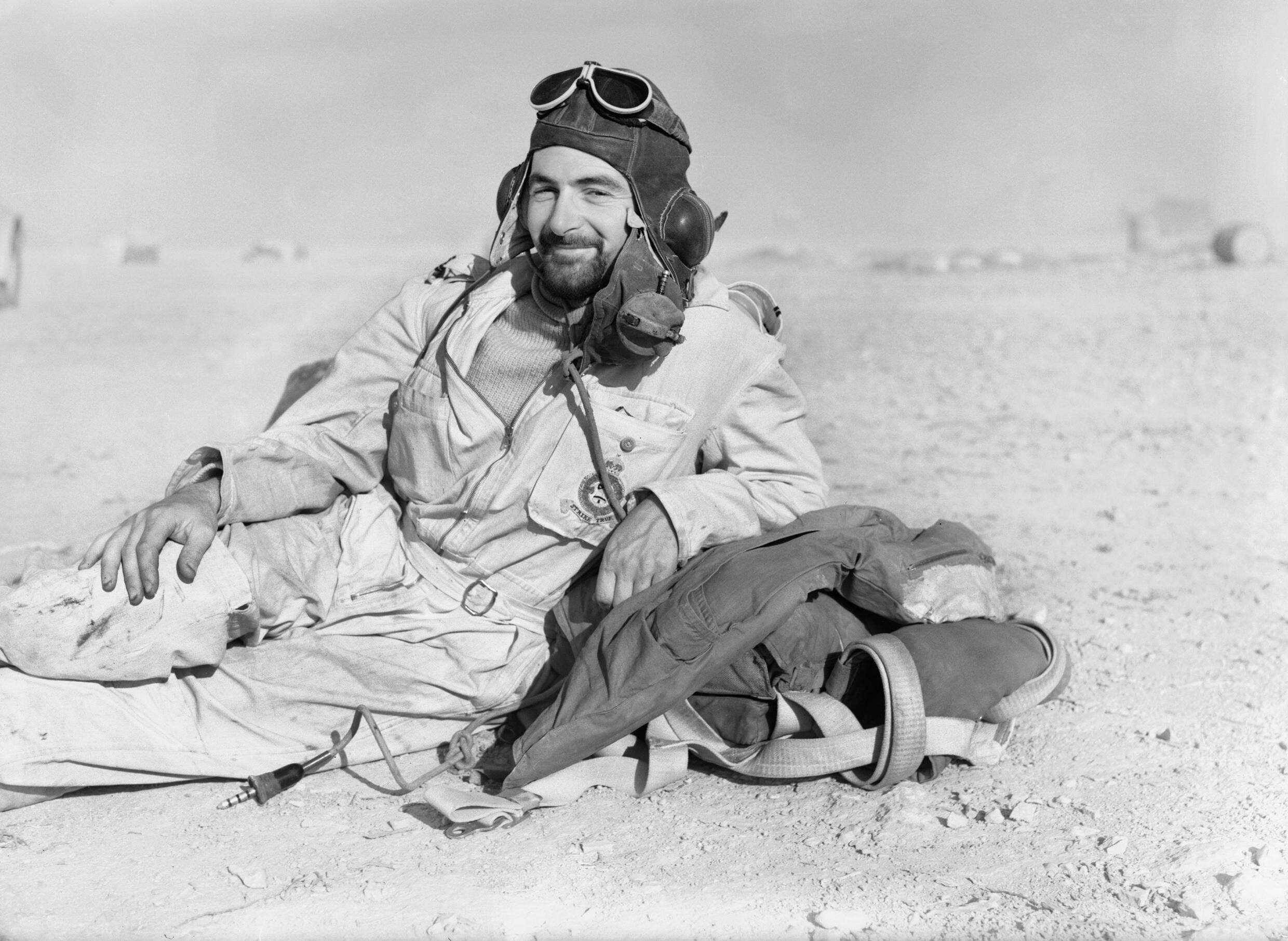
- Ernest Mason in his flying kit
- Born: 29 July 1913; Darlington, England
- Died: 15 February 1942 (aged 28); Martuba, British-occupied Egypt
- Military career
- Allegiance: United Kingdom
- Branch: Royal Air Force
- Service years: 1938–1942
- Rank: Squadron leader
- Nickname: Imshi
- Commands: No. 261 Squadron; No. 94 Squadron
- Conflicts: Second World War: North African Campaign; Siege of Malta; Anglo-Soviet invasion of Iran
- Awards: Distinguished Flying Cross

Ernest Mason DFC (29 July 1913 – 15 February 1942) was a British flying ace of the Royal Air Force (RAF) during the Second World War. He was credited with at least fifteen aerial victories.

Born in Darlington, Mason joined the RAF in 1938. At the start of the Second World War, he was serving with No. 80 Squadron in Egypt but saw little action with this unit. In August 1940, his flight formed the basis of No. 274 Squadron and he flew extensively during the Libyan campaign later in the year and into early 1942. During this time, he achieved the majority of his aerial victories. From March to April he flew with No. 261 Squadron from Malta as part of the island's defensive fighter force. He was injured on 13 April when he crash landed his Hawker Hurricane fighter into the sea after it was damaged during a dogfight. Appointed commander of No. 261 Squadron he led it during the Allied occupation of Iran. He subsequently commanded No. 94 Squadron and was killed during its first sortie with P-40 Kittyhawk fighters.

== Early life ==
Ernest Mitchelson Mason was born in Darlington, in County Durham, the United Kingdom, on 29 July 1913, the son of E. Mason and his wife Teresa, who were from Blackpool. Mason went to school at Blackpool Grammar and was musically minded, playing the saxophone. He was also interested in engineering and mechanics and acquired a motorcycle when he was 14. The following year he began participating in dirt track racing. He joined the Royal Air Force (RAF) on a short service commission in March 1938.

Commissioned as an acting pilot officer on 7 March 1938, Mason underwent training at No. 4 Flying Training School in Egypt. He was confirmed as pilot officer on 7 March 1939. He was initially posted to a bomber squadron but subsequently arranged a transfer to No. 80 Squadron, a unit of Fighter Command, by the time of the outbreak of the Second World War.

== Second World War ==
No. 80 Squadron, equipped with Gloster Gladiator bi-plane fighters, was based at Ismailia in Egypt and tasked with the defence of the Suez Canal for the initial months of the Second World War. It was not until after Italy entered the conflict in June 1940 that the squadron began to be involved in aerial engagements. However, Mason himself did not see action although he was part of the squadron's 'A' Flight that began to receive the Hawker Hurricane fighter and in August this formed the basis of No. 274 Squadron. Mason was promoted to flying officer early the following month.

=== Libyan campaign ===
During Operation Compass, the British offensive against Italian forces in Egypt and Libya, No. 274 Squadron was regularly in action, carrying out patrols over and in front of the advancing troops. On 9 December 1940, the opening day of the offensive, Mason achieved his first aerial victories, one of five pilots sharing in the destruction of two Savoia-Marchetti SM.79 medium bombers and damaging of three others in the Sidi Barrani area. Later in the day he flew another sortie, engaging and damaging a Fiat CR.42 fighter. Two day later he destroyed a CR.42 over Sidi Barrani and then on 15 December, shot down a SM.79 in around the Bardia-Sollum area. He destroyed another CR.42 on 16 December over Bardia although military aviation historians Christopher Shores and Clive Williams suggest that this may have been officially recorded as being a probable.

On 22 December, Mason shot down a SM.79 to the west of Fort Capuzzo and also damaged another of the same type. The next day he destroyed a Caproni Ca.310, a twin-engined reconnaissance aircraft over El Gubbi. By this stage of the campaign, the squadron was also involved in making ground attacks on Italian troops and carrying bomber escort missions.

During January 1941, Mason regularly carried out intruder sorties into Italian-held territory in Libya, targeting airfields of the Regia Aeronautica (Royal Italian Air Force). On these often successful sorties, he was typically only accompanied by one pilot. He destroyed a pair of CR.42s over Gambut on 3 January. He and his fellow pilot strafed an airfield at Gazala on 8 January, and between the two of them shared in destroying thirteen SM.79s. The following day, on a sortie to Martuba, he shot down a CR.42. He also caught and destroyed a Fiat CR.32 fighter on the ground. On 10 January he destroyed a SM.79 over Derna and damaged a Fiat G.50 fighter.

On 26 January Mason shot down three CR.42s to the west of Martuba. These successes were followed four days later with another CR.42 destroyed, this time over Benina Airfield. The following month the squadron returned to Egypt for a period of rest. Mason was noted for his eccentricities; he had grown a dense beard and acquired the nickname 'Imshi', this being an Arabic colloquialism for scram, which Mason supposedly used to deter peddlers. He was by this time also the leading Allied ace of the Libyan campaign. Officially credited with thirteen aerial victories, he was subsequently awarded the Distinguished Flying Cross. The citation, published in The London Gazette on 11 February 1941, read:

In January, 1941, this officer destroyed three of a formation of nine enemy aircraft. He has continually shown a fine fighting spirit and has contributed materially to the heavy losses caused to enemy aircraft. He has shown outstanding courage and initiative and has destroyed at least thirteen hostile aircraft".

— London Gazette, No. 35073, 11 February 1941

=== Malta ===
In March, Mason led a flight of Hurricanes to the Mediterranean island of Malta to supplement the defensive fighter force stationed there. Flying with No. 261 Squadron on 13 April, Mason engaged and destroyed a Messerschmitt Bf 109 fighter of the Luftwaffe. However he was attacked in turn by a Bf 109 of Jagdgeschwader 26 (Fighter Wing 26) and had to ditch his aircraft in the sea, breaking his nose in the process. Rescued, he was repatriated to Egypt for medical treatment.

=== Later war service ===
In July, following his recovery, Mason was promoted to squadron leader and assumed command of No. 261 Squadron which, having been briefly disbanded, was reforming with Hurricanes in Habbiyana in Iraq at the time. In August he led the unit in the Allied occupation of Iran. Its primary duty was patrolling over the ports at Abadan and Khorramshahr but it also intercepted aircraft of the Imperial Iranian Air Force. On 26 August Mason shot down a Hawker Nisr light bomber. Later in the year the squadron operated in Palestine.

At the start of 1942, Mason was posted back to Egypt to command No. 94 Squadron. His new unit was non-operational at the time, due to being in the process of reequipping with P-40 Kittyhawk fighters. Its first operational sortie with the Kittyhawks was on 15 February, when Mason led a ground attack mission against a Luftwaffe base at Martuba. His aircraft was shot down by Otto Schulz from Jagdgeschwader 27 (Fighter Wing 27) and he was killed. He is commemorated on the Alamein Memorial in Egypt.

Shores and Williams credit Mason with the sole destruction of fifteen Italian and German aircraft, with another two shared with other pilots. He also damaged six aircraft, three of which were shared with others. Fourteen more aircraft, all Italian, were destroyed on the ground although only one was solely credited to Mason; the others were shared.

== Bibliography ==
- Rawlings, John (1976). Fighter Squadrons of the RAF and their Aircraft. London: MacDonald & James. ISBN 0-354-01028-X.
- Shores, Christopher; Williams, Clive (1994). Aces High: A Tribute to the Most Notable Fighter Pilots of the British and Commonwealth Forces in WWII. London: Grub Street. ISBN 1-8-9869-7000.
- Thomas, Andrew (2005). Tomahawk and Kittyhawk Aces of the RAF and Commonwealth. Oxford: Osprey Publishing. ISBN 978-1-84176-083-4.
