= El Borj =

El Borj البرج
- commune
- Location within Morocco
- Coordinates: 33.0150°N 5.6309°W
- Country: Morocco
- Region: Béni Mellal-Khénifra
- Province: Khénifra

Population (2004)
  - Total: 4,985
- Time zone: UTC+0 (GMT)

El Borj is a commune in Khénifra Province, Béni Mellal-Khénifra, Morocco. At the time of the 2004 census, the commune had a total population of 4985 people living in 920 households.
