= James Francis Edwards =

Royal Canadian Air Force officer (1921–2022)

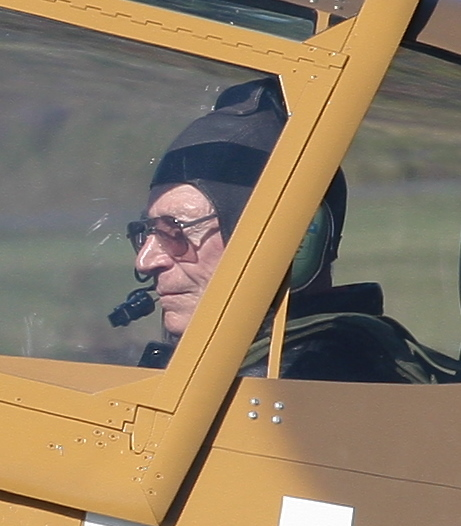
- Edwards in 2009
- Born: 5 June 1921; Nokomis, Saskatchewan, Canada
- Died: 14 May 2022 (aged 100); Comox, British Columbia, Canada
- Military career
- Allegiance: Canada
- Branch: Royal Canadian Air Force
- Service years: 1940–1972
- Rank: Wing Commander
- Nicknames: "Eddie" during WW2 "Stocky" post-war
- Conflicts: World War II: European Theatre; North African Campaign
- Awards: Member of the Order of Canada; Distinguished Flying Cross & Bar; Distinguished Flying Medal; Mention in Despatches; Canadian Forces' Decoration

James Francis Edwards, CM, DFC & Bar, DFM, CD (5 June 1921 – 14 May 2022), later known as Stocky Edwards, was a Canadian fighter pilot during World War II. With 19 confirmed aerial victories, Edwards was Canada's highest scoring ace in the Western Desert Campaign.

== Early life ==
Born in Nokomis, Saskatchewan, Edwards grew up in Battleford, Saskatchewan. After graduating from St Thomas College in 1940 he volunteered for the Royal Canadian Air Force (RCAF).

== World War II ==
Sergeant Edwards was posted to 94 Squadron RAF of 223 Wing in January 1942 flying the Curtiss Kittyhawk. On 23 March, he flew his first operational trip, during which he shot down his first enemy aircraft, a Messerschmitt Bf 109. The only suitable combat loss by Jagdwaffe was Bf 109F-4/Trop, W.Nr. 8740 of 7./JG 27, that crashed after air combat on Martuba airfield with 85% damage. Unknown pilot wasn't injured. In May, he was posted to No. 260 Squadron RAF, and saw intensive action for the rest of 1942. By September, he had 6 "kills" and was commissioned, jumping four grades to the rank of flight lieutenant. He was awarded a Distinguished Flying Medal and Distinguished Flying Cross by the start of 1943, by which time Edwards was a flight commander. His tour finished in May 1943, total claims made being 17 aircraft shot down and several ground kills; in fact, German records show Edwards underclaimed - 22 victories had been confirmed by German records. One of Edwards' victims during the North African campaign was famous Luftwaffe experten Otto Schulz (51 victories), who was shot down by the Canadian ace on 17 June 1942. On 3 September 1942, Edwards allegedly damaged Hans-Joachim Marseille's Bf 109 in combat. Marseille was the highest scoring pilot in North Africa, and shot down more Western Allied aircraft than any other German pilot. The problem is that RLM did not list single damaged Bf 109 of that day in Africa. Marseilles aircraft was damaged on 23.5.42 only. Three days later, Edwards was the pilot who was believed to have shot down and killed Günter Steinhausen. Though Edwards claimed only a damaged enemy aircraft, it appears this is another victory for which he did not receive full credit.

In November 1943, Edwards was posted to No. 417 Squadron RCAF, then No. 92 Squadron RAF, flying the Supermarine Spitfire VIII; while serving on the Italian front with 92 Squadron, he added three Focke-Wulf Fw 190s and a Bf 109 to his score, all shot down over the Anzio beachhead, three of them on a single day. At the beginning of March 1944, he was posted to the UK, flying operations over Europe with No. 274 Squadron RAF, a fighter unit equipped, at the end of Edwards' tour, with the Hawker Tempest.

After leave in Canada, Edwards returned to the Western Front, flying Spitfire XVIs as the commanding officer of 127 RCAF Wing in 1945. On 3 May, he shared in the destruction of a Junkers Ju 88, just a few days before VE Day. He finished the war with a total of 373 operational sorties without being shot down by the enemy.

According to Shores and Williams' Aces High, his final wartime score was 15 + 3 shared destroyed, with 9 more destroyed on the ground. Brown and Lavigne's Canadian Wing Commander credits him with 19 victories, 2 shared, 6.5 probable, 17 damaged and 12 destroyed on the ground. During an interview, Edwards himself specified that he had 19 confirmed victories during the war. Many who flew with him have said that he only reported those "kills" he was certain of and that his real number of aerial victories was probably much higher than officially reported. Eighteen of Edwards' 19 victories, according to Brown and Lavigne, were enemy fighters (14 Bf 109s, 3 Fw 190s and one Macchi C.202).

== Post-war ==
Edwards stayed in the RCAF until after amalgamation and retired from the Canadian Forces in 1972 as a lieutenant colonel. In that time, he flew Vampires, Sabres and CF-100s both in Canada and overseas. Edwards was a key player in the post-war air force as his experience and leadership were used to train new pilots.

In 1983, Edwards and Michel Lavigne published a book about his wartime experiences entitled Kittyhawk pilot: Wing Commander J.F. (Stocky) Edwards.

Also in 2009, Edwards was honoured as one of the 100 most influential Canadians in aviation and had his name included with the others on the 2009 CF-18 Centennial of Flight demonstration Hornet.

Edwards died on 14 May 2022, at the age of 100.

== Vintage Wings of Canada ==
As part of their continued effort to honour and commemorate his achievements (along with those of all veterans), Vintage Wings of Canada has decorated their P-40N in the markings flown by "Stocky" in Africa. On 19 September 2009, Vintage Wings took him for a flight over Ottawa in this P-40 giving him a chance to fly it as well.

Vintage Wings has also published stories on Stocky Edwards including the following:

- A Visit From A Living Legend.
- Flying With The Ace

== Decorations ==
- Distinguished Flying Medal
- Distinguished Flying Cross (UK) and Bar
- Mentioned in Dispatches
- Canadian Forces' Decoration and Two Clasps
- Member of Order of Canada 10 December 2004
- Queen Elizabeth II Diamond Jubilee Medal March 2012
- Canadian Aviation Hall of Fame member. May 2013
- Legion of Honour, France. Chevalier (Knight). 28 November 2014
