= Ait Saadelli =

- commune
- Interactive map of Ait Saadelli
- Coordinates: 32.6763°N 5.3328°W
- Country: Morocco
- Region: Béni Mellal-Khénifra
- Province: Khénifra

Population (2004)
  - Total: 2,621
- Time zone: UTC+0 (GMT)

Ait Saadelli is a commune in Khénifra Province, Béni Mellal-Khénifra, Morocco. At the time of the 2004 census, the commune had a total population of 2621 people living in 486 households.
