= Sidi Yahya Ou Saad =

Coordinates: 32°41′N 5°35′W

- commune
- Interactive map of Sidi Yahya Ou Saad
- Country: Morocco
- Region: Béni Mellal-Khénifra
- Province: Khénifra

Population (2004)
  - Total: 8,559
- Time zone: UTC+0 (GMT)

Sidi Yahya Ou Saad is a commune in the Khénifra Province, Béni Mellal-Khénifra, Morocco. At the time of the 2004 census, the commune had a total population of 8559 people living in 1662 households.
