= Sidi Hcine =

Sidi Hcine سيدي حسين
- commune
- Interactive map of Sidi Hcine
- Coordinates: 33.0541°N 5.9984°W
- Country: Morocco
- Region: Béni Mellal-Khénifra
- Province: Khenifra

Population (2004)
  - Total: 3,614
- Time zone: UTC+0 (GMT)

Sidi Hcine is a commune in Khénifra Province, Béni Mellal-Khénifra, Morocco. At the time of the 2004 census, the commune had a total population of 3614 people living in 597 households.
