= Aguelmous =

Aguelmous اكلموس ⴰⴳⵍⵎⵓⵙ
- Town
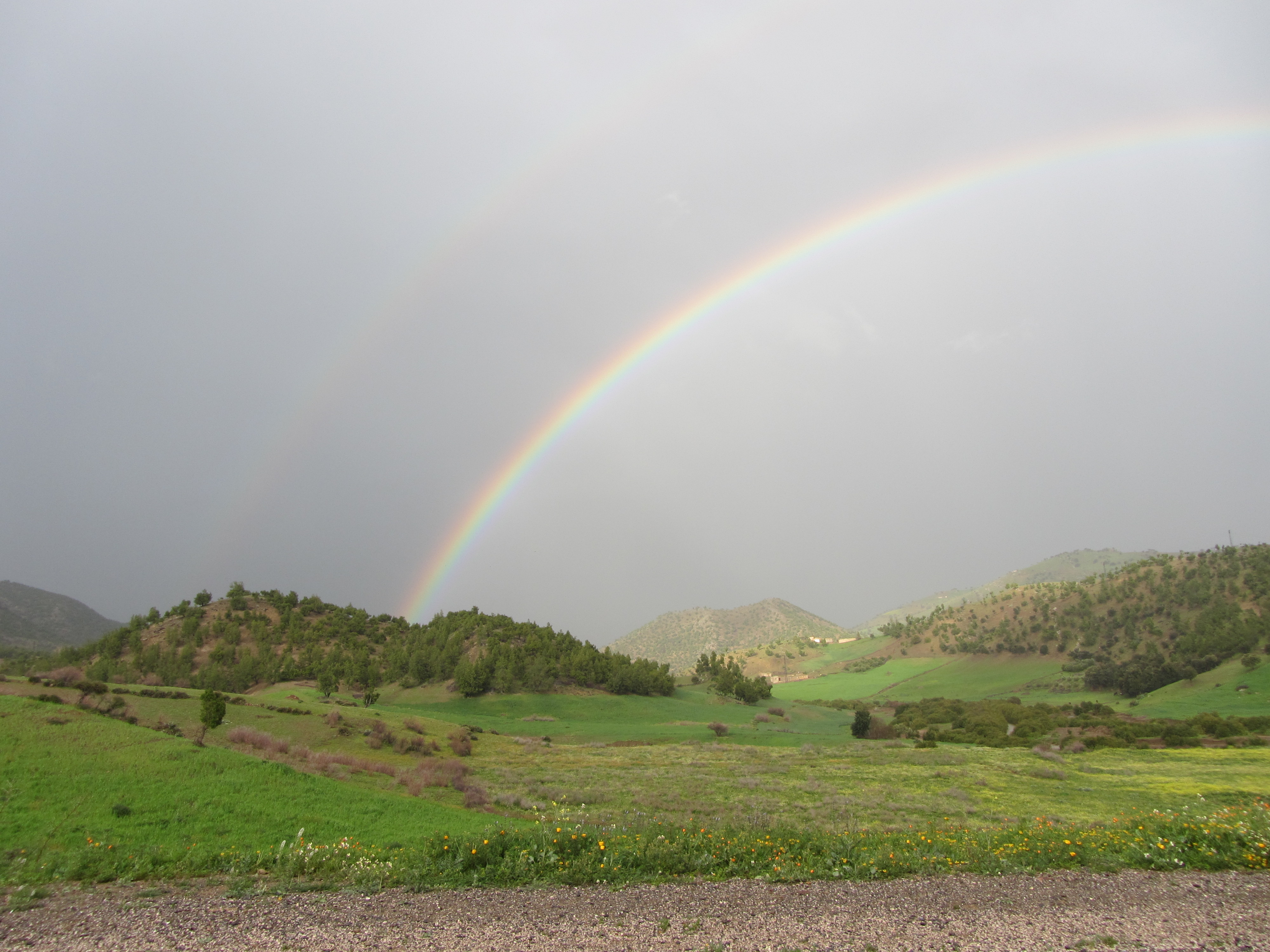
- Rainbow over Aguelmous
- Interactive map of Aguelmous
- Coordinates: 33°9′N 5°50′W
- Country: Morocco
- Region: Béni Mellal-Khénifra
- Province: Khénifra Province

Population (2004)
  - Total: 11,390
- Time zone: UTC+0 (GMT)
- Postal code: 54052

Aguelmous is a town and rural commune in Khénifra Province, Béni Mellal-Khénifra, Morocco. According to the 2004 census it had a population of 11,390.
