= Sebt Ait Rahou =

- commune
- Interactive map of Sebt Ait Rahou
- Coordinates: 33.2152°N 6.2606°W
- Country: Morocco
- Region: Béni Mellal-Khénifra
- Province: Khenifra

Population (2004)
  - Total: 10,209
- Time zone: UTC+0 (GMT)

Sebt Ait Rahou is a commune in Khénifra Province, Béni Mellal-Khénifra, Morocco. At the time of the 2004 census, the commune had a total population of 10,209 people living in 1896 households.
