= Aguelmam Azegza =

- commune
- Interactive map of Aguelmam Azegza
- Coordinates: 32.9479°N 5.4089°W
- Country: Morocco
- Region: Béni Mellal-Khénifra
- Province: Khénifra

Population (2004)
  - Total: 8,817
- Time zone: UTC+0 (GMT)

Aguelmam Azegza is a commune in Khénifra Province, Béni Mellal-Khénifra, Morocco. At the time of the 2004 census, the commune had a total population of 8817 people living in 1585 households.
