= Sidi Amar, Morocco =

Sidi Amar سيدي عمار
- commune
- Interactive map of Sidi Amar
- Coordinates: 32.9508°N 5.8341°W
- Country: Morocco
- Region: Béni Mellal-Khénifra
- Province: Khenifra

Population (2004)
  - Total: 2,762
- Time zone: UTC+0 (GMT)

Sidi Amar is a commune in Khénifra Province, Béni Mellal-Khénifra, Morocco. At the time of the 2004 census, the commune had a total population of 2762 people living in 521 households.
