= Had Bouhssoussen =

Coordinates: 33°08′55″N 6°04′47″W

Had Bouhssoussen أحد بوحسوسن
- Town
- Interactive map of Had Bouhssoussen
- Country: Morocco
- Region: Béni Mellal-Khénifra
- Province: Khénifra Province

Population (2004)
  - Total: 2,421
- Time zone: UTC+0 (GMT)

Had Bouhssoussen is a town in Khénifra Province, Béni Mellal-Khénifra, Morocco. According to the 2004 census it has a population of 2421.
