= Ouaoumana =

Coordinates: 32.7128°N 5.8042°W

- commune
- Location within Morocco
- Country: Morocco
- Region: Béni Mellal-Khénifra
- Province: Khénifra

Population (2004)
  - Total: 7,846
- Time zone: UTC+0 (GMT)

Ouaoumana is a commune in Khénifra Province of the Béni Mellal-Khénifra administrative region of Morocco. At the time of the 2004 census, the commune had a total population of 7846 people living in 1647 households.
