= Kehf Nsour =

- Town
- Location in Morocco
- Coordinates: 32.9140°N 5.9616°W
- Country: Morocco
- Region: Béni Mellal-Khénifra
- Province: Khénifra

Population (2004)
  - Total: 5,089
- Time zone: UTC+0 (GMT)

Kehf Nsour is a town in Khénifra Province, Béni Mellal-Khénifra, Morocco. According to the 2004 census it has a population of 5089.
