= Kerrouchen =

- Town
- Location within Morocco
- Coordinates: 32°47′N 5°19′W
- Country: Morocco
- Region: Béni Mellal-Khénifra
- Province: Khénifra

Population (2004)
  - Total: 1,967
- Time zone: UTC+0 (GMT)

Kerrouchen is a town in Khénifra Province, Béni Mellal-Khénifra, Morocco. According to the 2004 census it has a population of 1967.
