= M'rirt =

M'rirt ⵎⵔⵉⵔⵜ/مريرت
- City
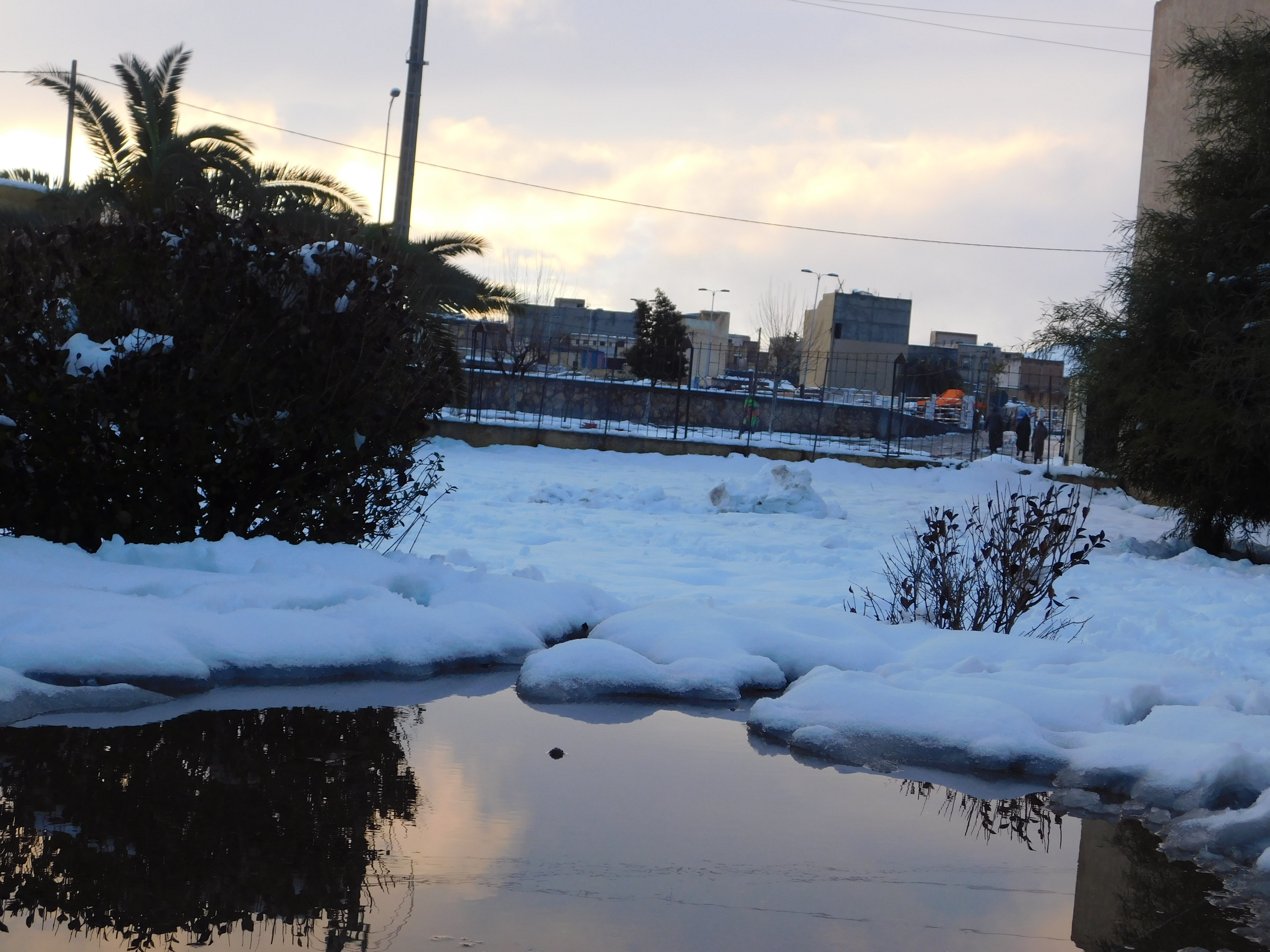
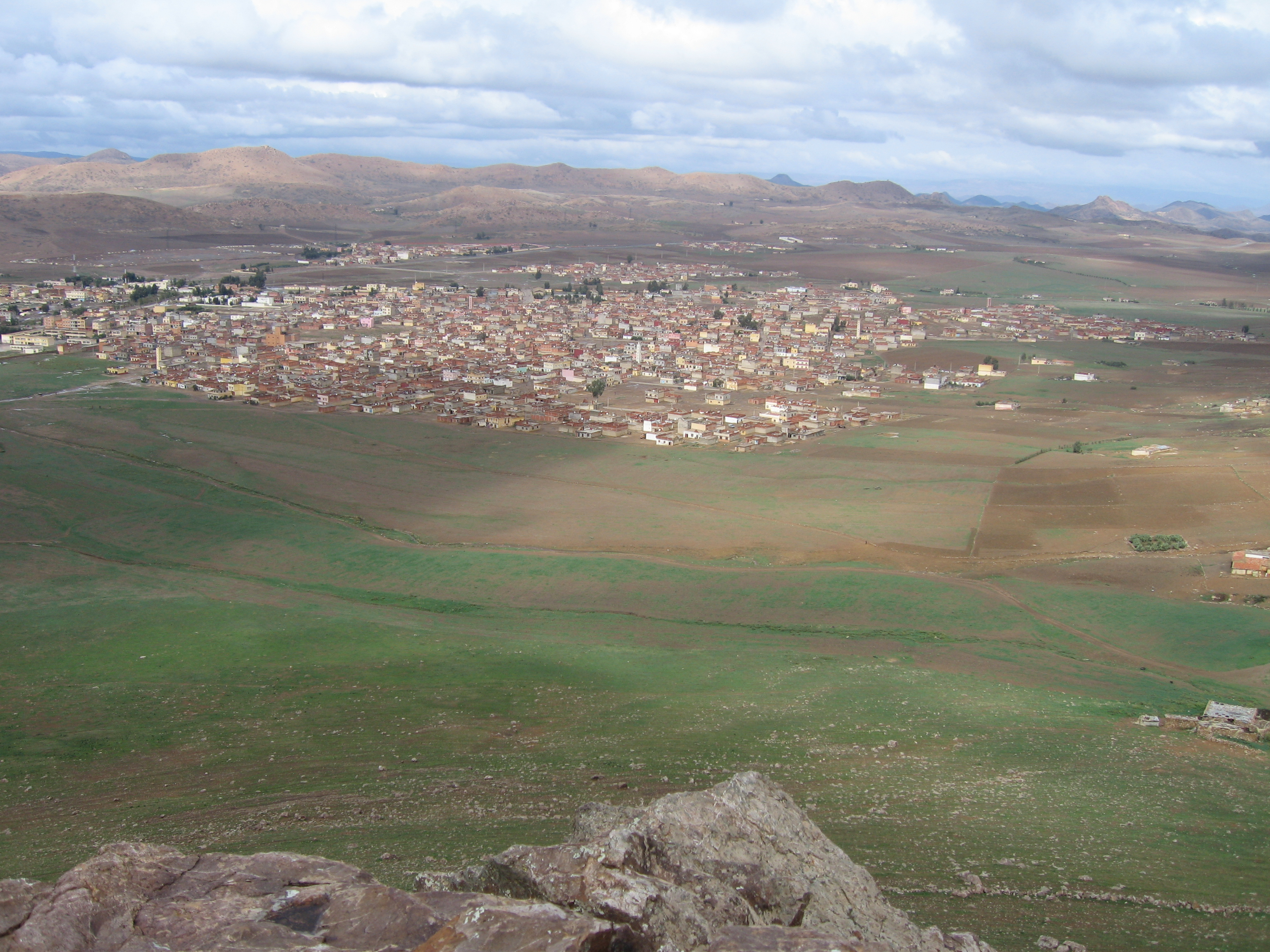
- Interactive map of M'rirt
- Coordinates: 33°09′48″N 5°33′58″W
- Country: Morocco
- Region: Béni Mellal-Khénifra
- Province: Khénifra

Population (2024)
  - Total: 46,285
- Time zone: UTC+0 (GMT)

M'rirt (Standard Moroccan Tamazight: ⵎⵔⵉⵔⵜ; Arabic: مريرت) is a city in Khénifra Province, Béni Mellal-Khénifra, Morocco. According to the 2024 Moroccan census, it had a population of 46,285.

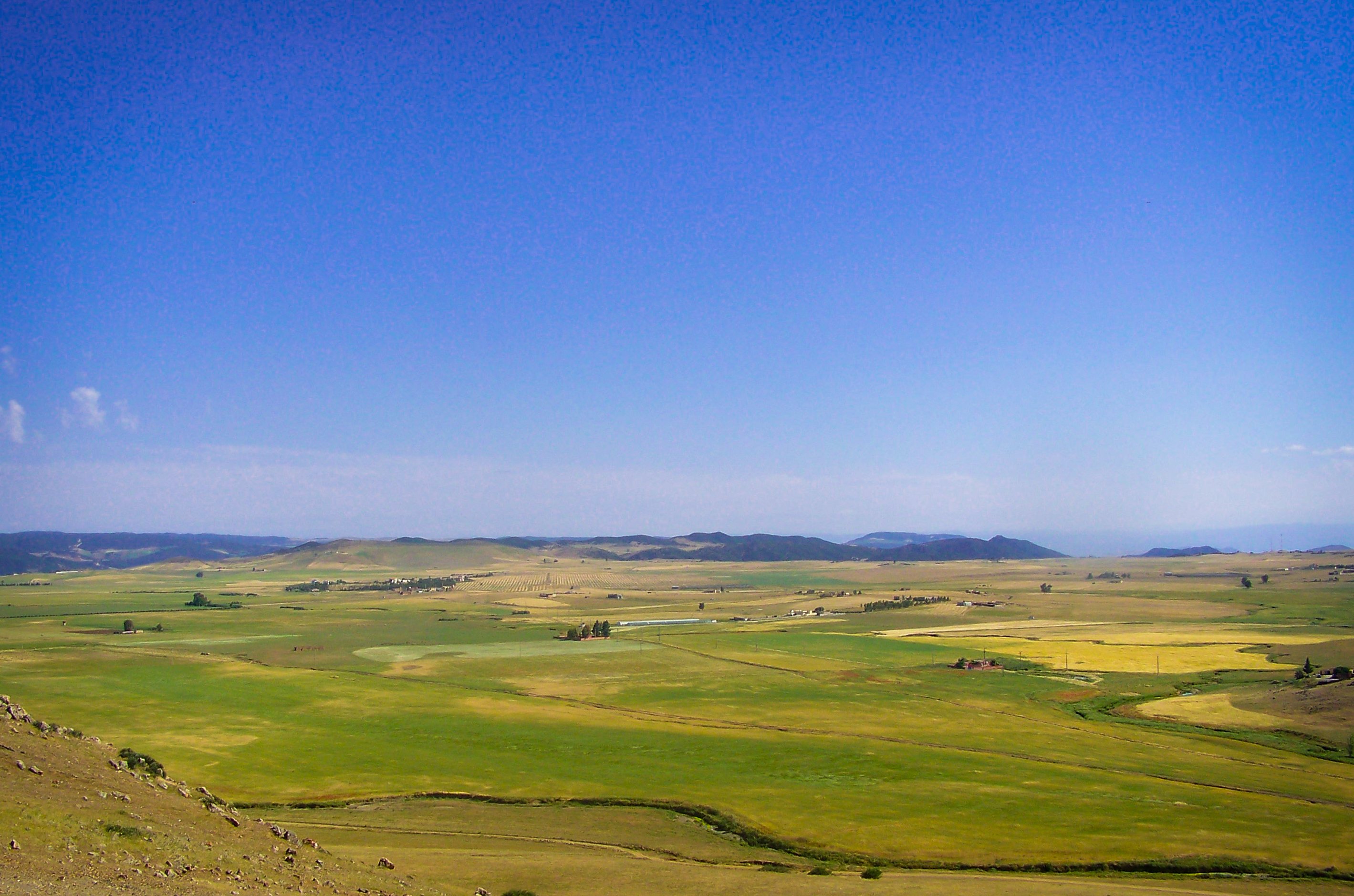
M'rirt surrounding area

== Notable people ==
- Younes Abouyaaqoub and Houssaine Abouyaaqoub: terrorists responsible for the 2017 Cataluña terrorist attacks
