= Oum Rabia (commune) =

Oum Rabia أم الربيع
- commune
- Interactive map of Oum Rabia
- Coordinates: 33.0562°N 5.4147°W
- Country: Morocco
- Region: Béni Mellal-Khénifra
- Province: Khenifra

Population (2004)
  - Total: 11,314
- Time zone: UTC+0 (GMT)

Oum Rabia is a commune in Khénifra Province, Béni Mellal-Khénifra, Morocco. At the time of the 2004 census, the commune had a total population of 11,314 people living in 2033 households.
