= Tighassaline =

Tighassaline تيغسالين ⵜⵉⵖⵙⵙⴰⵍⵉⵏ
- Town
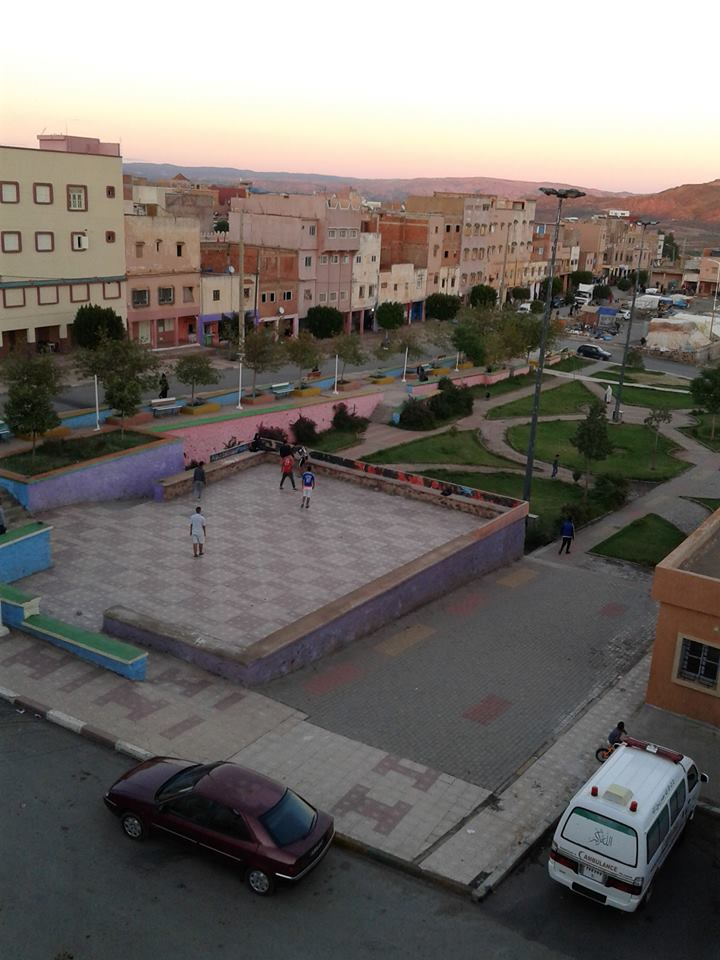
- Interactive map of Tighassaline
- Coordinates: 32°47′N 5°39′W
- Country: Morocco
- Region: Béni Mellal-Khénifra
- Province: Khénifra

Population (2004)
  - Total: 7,336
- Time zone: UTC+0 (GMT)

Tighassaline is a town in Khénifra Province, Béni Mellal-Khénifra, Morocco. According to the 2004 census it has a population of 7336.

It lies on the N8 highway, 26 kilometres south of Khénifra. Tighassaline hosts a weekly souk on Saturday, located at the northern edge of the town. The town is situated on a hill in a Middle Atlas valley, hemmed in by various mountains. To the south, Sidi Bou Ali sits near the top of Jbel al Bocta.
