= Fouka, Egypt =

Settlement in Egypt

Fouka فوكة Fukah, Fuka
- Location in Egypt
- Coordinates: 31°04′N 27°55′E
- Country: Egypt
- Governorate: Matrouh Governorate
- Time zone: UTC+2 (EET)
  - Summer (DST): UTC+3 (EEST)

Fouka or Fukah (Arabic: فوكة) is a locale in the Matrouh Governorate in northern Egypt. Fouka and other communities neighbouring Fouka Bay are seen as promising sites for development by the Egyptian real estate and tourism industries.
