= El Hammam =

- commune
- Interactive map of El Hammam
- Coordinates: 33.1868°N 5.6225°W
- Country: Morocco
- Region: Béni Mellal-Khénifra
- Province: Khénifra

Population (2004)
  - Total: 15,438
- Time zone: UTC+0 (GMT)

El Hammam is a commune in Khénifra Province, Béni Mellal-Khénifra, Morocco. At the time of the 2004 census, the commune had a total population of 15,438 people living in 2887 households.
