= No. 274 Squadron RAF =

British fighter squadron in World War II

- Active: 15 June 1919 – 30 January 1920; 19 August 1940 – 7 September 1945
- Country: United Kingdom
- Branch: Royal Air Force
- Mottos: Latin: Supero ("I overcome")

Insignia
- Squadron Badge heraldry: Eight arrows in saltire
- Squadron Codes: YK (Aug 1940 – Sep 1940); NH Allocated but no evidence of being carried JJ (Apr 1944 – Sep 1945)

No. 274 Squadron RAF existed briefly in 1918 and 1919 as a patrol and bomber squadron, and served in World War II as a fighter squadron.

== History ==
The squadron began to form as a patrol squadron, intended to fly Vickers Vimys, at Seaton Carew in November 1918 a few days before the end of World War I. The squadron formation was then cancelled.

No. 5 (Communication) Squadron formed at Bircham Newton, in 1919, but then became No. 274 Squadron on 15 June 1919. It was a bomber squadron, flying Handley Page V/1500s, but then disbanded after six months, on 30 January 1920.

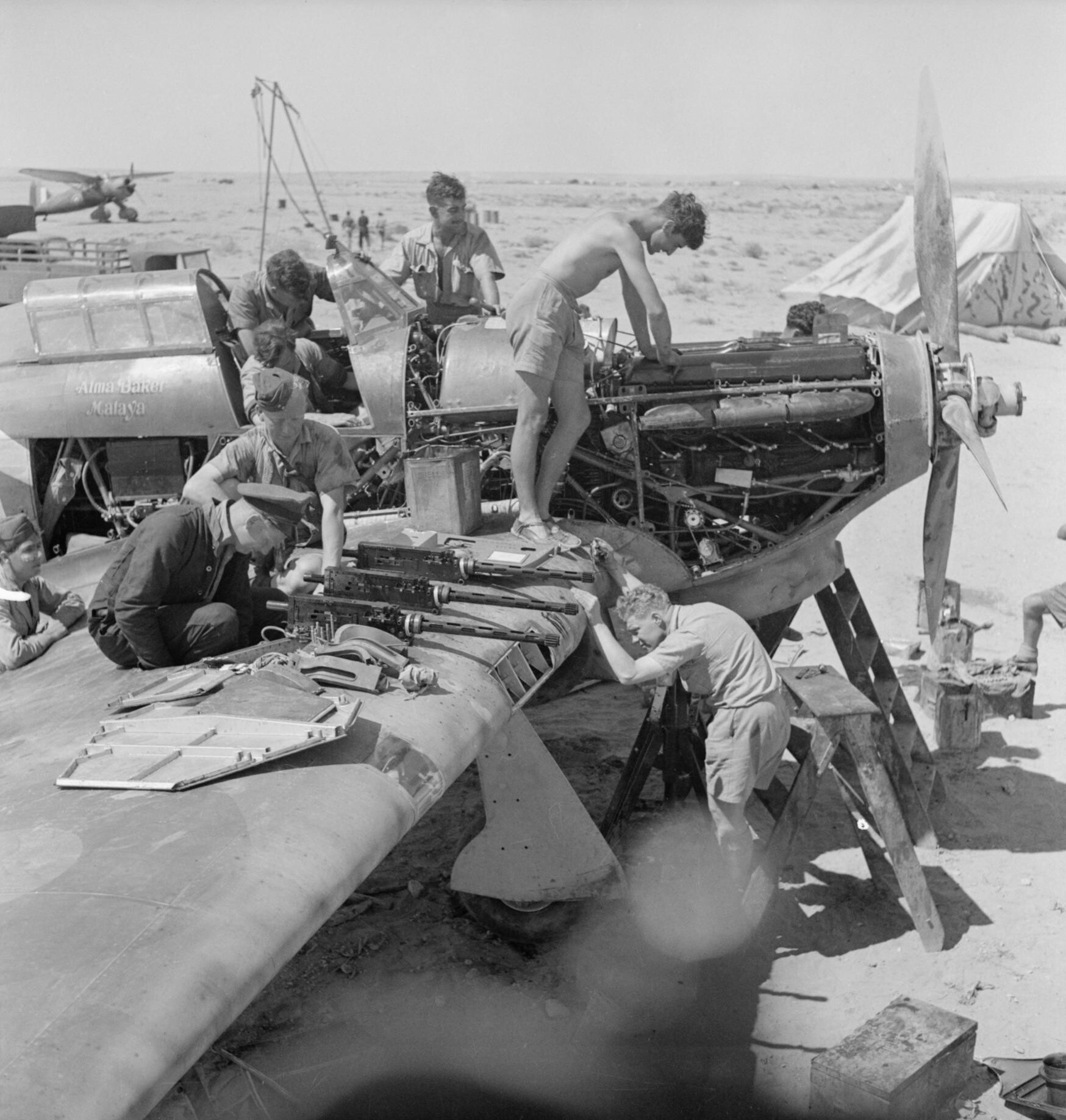
Groundcrew of No. 274 Squadron overhaul a Hawker Hurricane Mark I during the siege of Tobruk.

It was back in action by 1940, equipped with Hawker Hurricanes. For Operation Overlord (the Allied invasion of Normandy) it was equipped with the Spitfire IX F operating from RAF Detling in Air Defence of Great Britain, though under the operational control of RAF Second Tactical Air Force.

In August 1944, the squadron converted to the Hawker Tempest Mk V fighter, which were used to patrol against V-1s. Once the V-1 threat ended, the squadron moved to the continent in September.

== See also ==
- List of Royal Air Force aircraft squadrons
