= Khénifra Province =

Province of Morocco

Coordinates: 32°56′22″N 5°40′03″W

Khénifra Province إقليم خنيفرة ⵜⴰⵙⴳⴰ ⵏ ⵅⵏⵉⴼⵔⴰ
- Province
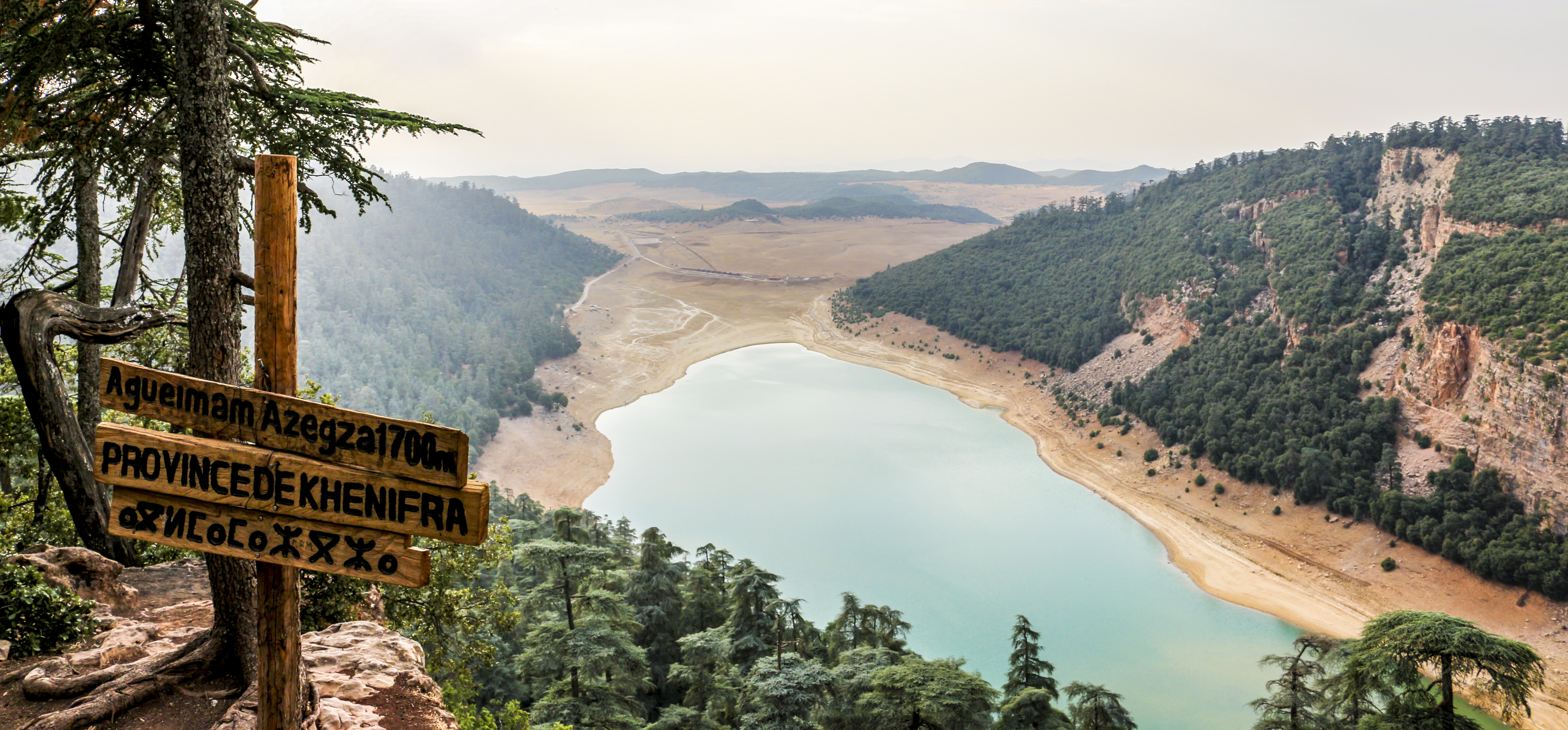
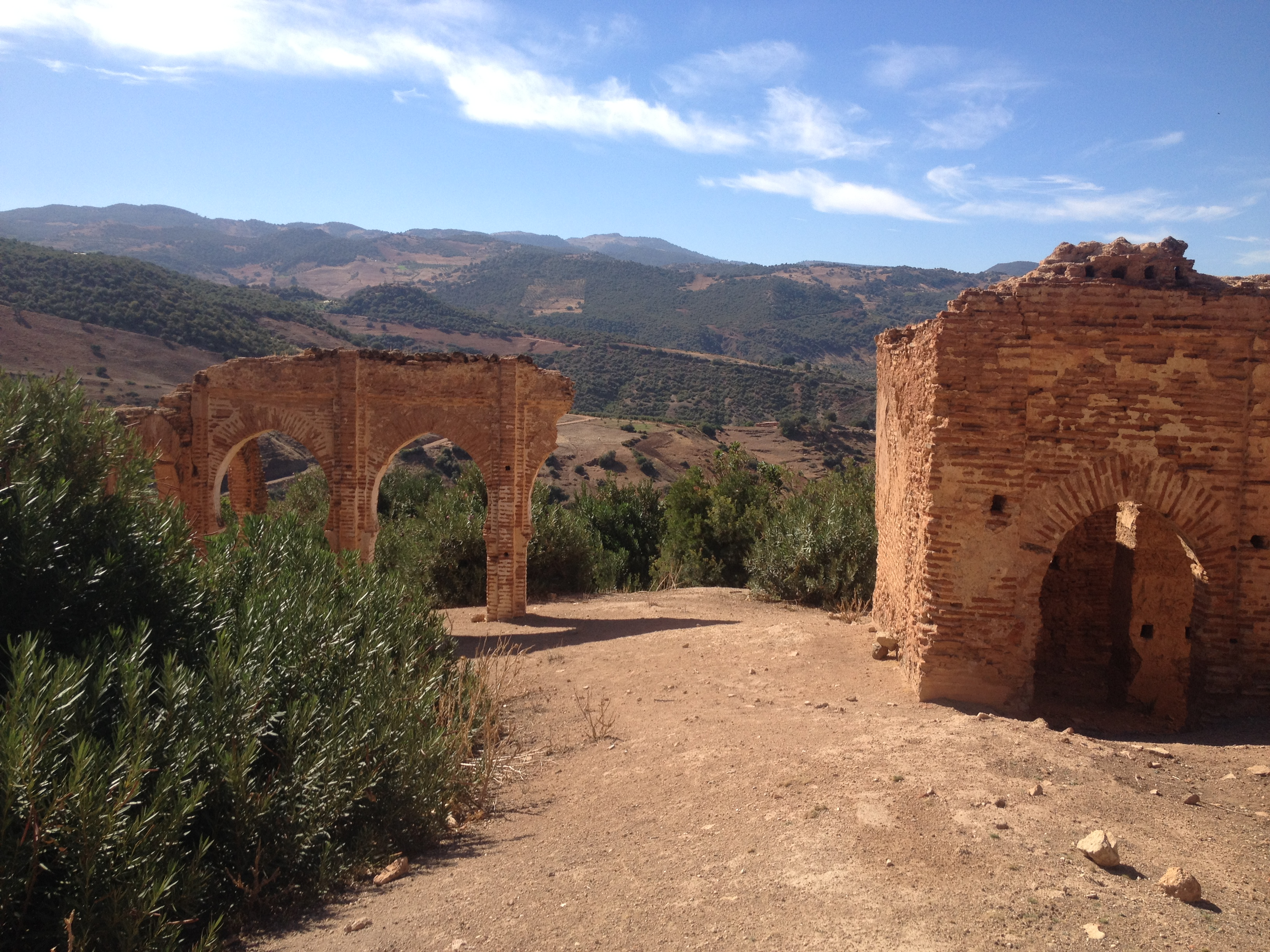
- Lake Aguelmam Azegza Oum Er-Rbia sources Dilaite ruins, Ait Ishaq
- Interactive map of Khénifra Province
- Country: Morocco
- Region: Béni Mellal-Khénifra
- Seat: Khenifra

Population (2024)
  - Total: 370,240

Khénifra (Arabic: خنيفرة, Standard Moroccan Tamazight: ⵅⵏⵉⴼⵔⴰ) is a province in the Moroccan region of Béni Mellal-Khénifra. Its population as of the 2024 census was 370,240 inhabitants.

The major cities are :

- Khenifra
- M'Rirt

== Subdivisions ==
Communes of Khenifra Province

The province is divided administratively into the following:

=== Municipalities ===
| Name | Geographic code | Households (2024) | Population (2024) |
|---|---|---|---|
| Khenifra | 301.01.01. | 34147 | 123738 |
| M'Rirt | 301.01.05. | 13282 | 46285 |

=== Rural communes ===
| Name | Geographic code | Households (2024) | Population (2024) | Notes |
|---|---|---|---|---|
| Aguelmam Azegza | 301.05.01. | 1716 | 6781 | |
| Aguelmous | 301.07.03. | 9374 | 36560 | Urban centre: Aguelmous (17,371 inhabitants; 4,777 households) |
| Ait Ishaq | 301.03.01. | 4975 | 17847 | Urban centre: Ait Ishaq (11,832 inhabitants; 3,498 households) |
| Ait Saadelli | 301.03.03. | 634 | 2629 | |
| El Borj | 301.05.05. | 844 | 3266 | |
| El Hammam | 301.07.07. | 2567 | 9697 | Urban centre: Thighza (1,701 inhabitants; 471 households) |
| El Kbab | 301.03.05. | 3880 | 14580 | Urban centre: El Kbab (7,874 inhabitants; 2,324 households) |
| Had Bouhssoussen | 301.07.09. | 1879 | 7303 | Urban centre: Had Bouhssoussen (3,899 inhabitants; 1,079 households) |
| Kerrouchen | 301.03.07. | 1736 | 6796 | Urban centre: Kerrouchen (2,399 inhabitants; 696 households) |
| Lehri | 301.05.11. | 2113 | 8669 | |
| Moha Ou Hammou Zayani | 301.05.13. | 2763 | 10444 | |
| Moulay Bouazza | 301.07.15. | 2223 | 7621 | Urban centre: Moulay Bouazza (4,835 inhabitants; 1,546 households) |
| Ouaoumana | 301.03.09. | 2483 | 8850 | Urban centre: Ouaoumana (5,774 inhabitants; 1,728 households) |
| Oum Rabia | 301.07.17. | 1959 | 7821 | |
| Sebt Ait Rahou | 301.07.19. | 2125 | 8018 | |
| Sidi Amar | 301.05.21. | 468 | 1625 | |
| Sidi Hcine | 301.07.23. | 576 | 2510 | |
| Sidi Lamine | 301.05.25. | 4279 | 16501 | Urban centre: Kahf Nssar (8,955 inhabitants; 2,415 households) |
| Sidi Yahya Ou Saad | 301.03.11. | 1737 | 6911 | |
| Tighassaline | 301.03.13. | 4399 | 15788 | Urban centre: Tighassaline (9,980 inhabitants; 2,931 households) |
