= Sidi Bennour =

Sidi Bennour سيدي بنور
- City
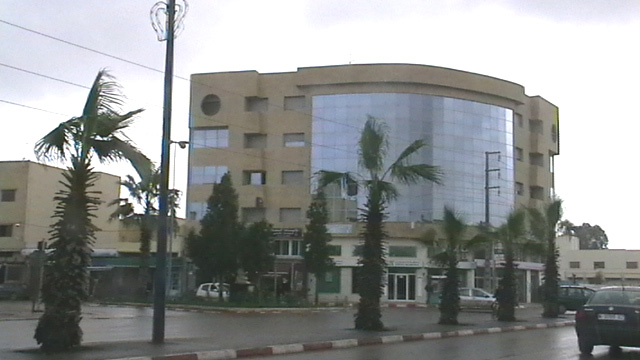
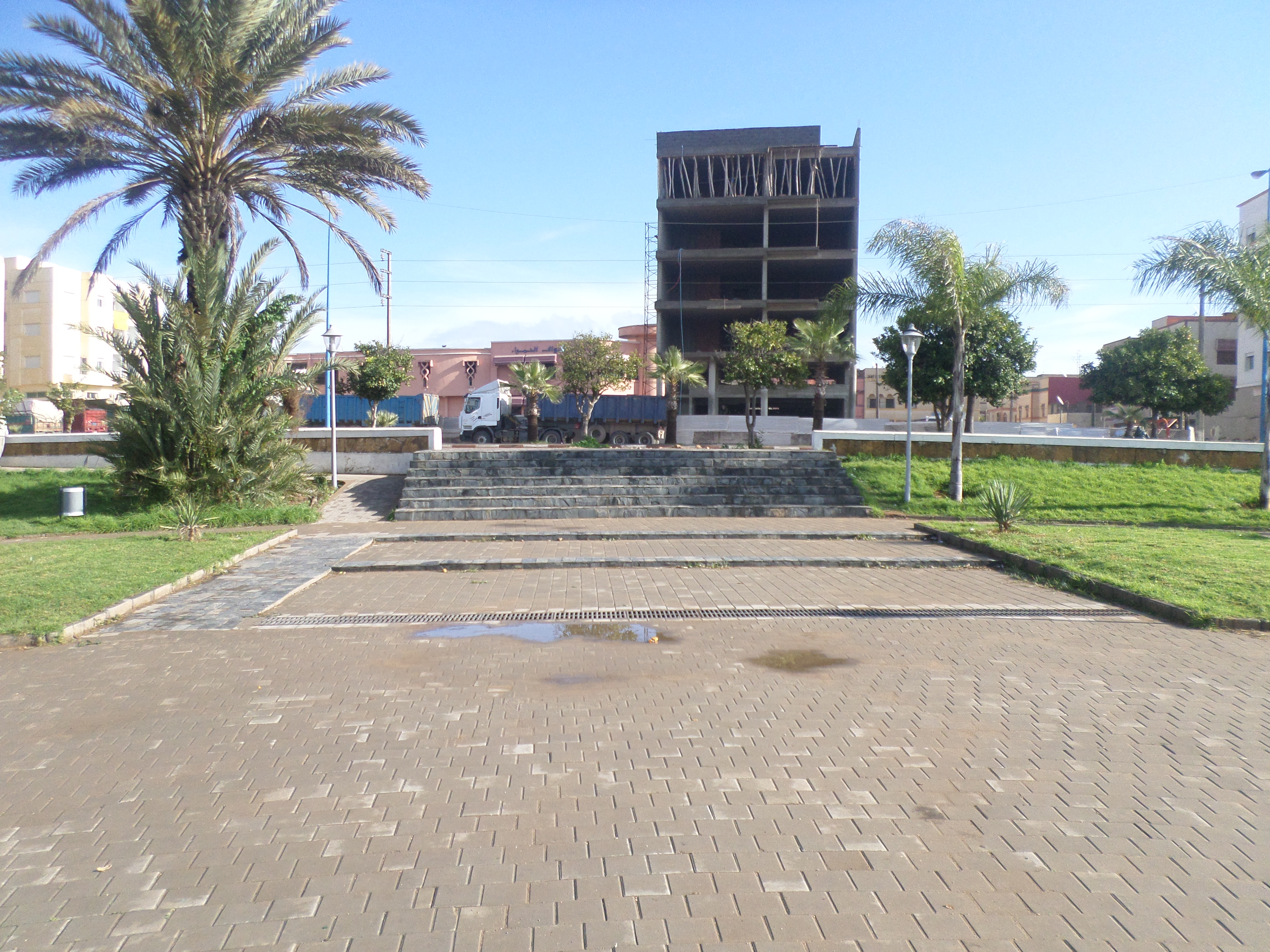
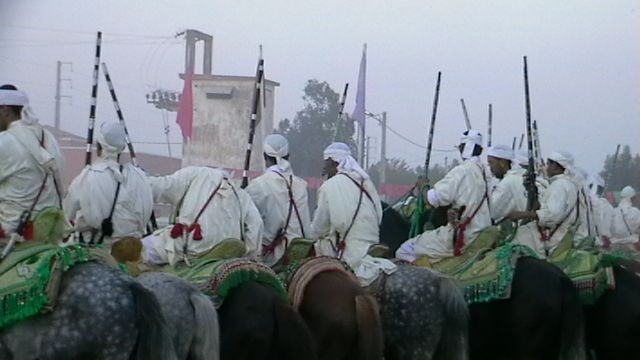
- Interactive map of Sidi Bennour
- Coordinates: 32°39′N 8°26′W
- Country: Morocco
- Region: Casablanca-Settat
- Province: Sidi Bennour

Government
  - Mayor: El hassan Boukouta

Population (2014)
  - Total: 55,815
- Time zone: UTC+0 (GMT)
- Postal code: 24353
- Website: sidibennour.news

Sidi Bennour (Arabic: سيدي بنُّور; Standard Moroccan Tamazight: ⵙⵉⴷⵉ ⴱⵏⵏⵓⵕ) also called Doukkala and Tlat Sidi Bennour, is a Moroccan city in the west of the country belonging to the Sidi Bennour Province and has 55,815 inhabitants (population census) (2014). It is the capital of the Doukkala-Abda region. Sidi Bennour is located about 67 km south of El Jadida, 120 km northwest of Marrakesh, about 100 km east of Safi and 210 km southwest of the Moroccan capital Rabat.

Every Tuesday, the biggest livestock market of Morocco takes place in Sidi Bennour.

== Geography ==
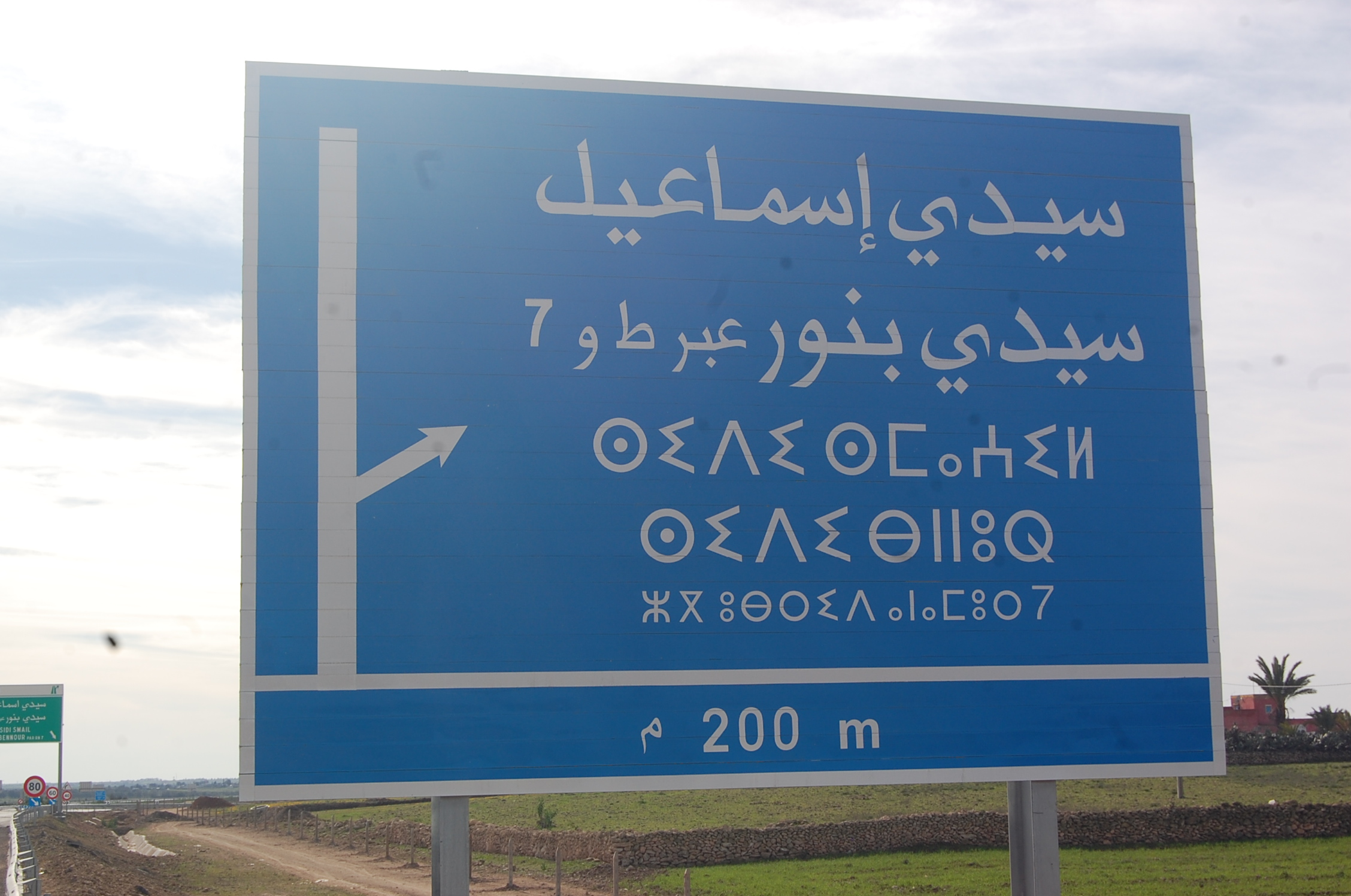
Roadsign

By land, Sidi Bennour is 67 kilometres (41 mi) southwest of El Jadida, 210 kilometres (130 mi) southwest of the Moroccan capital Rabat, 120 kilometres (24 mi) southwest of Marrakesh, 94 kilometres (68 mi) southwest of Settat, 51 kilometres (31 mi) east of Youssoufia, and 100 kilometres (62 mi) northeast of Safi. The city is expanding from the south of the city centre and suburbs such as the centre of the commune of Laatatra, and from the southwest such as Hajj Taher, the commune of Bouhmame and muzawara, from the southeast towards Lkouaoula, and from the east towards Sidi Ahmed El Aouni. To the north, the P2021 road has been built leading north from the city to large villages such as Sidi Smail, and to the west towards Zemamra, which leads from there to the city of Oualidia. To the southeast is the 893-metre (2,930-foot) high Jbel Lakhdar, the last peak of the Atlas Mountains. This mountain is one of the natural borders between the regions of Doukkala (west) and Rehamna (east).

== Economy ==
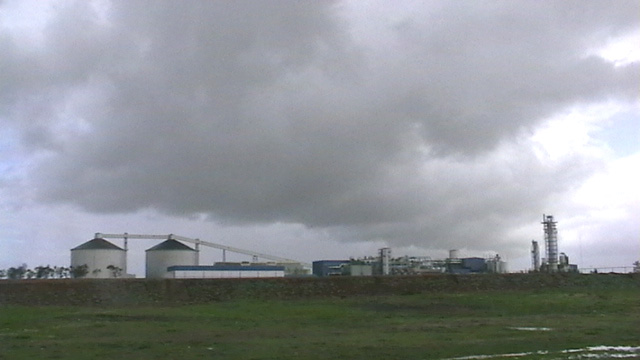
Sugar Factory Cosumar

The city has the biggest sugar factory of Morocco.
