= Doukkala =

Coordinates: 32°39′N 08°26′W

- Natural region
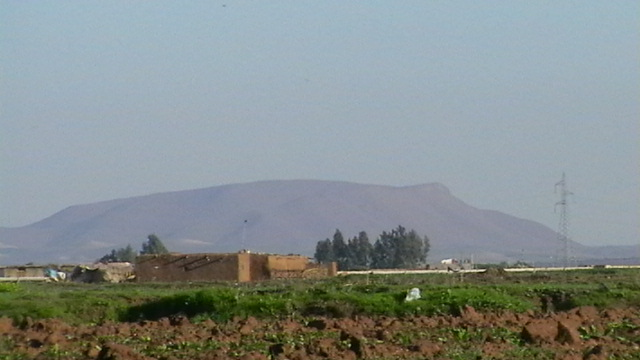
- The "Green Mountain", the only visible hill, east of the region

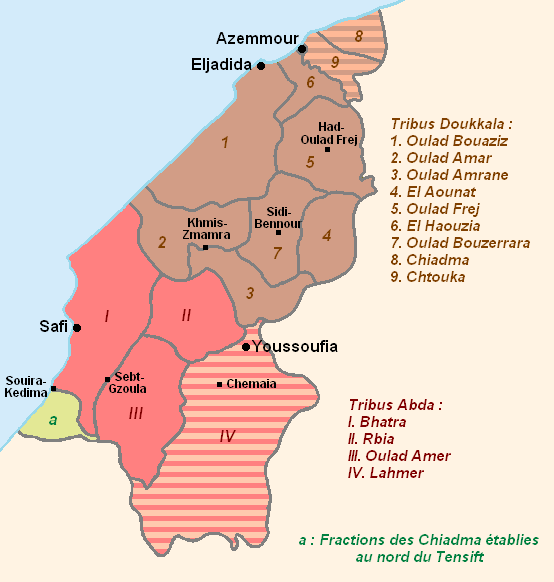
- Map of the tribes of Doukkala and Abda
- Country: Morocco

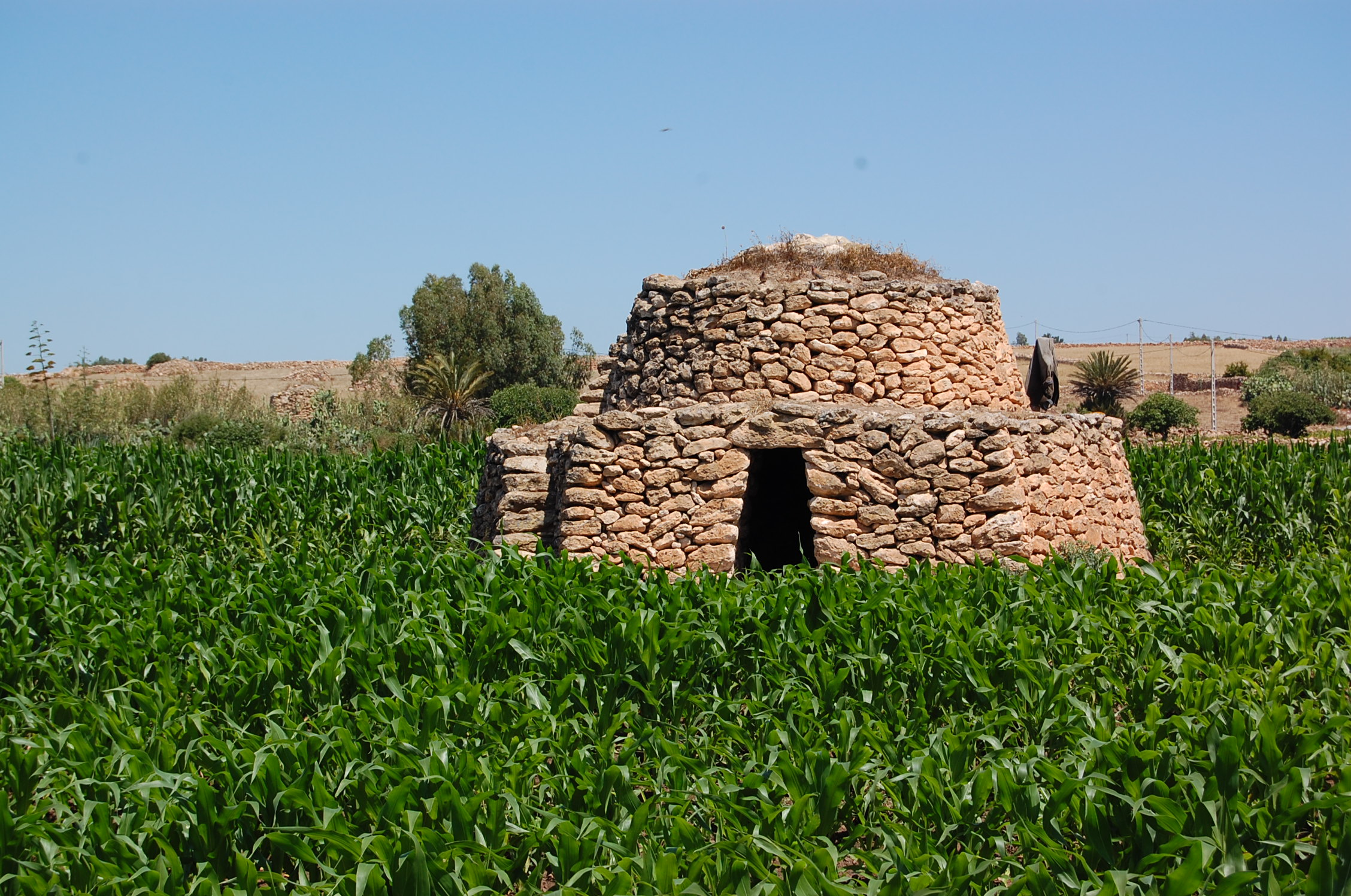
A "tazota", typical old architecture only found in the region

Doukkala (Arabic: دكالة, romanized: Dukkālah) is a natural region of Morocco made of fertile plains and forests. Nowadays it is part of the Casablanca-Settat administrative region.

It is a plain stretching from the Atlantic Ocean south of Sidi Rahal Chatai up to some 50 km further southward and the same distance eastward.

The main urban centers are Sidi Smail, Sidi Bennour, Had Ouled Frej, and Zemamra. Sidi Bennour is the fastest developing center of the four.

It is mainly an agricultural region, with few tourist attractions.

== History ==
Historically, Doukkala referred to a confederation of Berber tribes who occupied the territory between the rivers of Oum Er-Rbia River and Tensift and from the Atlantic Ocean to Jbilate near Marrakesh. . The Pre-Arab Doukkala was inhabited by a mix of majority Masmuda: the Ragrâga, Hazmîra, Banû Dghûgh, Banû Mâgir, and Mushtarayya (Mouchtaraia), together with the SanHâja. The SanHâja occupied the Atlantic coast between Azemmour and south of El Jadida.

Under Abd al-Mumin, there was a revolt led by Yaddar al-Dukkālī from among the Doukkala. It was inspired by Sufis and was called the ahl al-rakawāt (lit. 'the people of the waterskins').

When the Almohads under Abd al-Mu'min captured the town of Marrakesh in 1147, the Doukkals sided against them and in favor of the Almoravid dynasty. They were subsequently defeated by al-Mu'min, and purged, with women and children being sold into slavery. Al-Mu'min brought in less fractious Arab Bedouin tribes as immigrants to settle the area, including the Banu Hilal, a coalition of whom he had defeated earlier in Tunisia. Later immigrants included the al-Ma'qil. The Banu Hilal Arabs were put in here by the Almohad dynasty to place pressure on the Sanhaja Berbers who lived in the region and opposed the Almohads.

By 1250, of the Doukkala, only the Ragrâga had survived intact after their Invasion and some fractions of small Berber tribes.

Ever since the first installation of the Banu Hilal. By the year 1500, Arab made up three quarters of the population and dominated four fifths of the land area. Based on the number of warriors that the Arab could produce according to the historical author Leo Africanus, 100,000, the American scholar Vincent Cornell estimates the Arab population of Doukkala at 375,000. Using the calculated estimate 200,000 for the population of urbanites and Berbers by Moroccan historian Ahmed Boucharb, the total population of Doukkala was estimated at 600,000 by Cornell.

According to anthropologist David Montgomery Hart, the majority of the Doukkala tribal confederation are of Hilalian origin and in the 1960s they had either a sedentarized or semi-sedentarized Bedouin lifestyle preferring animal husbandry over agriculture. They also participated in fantasia also known as laʿb al-barud ("powder play"). Like with other regions in the Atlantic Coast like Chaouia and Chiadma, the Doukkala region is today inhabited by ʕrubis, an ethnically Bedouin group descending from Bedouin tribes who migrated to North Africa in the 11th–13th century. Like with many large tribes in Morocco (like the Ait Atta and Ait Waryaghar), they were divided into khams khmas ("five fifths"). This system was imposed on them by Makhzen for purposes of tax collection and the levying of harzas (soldiers for military expeditions). Despite this division being abandoned during the French protectorate, it remained as a guiding structural principle for Doukkalis and khams khmas is seen as a symbol of strength and power in Morocco.

These tribes and the khoms are:

- Khoms I: Oulad Bu Aziz
- Khoms II: Oulad Bu Zerrara
- Khoms III: Oulad Amar
- Khoms IV: Oulad Frej, Awnat, Oulad Amran
- Khoms V: Hawziya, Chtouka, Chiadma

The Chiadma are related to the Chiadma and Chtouka were from the Chtouka Ait Baha before being re-located to Doukkala North of the Oum Er-Rbia River.

At the end of the French protectorate (ca 1950), there lived in Doukkala 372,269 Muslims, 2,680 Europeans and 3,933 Jews. Hart estimated the population of the Doukkala tribal confederation to be 360,000 in 1960.

== Geography ==
Doukkala is divided in three sub-regions, parallel to the seacoast.

- The "Oulja" (Arabic: الولـجة), along the beach, with garden-crops.
- The "Sahel" (Arabic: الساحل), some 20 km inside, a stony region, only suiting to sheep breeding.
- The rich plain, with wheat, sugar beets, and intensive cattle breeding.

The only mountain to be seen is at the border with the plain of Rahamna called "Jbel Lakhdar" (Arabic: جبل لخضر) meaning "Green Mountain".

The plain is subject to flooding. A temporary natural lake between Sidi Bennour and Oulad Amrane called "Ouarar" (Arabic: ورار) only fills in rainy years. Its largest surface was noted in 1916, 1966 and 2008.

== Gallery ==
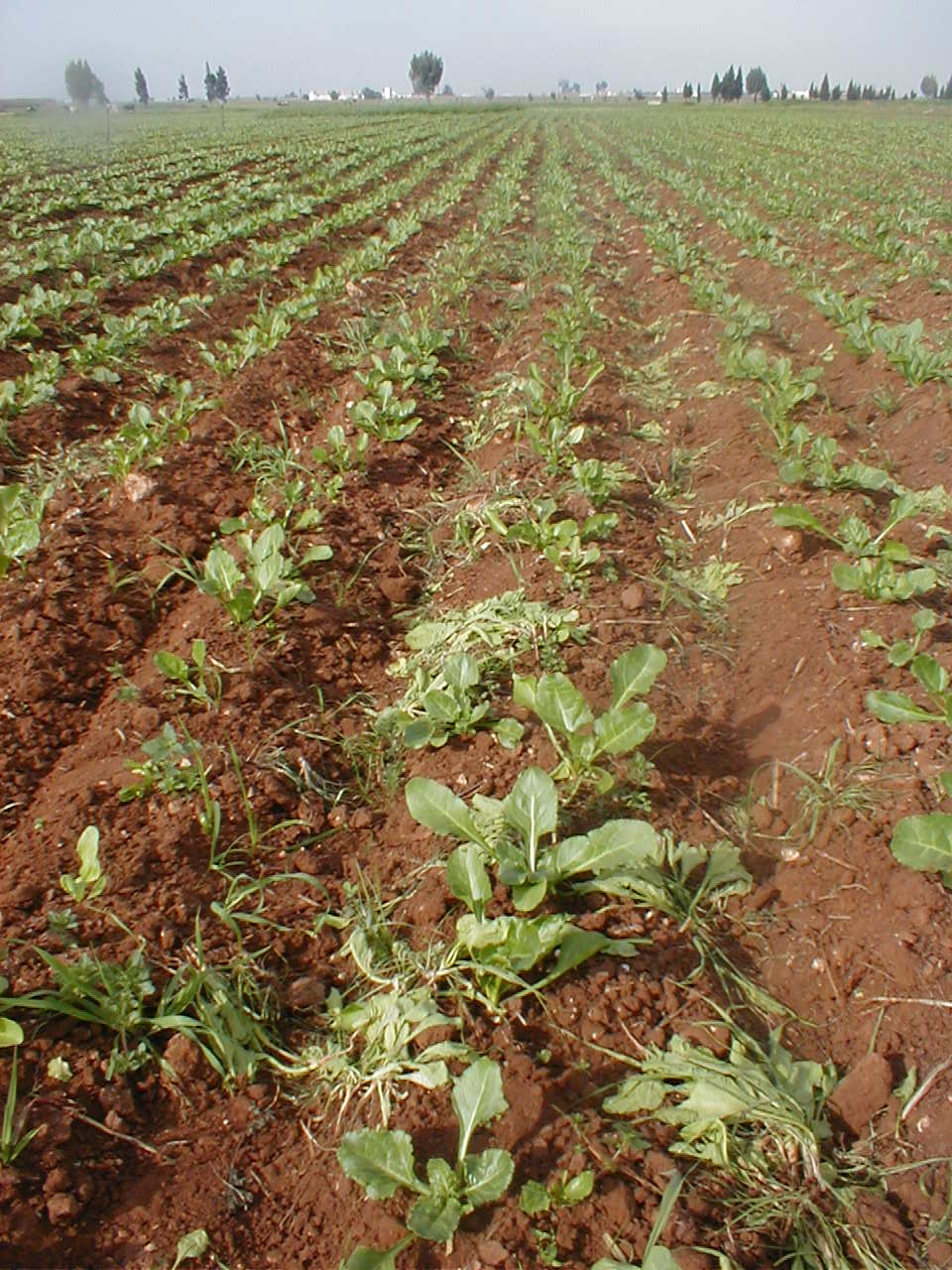
Sugar beets cultivation at Sidi Smail

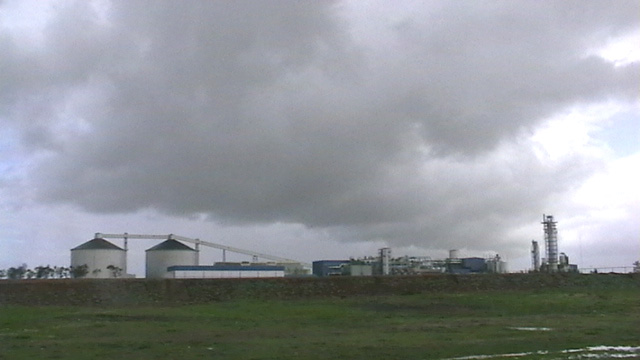
Sugar factory at Sidi Bennour

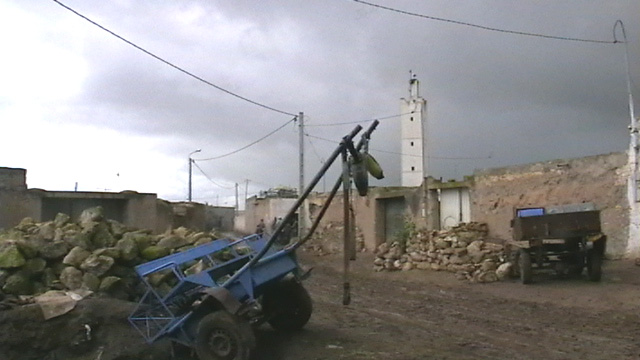
Center of a typical Doukkala village (Mwarid, Oulad Bou Hmam)

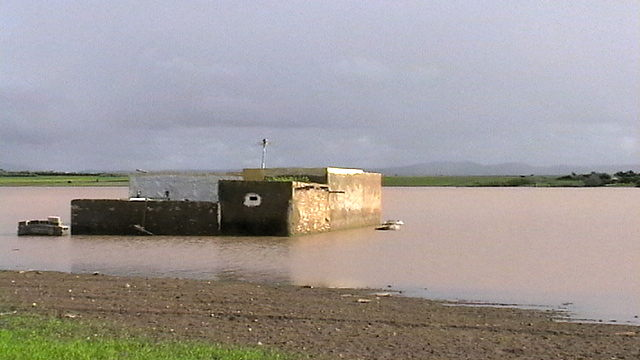
Warar, a natural temporary lake, in 2008, flooding a house built in the 1970s

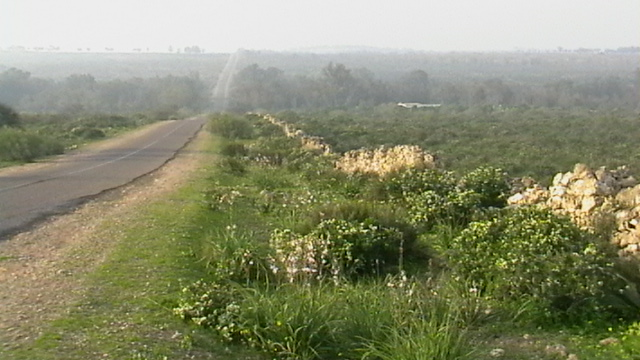
"Sahel" sub-region, with "anticline climbing" road

== Sources ==
- Cornell, Vincent J. (1990). "Socioeconomic Dimensions of Reconquista and Jihad in Morocco: Portuguese Dukkala and the Sadid Sus, 1450-1557". International Journal of Middle East Studies. 22 (4): 379–418. ISSN 0020-7438.
