= Sidi Bennour Province =

Coordinates: 32.3900°N 8.2600°W

Sidi Bennour Province إقليم سيدي بنور ⵜⴰⵙⴳⴰ ⵏ ⵙⵉⴷⵉ ⴱⵏⵏⵓⵔ
- Province
- Eucalyptus forest with Jbel Lakhdar seen in the distance
- Interactive map of Sidi Bennour Province
- Country: Morocco
- Region: Casablanca-Settat
- Capital: Sidi Bennour

Area
  - Total: 3,007 km^{2} (1,161 sq mi)

Population (2014)
  - Total: 451,930

Sidi Bennour (Arabic: إقليم سيدي بنور; Standard Moroccan Tamazight: ⵜⴰⵙⴳⴰ ⵏ ⵙⵉⴷⵉ ⴱⵏⵏⵓⵔ) is a Province on the western coast of the Morocco.

It was named after Abu Yenour Abd Allah Iben ouchris Al-Doukkali, a Sufi jurist who was a contemporary of the Almoravid state.

The province was created in 2009 by separating it from neighboring provinces and belongs to the Casablanca-Settat region. It is bordered by the Atlantic Ocean to the west, El Jadida Province to the north, Safi Province to the southwest, Rehamna and Youssoufia Provinces to the southeast, and Settat Province and the Oum Er-Rbia River to the northeast.

Its capital, namesake and largest city is Sidi Bennour. Oualidia is a major coastal resort town.

The province has an area of 3,007 km^{2}, and a population of 451,930 as of the 2024 census.

It is a center for sugar beet production in the region. The province is known for its diverse weekly markets throughout the week, including Tnine Chtouka, Tlat Sidi Bennour, Khmis Ksiba, Larbaâ Laaounate, Khmis Zemamra, jamaa Bni Hilal, and Sebt Saiss.

== Name ==
The name of the region goes back to the personality of Abu Yenour Abd Allah Iben ouchris Al-Doukkali, a Sufi jurist who was a contemporary of the Almoravid state.

== Population ==
According to the 2014 statistics, the population of the region was 452,538 people, ranking thirty-fifth in terms of population, with a population density of 150.4 per square kilometer. The number of males among them was 229,023 people, representing 50.61 percent, while the number of females was 223,425 people, representing 49.39 percent. The number of foreigners among them was 90 people.

== Administrative divisions ==
The territorial administration of the region consists of two pashas and two districts with 9 leaderships, two urban groups ( municipalities ) and 23 rural groups.

=== Municipalities ===
- Municipality Sidi Bennour
- Municipality Zemamra

=== Circles ===
- Constituency Sidi Bennour
- Constituency Zemamra

=== Rural groups ===
Sidi Bennour Constituency :

- Bni Hilal
- Bni Tsiriss
- Bouhmame
- Jabria
- Khmis Ksiba
- Koudiat Bni Dghough
- Kridid
- Laagagcha
- Laamria
- Laaounate
- Laatatra
- Lmechrek
- Metrane
- M'Tal
- Oulad Amrane
- Oulad Boussaken
- Oulad Si Bouhya
- Tamda

Zemamra Constituency :

- Laghnadra
- Lgharbia
- Oualidia
- Oulad Sbaita
- Saniat Berguig

== Landmarks ==
The most important landmarks of the region are the Dome of Sidi Bennour, the Dome of Sidi Boussaken, the Kasbah of Oualidia, the Kasbah Boulaouane, the Kasbah Khmis Ksiba, and a type of heritage building called Tazota.

It also contains huge natural landscapes such as the Oualidia Beach, Ain El Ghar Forest, Bouhmame Forest, Oulad Boussaken Forest, and Jbel Lakhdar, in addition to the shrines located in the region, including the shrine of Abu Yenour Al-Doukkali, the shrine of Abu Hafs Omar bin Ali Al-Daghoghi, the shrine of Abdul Aziz bin Yafo, and others.

== Influential people ==
Among the most famous artistic figures are the musician and singer Fatna Bent Lhoucine and the singer Abdelaziz Stati.

== Sports ==
Among the most famous sports clubs in the Sidi Bennour region are Fath Sidi Bennour Club in the city of Sidi Bennour, Amal Sidi Bennour Club in the city of Sidi Bennour as well, and RCA Zemamra in the city of Zemamra.

== Oyster Farming ==
The 50s of the last century were the beginning of oyster farming in the city, specifically in 1954 at the hands of the Frenchman "Banclos Al-Bashir", who converted to Islam, settled in Morocco, and established "The Pond" or the seventh station as the first station for oyster farming in the city.

Banclo tried to farm oysters in the Oualidia Lagoon, after seeing the potential and suitable environment similar to the famous French stations for farming oysters.

The nature of the formation of the Oualidia Lagoon, as a narrow waterway similar to a river separated from the sea by sand dunes, and the course of this "river" which is parallel to the ocean and its waters meet at high tide, has turned it into a suitable environment for the growth and reproduction of this type of shellfish. Banclo imported baby oysters from Japan, and planted them in the Oualidia Lagoon.

The young Japanese oysters quickly adapted to the Oualidia waters, began to feed on plankton, and lived to transform into oysters of different sizes. This led to transforming Oualidia into the capital of oyster production in Morocco, and many French and Moroccans alike settled in the region to produce Oualidia oysters, which are distinguished by their special taste.

== Geography ==
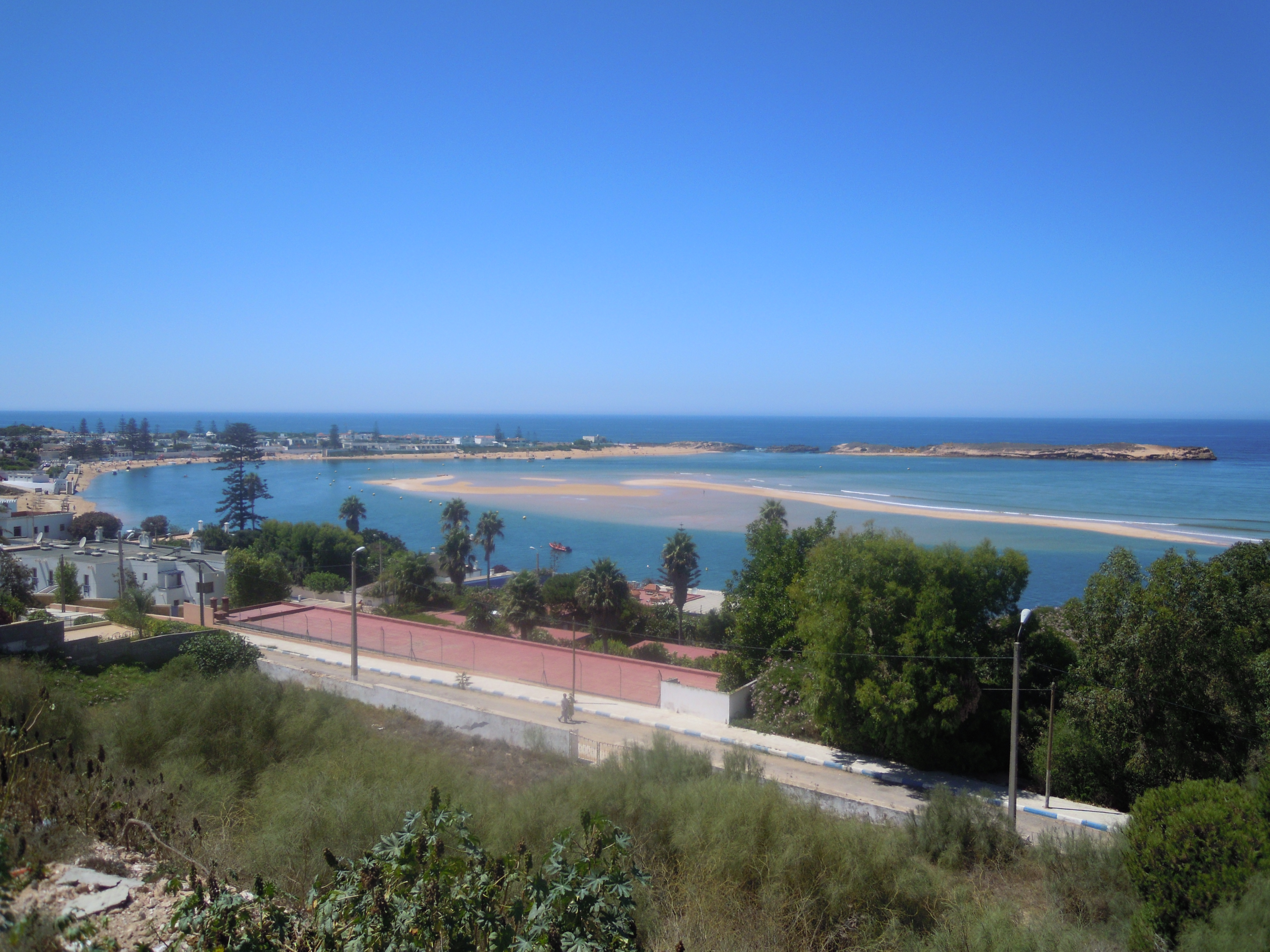
Oualidia Beach

Sidi Bennour province is bordered to the east by El Jadida province, to the west by the Atlantic Ocean, to the north by Settat province, and to the south by Safi province. The province consists of 23 Communes, and the total area is 300,733 km2, making it the thirty-fifth largest in terms of population.

The Sidi Bennour region contains several forests, the most important of which are Ain El Ghar Forest, Bouhmame Forest, and Oulad Boussaken Forest. It is also distinguished by the presence of the last elevation of the Atlas Mountains called the Jbel Lakhdar. The region also extends along a 30 km coastal strip on the Atlantic Ocean.

The capital of the region is Sidi Bennour, with a population of 55,815 people. The city of Oualidia has a population of 18,616 people. Another large city is Zemamra, which is close to the commune of Laghnadra.

=== Economy ===
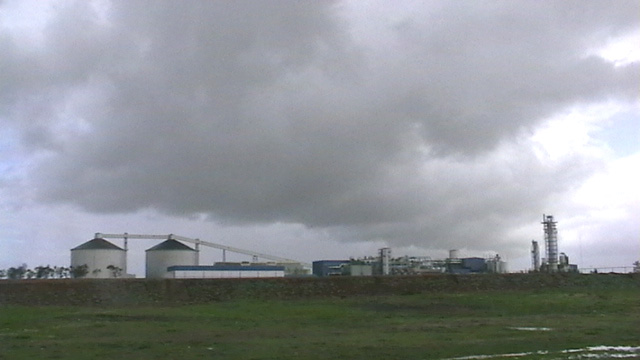
Cosumar sugar factory in Sidi Bennour

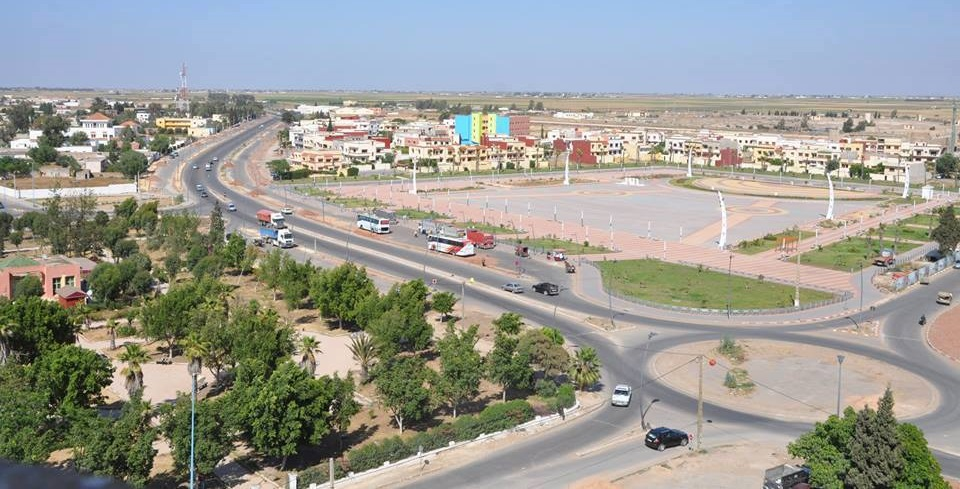
One of the most important cities in the province is Zemamra.

The 'Doukkala sugar factory', a unit of the Cosumar group located in Sidi Bennour, is an important for the economy of the province.

The city of Zemamra has natural potential in terms of agriculture and livestock breeding. It has the best soil in Morocco, the 'Tirs' soil, which is exploited throughout the seasons. It is a producer of meat and wheat. It also has an important market called the Souk Khmis Zemmama.

The main resources of Oualidia are oysters, as well as fishing, tourism and agriculture. Oualidia has one of the best protected beaches on the North Atlantic coast, which gives it a tourist attraction. Oualidia is the first oyster farming point in Morocco, and therefore it is advanced in this field.

== Higher lerning ==
EST Sidi Bennour is a technology school in the city of Sidi Bennour and was established in 2016. It has about 13,175 students. It is part of Chouaib Doukkali University.
