= Road signs in Morocco =

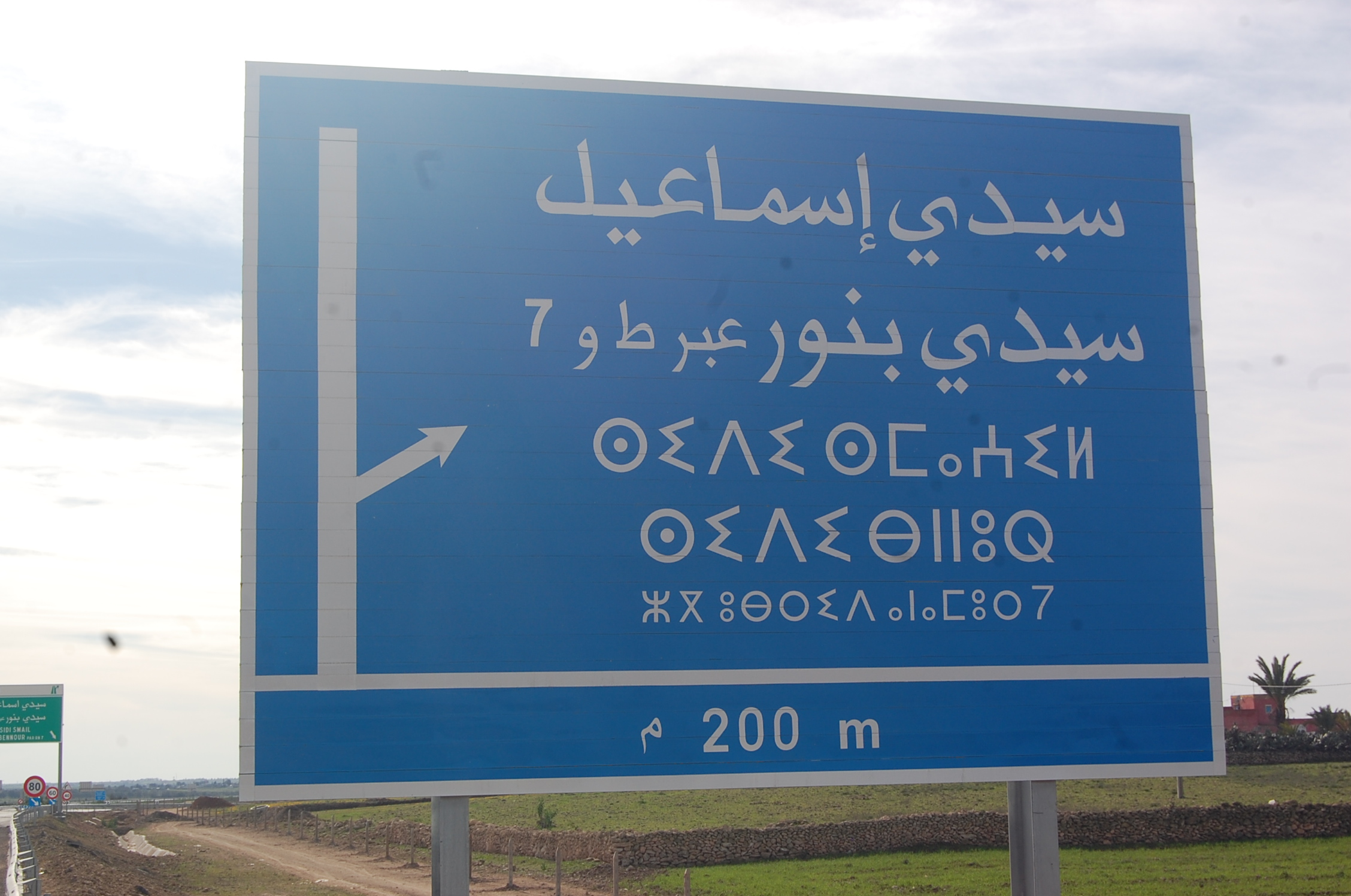
A motorway exit sign in Arabic and Tamazight. The signposted destinations are Sidi Smail and Sidi Bennour.

Road signs in Morocco are regulated under a joint decree by the Ministry of Equipment, Transport and Logistics and the Ministry of Interior, published in the Official Bulletin of the Kingdom of Morocco. A further joint decree in 2019 strengthened the legal system in relation to road signs. They are also laid out in the General Instruction on Road Signage (IGSR, French: Instruction générale sur la signalisation routière). They are broadly similar to those formerly and currently used in France, and are compliant with the Vienna Convention on Road Signs and Signals, to which Morocco acceded on 29 December 1982.

== Design ==
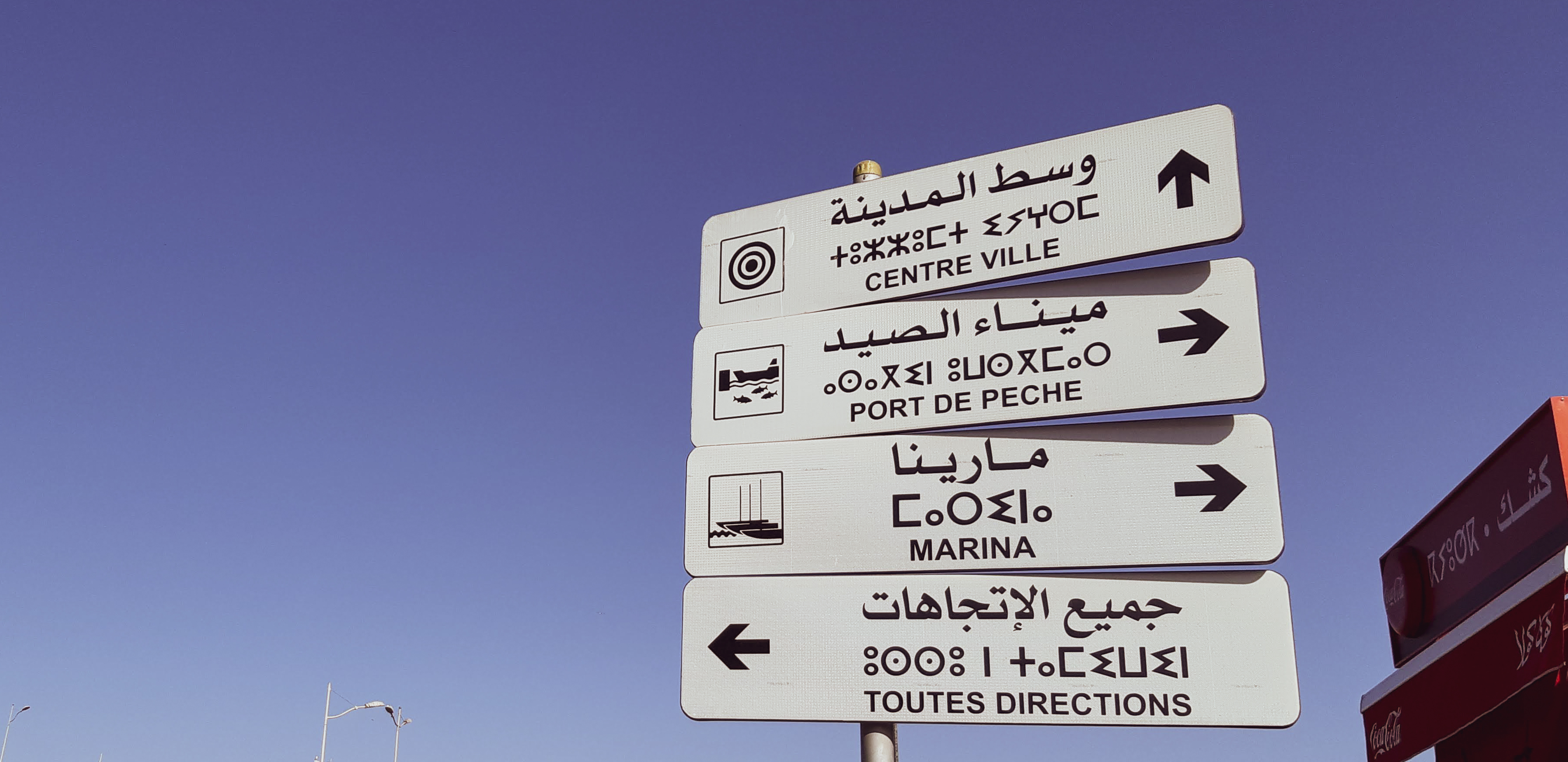
Trilingual road signs in Agadir.

Directional signage bears some similarity to pre-1977 French signage. Other signage, such as warning and regulatory, is quite similar to those used in France today, particularly the symbols used on these signs.

In 2019, following the joint decree, the colour of symbols and text on white backgrounds was changed from dark blue to black, following the practice of that in Europe and the rest of the Maghreb.

Road signs in Morocco generally appear in Arabic and French, and are generally bilingual. Tamazight is also used, particularly on motorway signage. Bilingual signs in Arabic and Tamazight began being installed on motorways in 2015, where it replaced French. In some cases signs containing all three languages can be seen.

Arabic text uses the ASV Codar typeface, Latin text uses the Caractères typeface and Tifinagh text uses the Tifinaghe-Izuren IRCAM typeface.

== Additional panels ==
Category panels

80.01
Refers to vehicles or combinations of vehicles with a maximum GVW or maximum authorised rolling weight of less than 3.5 tonnes.

80.02
Public transport vehicles

80.03
Motorcycles and mopeds (>50cc)

80.04
All vehicles carrying goods

80.05
Vehicles carrying goods with a GVW and permissible total rolling weight exceeding the number indicated

80.06
Agricultural motor vehicles

80.07
Cycles

80.08
Pedestrians

80.09
Hand carts

80.10
Animal drawn vehicles

80.11
Vehicles with a GVW which exceeds the number indicated

80.12
Vehicles with a width greater than the number indicated

80.13
Vehicles with a height greater than the number indicated

80.14
Vehicles with a length greater than the number indicated

80.15
Vehicles weighing more than the specified number per axle

80.16
Vehicles carrying more than a certain quantity of flammable or explosive material and marked as such

80.17
Vehicles carrying more than a certain quantity of material likely to pollute water and marked as such

80.18
Vehicles equipped with snow chains

80.19
Facilities for the physically disabled

80.20
Vehicles towing a caravan or trailer weighing more than 250 kg and whose total rolling weight, vehicle plus trailer, does not exceed 3.5 tonnes

80.21
Mopeds (<50cc)

80.22
Vehicles carrying dangerous goods
Additional panels for parking and stopping signs

81.01
Indicates that parking is unilateral and alternates on a semi-monthly basis

81.03
Gives details of the prohibition

81.04
Concerns paid parking without a parking meter

81.05
Indicates that parking is paid with a parking meter

81.06
Indicates that parking is reserved for vehicles used by the physically disabled with reduced mobility

81.08
Indicates that parking and/or stopping causes an obstruction. It complements the 328.1 and 328.2 signs. The vehicle may be impounded.
Distance panels and length panels

Distance panel 82
Indicates the length of the section between the sign and the start of the dangerous passage or the zone to which the regulations apply or the point which is the subject of the indication

Length panel 83
Indicates the length of the section that is dangerous or subject to regulation or covered by the indication
Stop and priority panels

Stop panel 84.01
Indicates the distance between the sign and the point where the driver must stop and give way

Give way panel 84.02
Indicates to the driver to give way
Position or direction panels

85.01
Indicates the position of the lane affected by the sign it accompanies

85.02
Indicates the direction to follow, and where applicable the distance, to reach the service indicated by the sign

85.03
Indicates that the sign it accompanies relates to the lane above which it is placed
Panels to enforce parking and stopping regulations (signs indicating that parking and stopping restrictions apply)

86.01
Indicates that the section to which the requirement applies extends after the sign (this is the beginning of the section)

86.02
Indicates that the section to which the requirement applies extends before the sign (this is the end of the section)

86.03
Indicates that the section to which the requirement applies extends on either side of the sign (this is a reminder)

86.04
Indicates that the section to which the regulation applies extends in the direction(s) indicated by the arrow(s)

86.05
Indicates that the section to which the regulation applies extends in the direction(s) indicated by the arrow(s)

86.06
Indicates that the section to which the regulation applies extends in the direction(s) indicated by the arrow(s)

Panels with various indications

87.01
Provides various indications (in writing form)

87.07
Indicates that the emergency stop location is equipped with an emergency call station

87.08
Indicates that the emergency stop location is equipped with an emergency call station and a fire extinguisher

87.09
Indicates that the sign with which it is associated relates to an air danger area

87.10
Indicates that the pedestrian crossing is raised

87.11
Indicates the risk of colliding with slow vehicles on a descent

87.12
Indicates the risk of colliding with slow vehicles on an ascent
Scheme panels

88
A diagram shows the approaching intersection and a broad line indicates the priority branches.

== Warning signs ==
101.1
Curve to right

101.2
Curve to left

101.3
Succession of curves, first to right

101.4
Succession of curves, first to left

102.1
Dangerous descent

102.2.
Steep ascent

103.1
Road narrows

103.2
Road narrows on right

103.3
Road narrows on left

104
Narrow bridge

105
Opening bridge

106
Quayside or river bank

107.1
Potholes or speed bumps

107.2
Speed hump

108
Slippery surface

109
Submersible surface

110
Loose chippings

111
Risk of rockfall

112
Pedestrian crossing

113
Place frequented by children

114
Cyclists or mopeds

115.1
Domestic animals crossing (cows)

115.2
Domestic animals crossing (sheep)

115.3
Domestic animals crossing (camels)

116
Wild animals crossing

117
Horseriders crossing

118
Traffic lights ahead

119
Crossing an air danger zone

120
Sidewinds

121
Two-way traffic

122
Other dangers

123
Level crossing with manually operated barriers for passing trains

124
Level crossing without barriers or half barriers

125
Tramway track crossing

126
Farm machinery crossing

127
Animal-drawn vehicles crossing

== Intersection and priority signs ==
201
Stop (Arabic)

201
Stop (Latin)

202.1
Yield

202.2
Yield ahead

202.3
Stop ahead

203
Intersection of roads to which the general priority to the right rule applies

204
Intersection of a priority road with a minor road

205
Roundabout

206
Priority road

207
End of priority road

== Regulatory signs ==
=== Prohibition signs ===
301
No entry

302
No motor vehicles

303.1
No motor vehicles except motorcycles and mopeds

303.2
No public transport vehicles

304
No bicycles

305
No mopeds

306
No motorcycles

307
No goods vehicles

308
No pedestrians

309
No animal-drawn vehicles

310
No handcarts

311
No farm vehicles

312
No motor vehicles except mopeds

313
No vehicles transporting explosive or inflammable materials

314.1
No vehicles carrying water pollutants

314.2
No vehicles carrying dangerous goods

315
Width limit

316
Height limit

317
Weight limit

318
Axle weight limit

319
Length limit

320
Minimum distance between vehicles

321.1
No left turn

321.2
No right turn

321.3
No U-turn

322.1
No overtaking

322.2
No overtaking by heavy goods vehicles

322.3
Give way to oncoming vehicles

323
Speed limit

324
No honking

325.1
Stop - customs

325.2
Stop - police

325.3
Stop - gendarmerie

325.4
Stop - traffic control

326
Stop - snow barrier

327
Stop - toll

328.1
No parking

328.2
No stopping

328.3
Half-monthly parking

328.4
Half monthly parking

329
No motor vehicles

330
No vehicles pulling caravans

331
Other restrictions (example: closed to cattle)

=== End of prohibition signs ===
333
End of all previously signed restrictions

334
End of speed limit

329
End of no overtaking

329
End of no overtaking by heavy goods vehicles

329
End of no honking

329
End of any other restrictions (example: End of prohibition to skiers)

=== Mandatory signs ===
340.1
Turn right

340.2
Turn left

341.1
Keep left

342.2
Keep right

342
Ahead only

343.1
Turn right ahead

343.2
Turn left ahead

344.1
Go straight or turn right

344.2
Go ahead or turn left

345
Turn left or right

346
Roundabout

347
Cycle track

348
Animal-drawn vehicle track

349
Handcart track

350
Animal track

351
Horse-riding path

352
Keep to the right (multi-lane road)

353
Pedestrian path

354
Minimum speed limit

356
Public transport vehicles lane

357
Snow chains mandatory

358
Headlights mandatory

359.1
Tram lane

359.2
Slow vehicle lane

=== End of mandatory signs ===
360
End of minimum speed limit

361
End of cycle track

362
End of pedestrian path

363
End of horse-riding path

364
End of public transport vehicle lane

365
End of mandatory snow chains

366
End of mandatory headlights

367
End of tram lane

368
End of slow vehicle lane

=== Zoning and end of zoning signs ===
370.1
No parking zone

370.2
Semi-monthly alternating one-sided parking zone

370.3
Time-limited parking zone with disc control

370.4
Paid parking zone

370.5
Semi-monthly alternating one-sided parking zone with disc control

371
30 km/h speed limit zone

372.1
End of no parking zone

372.2
End of semi-monthly alternating one-sided parking zone

372.3
End of time-limited parking zone with disc control

372.4
End of paid parking zone

372.5
End of semi-monthly alternating one-sided parking zone with disc control

373
End of 30 km/h speed limit zone

== Informatory signs ==
=== Indication signs ===
401.1
Parking

401.2
Paid parking

401.3
Disc parking

401.4
Electric vehicle parking

401.5
Electric vehicle charging point

401.6
Park and ride (bus)

401.7
Park and ride (tram)

401.8
Park and ride (train)

402
Hospital/medical centre

403
Risk of fire

404
Taxi rank

405
Pedestrian crossing

406
One-way street

407
End of overtaking lane

408
Start of overtaking lane

408
Overtaking lane

409.1
Speed limits for specific lanes

409.1

409.2

409.3

410.1

410.2

411
Level crossing with gates on side road

412.1
Escape lane

412.2
Escape lane

413
Dead end

414
Dead end to the right

415
Road hump

416
Cycle path

417
End of cycle path

418
Motorway

419
End of motorway

420
Toll ticket collection point

421
Manned tollbooth

422
Toll payment by debit card

423.1
Toll payment by credit card

423.2
Electronic toll payment (Jawaz)

424
Toll payment with cash

425
Tram crossing

426
Restricted parking for caravans

427
Pedestrian zone

428
End of pedestrian zone

429
Priority over oncoming vehicles

430
Lanes merge (two to one)

430
Lanes merge (three to two)

430
Lanes merge (four to three)

431
Tunnel

432
End of tunnel

433
Other indications (example: parking permitted on sidewalk)

434
Lane reserved for pedestrians and non-motorised vehicles

435
End of lane reserved for pedestrians and non-motorised vehicles

436
Bus stop

437
Tram stop

438
Emergency bay

=== Service signs ===
440
First aid station

442
Other services (example: regional products)

443
Quick repair workshop (open 24/7)

444
Phone box

444.1
Emergency phone

445
Fuel

446
Hotel or motel

447
Restaurant

448
Café

449
Picnic area

450
Access to walking route

451.1
Campsite

451.2
Caravan site

451.3
Camping and caravan site

451.4
Youth hostel

451.5
Self-catering accommodation

452
Service or tourist information

453
Access to cross-country ski circuit outside a winter sports resort

454
Public toilets

455
Services accessible to the disabled

456
Caravan draining point

457
Cable car

458
Ferry pier/quay

459
Place to launch light watercraft

460
Play area

461
Tyre inflator pump

462
Recreation area

463
Viewpoint

464
Fire extinguisher

465.1
Emergency exit

465.2
Emergency exit

470
Toll road section

471
Toll plaza

472
Toll

=== Information and road safety signs ===
480
Road safety message (example: for your safety, put on your seatbelt)

481.1
Keep safe distance between vehicles

481.2

481.3

== Temporary signs ==
900
Potholes

901
Road narrows

901.1
Road narrows on right

901.2
Road narrows on left

902
Slippery surface

903
Roadworks

904
Other danger

905
Traffic lights

906
Loose chippings

907
Accident

908
Queue

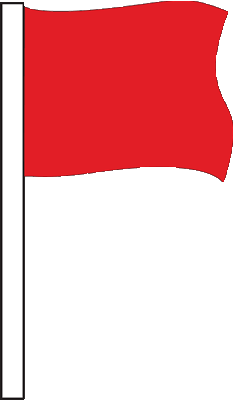
910
Red flag – used to indicate a temporary obstacle of minor importance

911
End of roadworks

== See also ==
- Transport in Morocco
