= Doukkali =

Doukkali (also transliterated as ad-Dukkali; Arabic: الدكالي) is a Moroccan surname. Notable people with the surname include:

- Abdelwahab Doukkali (1941–2026), Moroccan composer and performer
- Abu Shu'ayb ad-Dukkali (1878–1937), Moroccan scholar, minister and educator
- Anas Doukkali (born 1973), Moroccan politician
- Mohamed Faraj Doukkali (1937–2021), Moroccan diplomat
- Noufissa Doukkali (born 1955), Moroccan actress
- Hassan Doukkali (born 2002), Moroccan judoka

== See also ==
- Chouaib Doukkali University, in El Jadida, Morocco
