= Deroua =

Deroua: الدروة (Arabic); ⴷⴷⵔⵡⴰ (Berber languages)
- Town
- Location within Morocco
- Coordinates: 33°25′N 7°32′W
- Country: Morocco
- Region: Casablanca-Settat
- Province: Berrechid

Population (2014)
  - Total: 47,719
- Time zone: UTC+0 (GMT)

Deroua (Arabic: الدروة, romanized: ad-darwa; Berber languages: ⴷⴷⵔⵡⴰ, romanized: ddrwa) is a town in Berrechid Province, Casablanca-Settat, Morocco. It lies to the south of Casablanca, just to the northeast of Mohamed V International Airport. According to the 2014 Moroccan census it recorded a population of 47,719, up from 10,373 in the 2004 census.

== Climate ==
Deroua has a hot-summer Mediterranean climate (Köppen climate classification Csa).

Climate data for Derroua
| Month | Jan | Feb | Mar | Apr | May | Jun | Jul | Aug | Sep | Oct | Nov | Dec | Year |
|---|---|---|---|---|---|---|---|---|---|---|---|---|---|
| Mean daily maximum °C (°F) | 16 (60) | 17 (62) | 19 (66) | 20 (68) | 24 (75) | 25 (77) | 28 (82) | 29 (84) | 27 (80) | 24 (75) | 20 (68) | 17 (62) | 22 (71) |
| Mean daily minimum °C (°F) | 6 (42) | 7 (44) | 8 (46) | 9 (48) | 13 (55) | 15 (59) | 17 (62) | 18 (64) | 16 (60) | 13 (55) | 10 (50) | 7 (44) | 11 (51) |
| Average precipitation mm (inches) | 61 (2.4) | 51 (2) | 64 (2.5) | 23 (0.9) | 23 (0.9) | 2.5 (0.1) | 0 (0) | 2.5 (0.1) | 10 (0.4) | 28 (1.1) | 53 (2.1) | 76 (3) | 400 (15.7) |
Source: Weatherbase
