= Laaounate =

- Rural commune and town
- Location within Morocco
- Coordinates: 32.7446°N 8.1942°W
- Country: Morocco
- Region: Casablanca-Settat
- Province: Sidi Bennour

Population (2016)
  - Total: 13,793
- Time zone: UTC+0 (GMT)

Laaounate is a small town and rural commune in Sidi Bennour Province of the Casablanca-Settat region of Morocco. At the time of the 2004 census, the commune had a total population of 18,258 people living in 3188 households.

== Notable people ==
- Abdelaziz Stati, Moroccan Chaabi singer
- Hicham Aboucherouane, Former international footballer
