= Abu Shu'ayb ad-Dukkali =

Moroccan scholar

Abū Shu'ayb ad-Dukkālī as-Sadīqī (Arabic: أبو شعيب الدكالي الصديقي; 1878–1937) was a Moroccan scholar, minister, educator, and pioneer of Salafism in Morocco. He was referred to by the title Shaykh al-Islām.

== Biography ==
He was born in 1878 to a modest family from a rural area called as-Sadiqat (دوار الصديقات) near al-Gharbiya in Dukkala. His family was affiliated with the Darqawi Sufi order and studied Ibn Ata Allah al-Iskandari's Al-Ḥikam al-Aṭāʾiya.

He studied at Al-Azhar University in Cairo and lectured at Al-Azhar and at az-Zaytuna in Tunis.

Among his students were Muhammad al-Mukhtar as-Susi and Mohammed Belarbi Alaoui. He headed the program of study in the royal palace under Sultans Abd al-Hafid, Yusuf, and Muhammad V.

He was among a number of Moroccan scholars—including Allal al-Fassi, Muhammad al-Mukhtar as-Susi, and Muhammad Bin al-Arabi al-Alaoui—that led a nationalist, reformist Salafi movement that was intellectually affiliated with the Moroccan Nationalist Movement opposed to French colonialism.

== Legacy ==
Chouaib Doukkali University in al-Jadida bears his name.
