= Oulad Sbaita =

Oulad Sbaita أولاد سبيطة
- Rural commune and town
- Location within Morocco
- Coordinates: 32.6320°N 8.8456°W
- Country: Morocco
- Region: Casablanca-Settat
- Province: Sidi Bennour

Population (2004)
  - Total: 24,967
- Time zone: UTC+0 (GMT)

Oulad Sbaita is a small town and rural commune in Sidi Bennour Province of the Casablanca-Settat region of Morocco. At the time of the 2004 census, the commune had a total population of 24,967 people living in 3872 households.
