= Mubarak Rabi =

Moroccan novelist and short-story writer (born 1940)

Mubarak Rabi, also spelled M'Barek Rabi (Arabic: مبارك ربيع; born in 1938 in Ben Maachou, near Casablanca) is a Moroccan novelist, short-story writer and psychologist.

== Early life ==
He was the dean of the Faculty of Letters and Humanities Ben M'Sik in Casablanca for several years. Rabi's novels give an unexpected insight in the social realities of urban and rural life of Morocco and in the role of magic and traditional beliefs.

== Career ==
Mubarak Rabi wrote several collections of short stories:Sayyidna Qadr (trl. Our Master Fate, 1969), Dar wa Dukhkhan (trl. A house and Smoke, 1975) and Rih'alat Al-H'asad wa Al-H'ubb, (trl. Journey of Harvest and Love, 1983). Some of his novels are: Attayyibun, (trl. The Good-Hearted, 1972), Rufqata Assilah'i wa Lqamar (trl. In the company of weapons and the Moon, 1976) and Arrih' Ashshatwiyya (trl. The Winter Wind, 1977). It is especially with his later books that he won a great public acclaim. These books are: the novel Badr Zamanihi (trl. The Moon of his Times, 1983), Burju Assua'ud (trl. Tower of Fortunes, 1990), the trilogy Derb Sultan (called after Derb sultane, an old quartier of Casablanca, 1999), the collection of short stories, al-Balluri al-maksur (trl. The broken crystalline, 1996), the short story collection Min Gharb lichark (trl. From West to East, 2002) and the novels Ayam jabilia (trl. Chronicle from the Mountains, 2003) and Ahl al-Bayad (trl. White People, 2011). Rabi also wrote more than twelve children's books.

Rabi studied and taught psychology. He published a collection of essays about children's psychology called Awatif al-Tifl (trl. The child's emotions, 1984).

== External sources ==
- Excerpt from Sayyidna Qadr, in English translation, Our Lord Fate, in Dalya Cohen-Mor, A Matter of Fate p. 41-48 (retrieved September 15, 2012)
- Menara, info site in Arabic, with photograph of the author (retrieved October 15, 2012)
