= Fokra Ouled Ameurs =

- Rural commune and town
- Location within Morocco
- Coordinates: 33.146°N 7.496°W
- Country: Morocco
- Region: Casablanca-Settat
- Province: Berrechid

Population (2014)
  - Total: 6,256
- Time zone: UTC+0 (GMT)

Fokra Ouled Ameurs is a small town and rural commune in Berrechid Province of the Casablanca-Settat region of Morocco. In the 2014 Moroccan census the commune recorded a population of 6,256 people living in 1,223 households. At the time of the 2004 census, the commune had a total population of 6,024 people living in 1,107 households.
