= Lahsasna =

- Rural commune and town
- Location within Morocco
- Coordinates: 33.189°N 7.684°W
- Country: Morocco
- Region: Casablanca-Settat
- Province: Berrechid

Population (2014)
  - Total: 9,315
- Time zone: UTC+0 (GMT)

Lahsasna is a small town and rural commune in Berrechid Province of the Casablanca-Settat region of Morocco. The 2014 Moroccan census recorded a population of 9315 people living in 1693 households in the commune. At the time of the 2004 census, the commune had a total population of 9495 people living in 1459 households.
