= Sidi El Mekki =

- Rural commune and town
- Location within Morocco
- Coordinates: 33.212°N 7.717°W
- Country: Morocco
- Region: Casablanca-Settat
- Province: Berrechid

Population (2014)
  - Total: 8,920
- Time zone: UTC+0 (GMT)

Sidi El Mekki is a small town and rural commune in Berrechid Province of the Casablanca-Settat region of Morocco. In the 2014 Moroccan census the commune recorded a population of 8920 people living in 1711 households. At the time of the 2004 census, the commune had a total population of 10,983 people living in 1793 households.
