= Sidi Abdelkhaleq =

- Rural commune and town
- Location within Morocco
- Coordinates: 33.070°N 7.998°W
- Country: Morocco
- Region: Casablanca-Settat
- Province: Berrechid

Population (2014)
  - Total: 6,122
- Time zone: UTC+0 (GMT)

Sidi Abdelkhaleq is a small town and rural commune in Berrechid Province of the Casablanca-Settat region of Morocco. In the 2014 Moroccan census the commune recorded a population of 6122 people living in 1007 households. At the time of the 2004 census, the commune had a total population of 5933 people living in 876 households.
