= Saniat Berguig =

- Rural commune and town
- Interactive map of Saniat Berguig
- Coordinates: 32.7140°N 8.6196°W
- Country: Morocco
- Region: Casablanca-Settat
- Province: Sidi Bennour

Population (2004)
  - Total: 30,286
- Time zone: UTC+0 (GMT)

Saniat Berguig is a small town and rural commune in Sidi Bennour Province of the Casablanca-Settat region of Morocco. At the time of the 2004 census, the commune had a total population of 30,286 people living in 4924 households.
