= Laamria =

- Rural commune and town
- Location within Morocco
- Coordinates: 32.8013°N 8.2330°W
- Country: Morocco
- Region: Casablanca-Settat
- Province: Sidi Bennour

Population (2004)
  - Total: 13,314
- Time zone: UTC+0 (GMT)

Laamria is a small town and rural commune in Sidi Bennour Province of the Casablanca-Settat region of Morocco. At the time of the 2004 census, the commune had a total population of 13,314 people living in 2105 households.
