= Tamda =

Tamda ⵜⴰⵎⴷⴰ
- Rural commune and town
- Location within Morocco
- Coordinates: 32.4409°N 8.3708°W
- Country: Morocco
- Region: Casablanca-Settat
- Province: Sidi Bennour

Population (2004)
  - Total: 9,701
- Time zone: UTC+0 (GMT)

Tamda (Berber languages: ⵜⴰⵎⴷⴰ) is a small town and rural commune in Sidi Bennour Province of the Casablanca-Settat region of Morocco. At the time of the 2004 census, the commune had a total population of 9701 people living in 1768 households.
