= Oulad Hriz Sahel =

- Location in Morocco
- Coordinates: 33°47′23″N 7°9′27″W
- Country: Morocco
- Region: Casablanca-Settat
- Province: Berrechid

Population (2014)
  - Total: 38,156
- Time zone: UTC+0 (GMT)

Oulad Hriz Sahel is a town and rural commune in the Casablanca-Settat region of Morocco. It is located 129 kilometers from Rabat and 40 kilometers from Casablanca.
