= Oulad Abbou =

Coordinates: 33°06′56″N 7°56′00″W

- Municipality
- Interactive map of Oulad Abbou
- Country: Morocco
- Region: Casablanca-Settat
- Province: Berrechid

Population (2014)
  - Total: 11,299
- Time zone: UTC+0 (GMT)

Oulad Abbou is a town in Berrechid Province, Casablanca-Settat, Morocco. According to the 2014 Moroccan census it recorded a population of 11,299, up from 10,748 in the 2004 census.
