= Ouled Cebbah =

Ouled Sabbah
- Rural commune and town
- Location within Morocco
- Coordinates: 33.279°N 7.323°W
- Country: Morocco
- Region: Casablanca-Settat
- Province: Berrechid

Population (2014)
  - Total: 7,606
- Time zone: UTC+0 (GMT)

The Ouled Sabbah mainly reside in Benslimane and their capital, El Gara, as well as in the regions of Doukkala, Abda, Chaouia, and Gharb. Traditional accounts trace their origins to the Banu Maqil through their ancestor, Sharif Abu Saad (Bousaad) al-Sabihi [1], who is said to descend from the Sebih, a branch of the Beni Malek tribe within the "Magharba" group (more accurately identified as the Zughba confederation). However, this Hilalian affiliation is often analyzed as a sociological integration (Lafif) rather than a genealogical one.

Today, they are identified as a primary fraction of the Mdakra tribe [2]. While the historical work Al-Istiqsa classifies them among the Riyah (Banu Hilal) via Banu Akhdar (Arabic: بنو الأخيضر), this categorization is considered purely administrative and geographic. Conversely, the historian Ibn Khaldun firmly links them to the Maqil Arabs. This view is supported by their historical affiliation with the Ouled Ali, a predominantly Maqilian tribe. The Ouled Sabbah are originally from the banks of the Moulouya River [3].

Historical Analysis This Maqilian identity is corroborated by local genealogical records that identify both the Ouled Sabbah and Ouled Ali as Jafarid Maqil (descendants of Ja'far ibn Abi Talib according to oral tradition). They claim kinship with the Banu Hassan, the noble and warrior branch of the confederation [4].

Critically, the name Akhdar is not of Hilalian origin. Historically, the Banu 'l-Ukhaidhir (Arabic: بنو الأخيضر) refers to a Sharifian (Alid) identity. Following the collapse of the Ukhaydirid State in Arabia, these families integrated into the Bedouin migrations for political survival.

Thus, It is historically more probable that their lineage trace back to Muhammed ibn Yusuf Al-Ukhaydir, known as "Amir Al-Akhdar." Their settlement on the Moulouya marked their definitive integration into the Maqil confederation, where they maintained their status as "Chouirfa" (nobles) while assuming leadership roles within the tribal alliances of Eastern Morocco and the Chaouia [5].

Tribal Structure Within the Mdakra tribe [3, 6], they belong to the Arab group known as Moualine Louta. Among their most famous historical leaders was Abdelkader ben Al-Hajj Al-Ma'ti Ould Al-Farjiya. Fractions of the Ouled Sabbah: Zbirat: Originally from Tadla. Factions: Rrzazka Ouled Mohamed, Moualine Chouiref, Chbanate. Ouled Atiya: Originally from Tadla. Ouled Faida: Originally from Tadla. Ouled Zidane: From Oued Zem/Ouardigha. Factions: Ouled Ssid, Ouled Lhrar, Ouled Qassem, Ouled Yahya, Ouled Mira. Ouled Qorra: From Ouardigha. Factions: Ouled Taher, Ouled Bouchaïb. Territory The Ouled Sabbah territory is located in the fertile Chaouia plain. Their lands are highly productive, and agriculture is well-developed. Because grazing land is limited locally, herds are sent during winter to neighboring tribes such as the Mediouna, Ahlaf, and Mellila [3]. Their capital, El Gara, is strategically located between Ouled Said to the east, Casablanca to the north, Settat to the south, and Benslimane to the east. Notable Families and Personalities Main families include [3]: Political/Military: The Ouled El-Fardjiya, 'Ali Bel-Arabi, El-Hadj Bel-Hadj, Hammou Bel-Hadj. Noble/Religious: The Ouled Chouirfa, Ouled Allai, Si Taibi El-Djabri, Ouled Mohammed Ben Slimane, Ouled Et-Tahmi, Ouled Retal, and the family of El-Ma’ti Ben Kellouk El-Faidi, Sabbahi. Religious Personalities (Sufi "Sidi"): The Ouled Sabbah are guardians of several Sufi shrines [7], including: Sidi Moussa ben Ayad, Sidi Ahmed ben Aliane, Sidi Mohamed Maj'ib. Al Sabahi Lineage: Sidi Massoud [Sabahi], Sidi Mhammed ben Abd'Allah [Sabahi], Sidi Mubarak [Sabahi]. Sidi al-Ghazwani, Sidi Boulghamen, Sidi Ben Nouar (Anwar), and Sidi Ahmed al-Taghi.
