= Lambarkiyine =

- Rural commune and town
- Location within Morocco
- Coordinates: 33°12′N 7°30′W
- Country: Morocco
- Region: Casablanca-Settat
- Province: Berrechid

Population (2014)
  - Total: 8,559
- Time zone: UTC+0 (GMT)

Lambarkiyine is a small town and rural commune in Berrechid Province of the Casablanca-Settat region of Morocco. In the 2014 Moroccan census the commune recorded a population of 8559 people living in 1604 households. At the time of the 2004 census, the commune had a total population of 7884 people living in 1324 households.
