= Laghnadra =

- Rural commune and town
- Location within Morocco
- Coordinates: 32.6161°N 8.6509°W
- Country: Morocco
- Region: Casablanca-Settat
- Province: Sidi Bennour

Population (2004)
  - Total: 32,091
- Time zone: UTC+0 (GMT)

Laghnadra is a small town and rural commune in Sidi Bennour Province of the Casablanca-Settat region of Morocco. At the time of the 2004 census, the commune had a total population of 32,091 people living in 5300 households.
