= Ouled Zidane =

Ouled Zidane أولاد زيدان
- Rural commune and town
- Location within Morocco
- Coordinates: 33.348°N 7.350°W
- Country: Morocco
- Region: Casablanca-Settat
- Province: Berrechid

Population (2014)
  - Total: 6,434
- Time zone: UTC+0 (GMT)

Ouled Zidane is a town and rural commune in Berrechid Province of the Casablanca-Settat region of Morocco. In the 2014 Moroccan census the commune recorded a population of 6,434 people living in 1,297 households. At the time of the 2004 census, the commune had a total population of 6,122 people living in 1,073 households.
