= Zaouiat Sidi Ben Hamdoun =

- Rural Commune and town
- Location within Morocco
- Coordinates: 33.045°N 7.929°W
- Country: Morocco
- Region: Casablanca-Settat
- Province: Berrechid

Population (2014)
  - Total: 9,521
- Time zone: UTC+0 (GMT)

Zaouiat Sidi Ben Hamdoun is a small town and rural commune in Berrechid Province of the Casablanca-Settat region of Morocco. In the 2014 Moroccan census the commune recorded a population of 9521 people living in 1836 households. At the time of the 2004 census, the commune had a total population of 10,039 people living in 1651 households.
