= Laagagcha =

Coordinates: 32°33′N 8°43′W

- Rural commune and town
- Interactive map of Laagagcha
- Country: Morocco
- Region: Casablanca-Settat
- Province: Sidi Bennour

Population (2004)
  - Total: 14,313
- Time zone: UTC+0 (GMT)

Laagagcha is a small town and rural commune in Sidi Bennour Province of the Casablanca-Settat region of Morocco. At the time of the 2004 census, the commune had a total population of 14,313 people living in 2441 households.
