= Al-Arbaoui =

Al-Arbaoui, El Arbaoui, or Larbaoui (Arabic: العرباوي) is a surname. Notable people with the surname include:

- Abdelaziz al-Arbaoui, Moroccan singer
- Adil El Arbaoui (born 1995), Moroccan cyclist
- Nadir Larbaoui, Algerian politician
