= Khmis Ksiba =

Khmis Ksiba خميس قصيبة
- Rural commune and town
- Location within Morocco
- Coordinates: 32.5181°N 8.2552°W
- Country: Morocco
- Region: Casablanca-Settat
- Province: Sidi Bennour

Population (2004)
  - Total: 6,637
- Time zone: UTC+0 (GMT)

Khmis Ksiba is a small town and rural commune in Sidi Bennour Province of the Casablanca-Settat region of Morocco. At the time of the 2004 census, the commune had a total population of 6637 people living in 1064 households.
