= Riyah, Morocco =

Riyah
- Rural commune and town
- Location within Morocco
- Coordinates: 33.154°N 7.385°W
- Country: Morocco
- Region: Casablanca-Settat
- Province: Berrechid

Population (2014)
  - Total: 8,373
- Time zone: UTC+0 (GMT)

Riyah is a small town and rural commune in Berrechid Province of the Casablanca-Settat region of Morocco. In the 2014 Moroccan census the commune recorded a population of 9373 people living in 1491 households. At the time of the 2004 census, the commune had a total population of 7562 people living in 1197 households.
