= Sahel Oulad H'Riz =

- Rural commune and town
- Location within Morocco
- Coordinates: 33.398°N 7.910°W
- Country: Morocco
- Region: Casablanca-Settat
- Province: Berrechid

Population (2014)
  - Total: 38,156
- Time zone: UTC+0 (GMT)

Sahel Oulad H'Riz is a small town and rural commune in Berrechid Province of the Casablanca-Settat region of Morocco. In the 2004 census, the commune had a total population of 26,435 people living in 4,654 households.In the 2014 Moroccan census, the commune recorded a population of 38,156 people living in 7,250 households.
