= Oulad Si Bouhya =

Oulad Si Bouhya أولاد سي بوحيى
- Rural commune and town
- Location within Morocco
- Coordinates: 32.7068°N 8.3137°W
- Country: Morocco
- Region: Casablanca-Settat
- Province: Sidi Bennour

Population (2004)
  - Total: 18,902
- Time zone: UTC+0 (GMT)

Oulad Si Bouhya is a small town and rural commune in Sidi Bennour Province of the Casablanca-Settat region of Morocco. At the time of the 2004 census, the commune had a total population of 18,902 people living in 3120 households.
