= Lakhyayta =

Coordinates: 33.3669°N 7.7761°W

- Village
- Interactive map of Lakhyayta
- Country: Morocco
- Region: Casablanca-Settat
- Province: Berrechid

Population (2004)
  - Total: 17,538
- Time zone: UTC+0 (GMT)

Lakhyayta is a village in Berrechid Province, Casablanca-Settat, Morocco. It was formerly also the name of a rural commune in Settat Province of the Chaouia-Ouardigha region. At the time of the 2004 census, the commune had a total population of 17,538 people living in 2956 households.
