= Jaqma =

- Rural commune and town
- Location within Morocco
- Coordinates: 33.292°N 7.440°W
- Country: Morocco
- Region: Casablanca-Settat
- Province: Berrechid

Population (2014)
  - Total: 10,306
- Time zone: UTC+0 (GMT)

Jaqma is a small town and rural commune in Berrechid Province of the Casablanca-Settat region of Morocco. In the 2014 Moroccan census, the commune recorded a population of 10,306 people living in 1850 households. At the time of the 2004 census, the commune had a total population of 11,511 people living in 1752 households.
