= Kasbat Ben Mchich =

Kasbat Ben Mchich قصبة بن مشيش
- Rural commune and town
- Location within Morocco
- Coordinates: 33.360°N 7.463°W
- Country: Morocco
- Region: Casablanca-Settat
- Province: Berrechid

Population (2014)
  - Total: 14,905
- Time zone: UTC+0 (GMT)

Kasbat Ben Mchich is a small town and rural commune in Berrechid Province of the Casablanca-Settat region of Morocco. In the 2014 Moroccan census the commune recorded a population of 14,905 people living in 2603 households. At the time of the 2004 census, the commune had a total population of 13,351 people living in 2078 households.
