= Sidi Rahal Chatai =

Sidi Rahel Chatai سيدي رحال الشاطئ Sidi Rahal Chatai
- Municipality
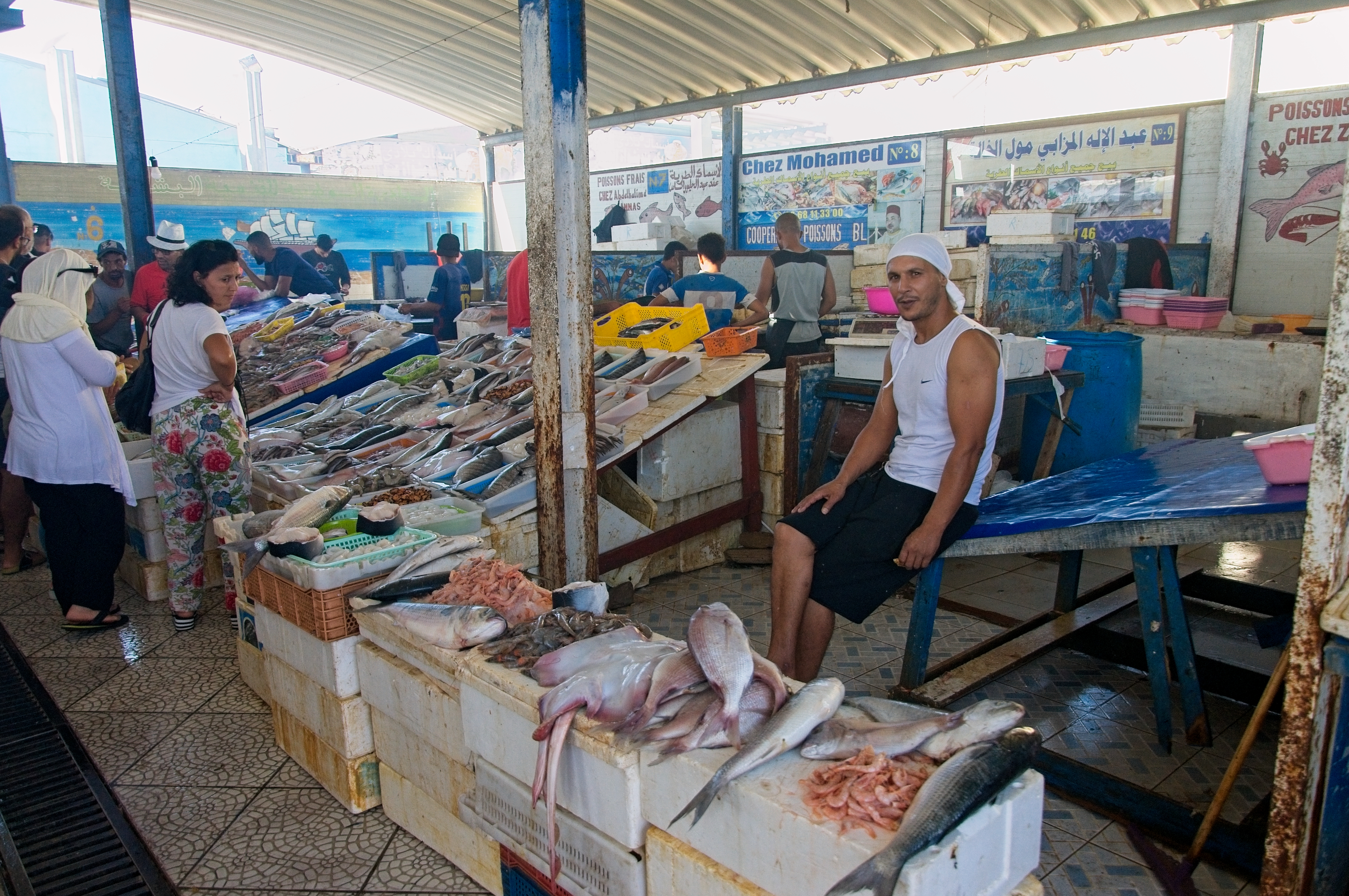
- A fishmonger at Sidi Rahal

- Location in Morocco
- Coordinates: 33°47′23″N 7°9′27″W
- Country: Morocco
- Region: Casablanca-Settat
- Province: Berrechid

Population (2014)
  - Total: 20,628
- Time zone: UTC+0 (GMT)

Sidi Rahal Chatai (Arabic: سيدي رحال الشاطئ) is a coastal town in the Casablanca-Settat region of Morocco. It is located 33 kilometers west of Casablanca. It recorded a population of 20,628 in the 2014 Moroccan census. It is a popular area for surfing especially in winter, as there is a consistent surf. It is a popular destination for Casablanca residents to spend their summer holidays.
