= Berrechid Province =

Coordinates: 32.268°N 7.581°W

Berrechid Province إقليم برشيد ⵜⴰⵙⴳⴰ ⵏ ⴱⵕⵕⵛⵉⴷ
- Province
- Interactive map of Berrechid Province
- Country: Morocco
- Region: Casablanca-Settat
- Capital: Berrechid

Area
  - Total: 2,530 km^{2} (980 sq mi)

Population (2024)
  - Total: 639,618

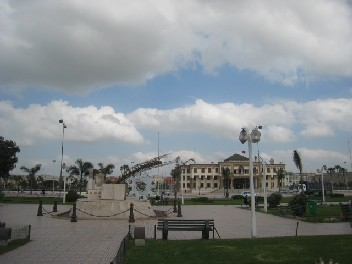
The monument to ears and gears in Berrechid, Morocco

Berrechid Province (Arabic: إقليم برشيد) is a province of Morocco in the Casablanca-Settat Region. The province had a population of 639,618 people in 2024.

== Administrative divisions ==
Name	Geographic code	Type	Households	Population (2004)	Foreign population	Moroccan population	Notes
Berrechid	461.01.03.	Municipality	18808	89830	106	89724	
Deroua	461.08.03.	Municipality	6738	36066	6	36060	
El Gara	461.01.07.	Municipality	3737	18070	1	18069	
Oulad Abbou	461.01.11.	Municipality	1966	10748	2	10746	
Sidi Rahal Chatai	461.05.31.	Municipality	4124	22426	15	22411	
Ben Maachou	461.05.01.	Rural commune	1546	8680	0	8680	
Laghnimyine	461.05.11.	Rural commune	2450	16191	0	16191	
Lahsasna	461.05.13.	Rural commune	1459	9495	2	9493	
Lakhiaita	461.05.15.	Rural commune	2956	17538	9	17529	
Sahel Oulad H'Riz	461.05.25.	Rural commune	4654	26435	6	26429	7149 residents live in the center, called Oulad H Riz Sahel; 19286 residents live in rural areas.
Sidi Abdelkhaleq	461.05.27.	Rural commune	876	5933	0	5933	
Sidi El Mekki	461.05.29.	Rural commune	1793	10983	9	10974	
Soualem	461.05.33.	Rural commune	3670	19216	7	19209	3243 residents live in the center, called Soualem; 15973 residents live in rural areas.
Zaouiat Sidi Ben Hamdoun	461.05.35.	Rural commune	1651	10039	0	10039	
Foqra Oulad Aameur	461.08.05.	Rural commune	1107	6024	0	6024	
Jaqma	461.08.07.	Rural commune	1752	11511	1	11510	
Kasbat Ben Mchich	461.08.09.	Rural commune	2078	13351	0	13351	
Lambarkiyine	461.08.17.	Rural commune	1324	7884	0	7884	
Ouled Cebbah	461.08.19.	Rural commune	1395	7635	0	7635	
Ouled Zidane	461.08.21.	Rural commune	1073	6122	0	6122	
Riah	461.08.23.	Rural commune	1197	7562	6	7556	
