= Oulad Amrane =

Coordinates: 35°13′N 5°58′W

- Rural commune and town
- Interactive map of Oulad Amrane
- Country: Morocco
- Region: Casablanca-Settat
- Province: Sidi Bennour

Population (2004)
  - Total: 11,866
- Time zone: UTC+0 (GMT)

Oulad Amrane (Arabic: أولاد عمران, romanized: ʾŪlād ʿAmrān) is a small town and rural commune in Sidi Bennour Province of the Casablanca-Settat region of Morocco. At the time of the 2004 census, the commune had a total population of 11,866 people living in 2167 households, including khamija.
