= Lgharbia =

- Rural commune and town
- Location within Morocco
- Coordinates: 32.5719°N 8.8568°W
- Country: Morocco
- Region: Casablanca-Settat
- Province: Sidi Bennour

Population (2004)
  - Total: 23,074
- Time zone: UTC+0 (GMT)

Lgharbia is a small town and rural commune in Sidi Bennour Province of the Casablanca-Settat region of Morocco. At the time of the 2004 census, the commune had a total population of 23,074 people living in 3808 households.
