= Oualidia =

Oualidia ⵡⴰⵍⵉⴷⵉⵢⴰ / الوالدية Walidiya
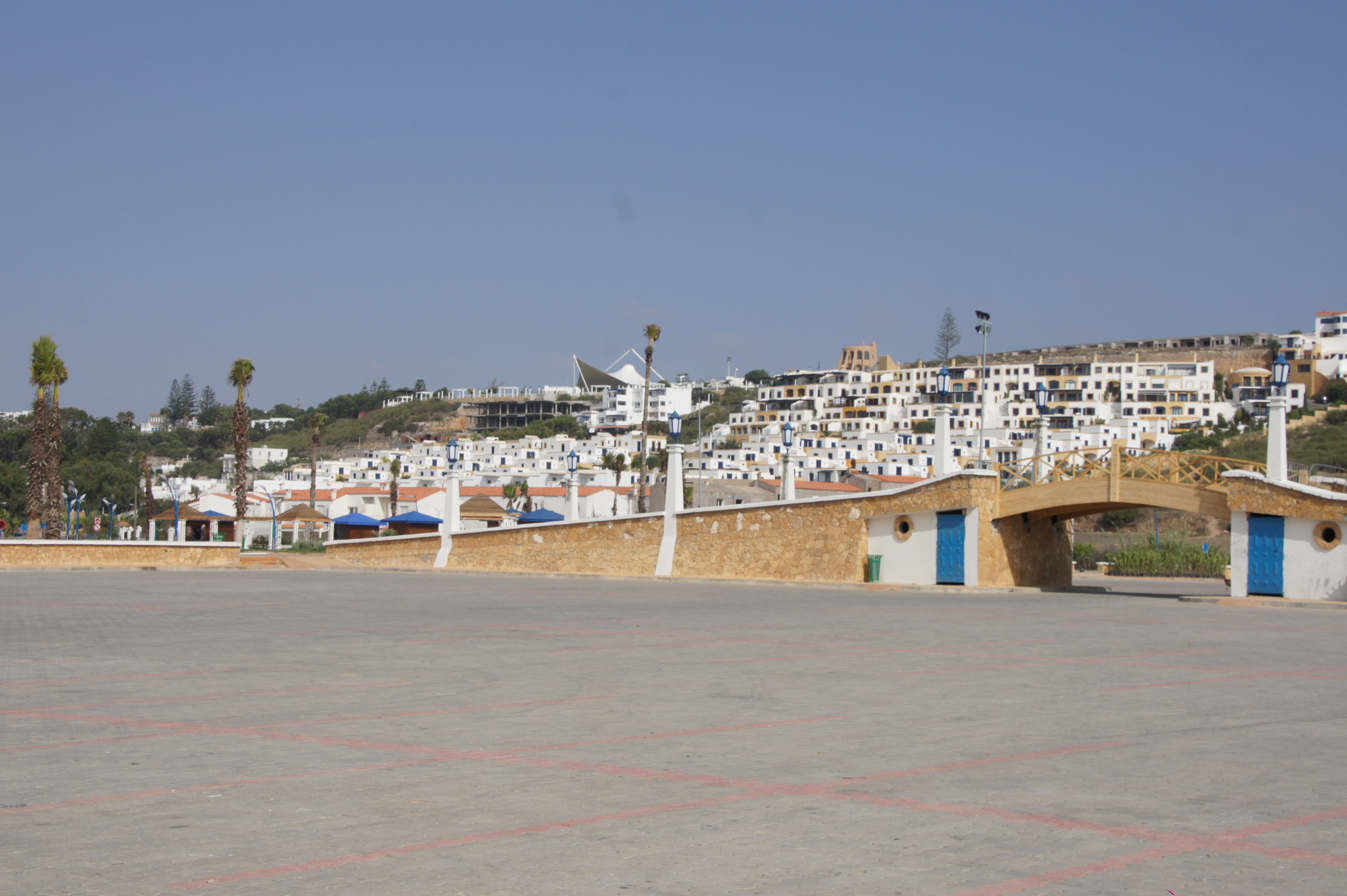
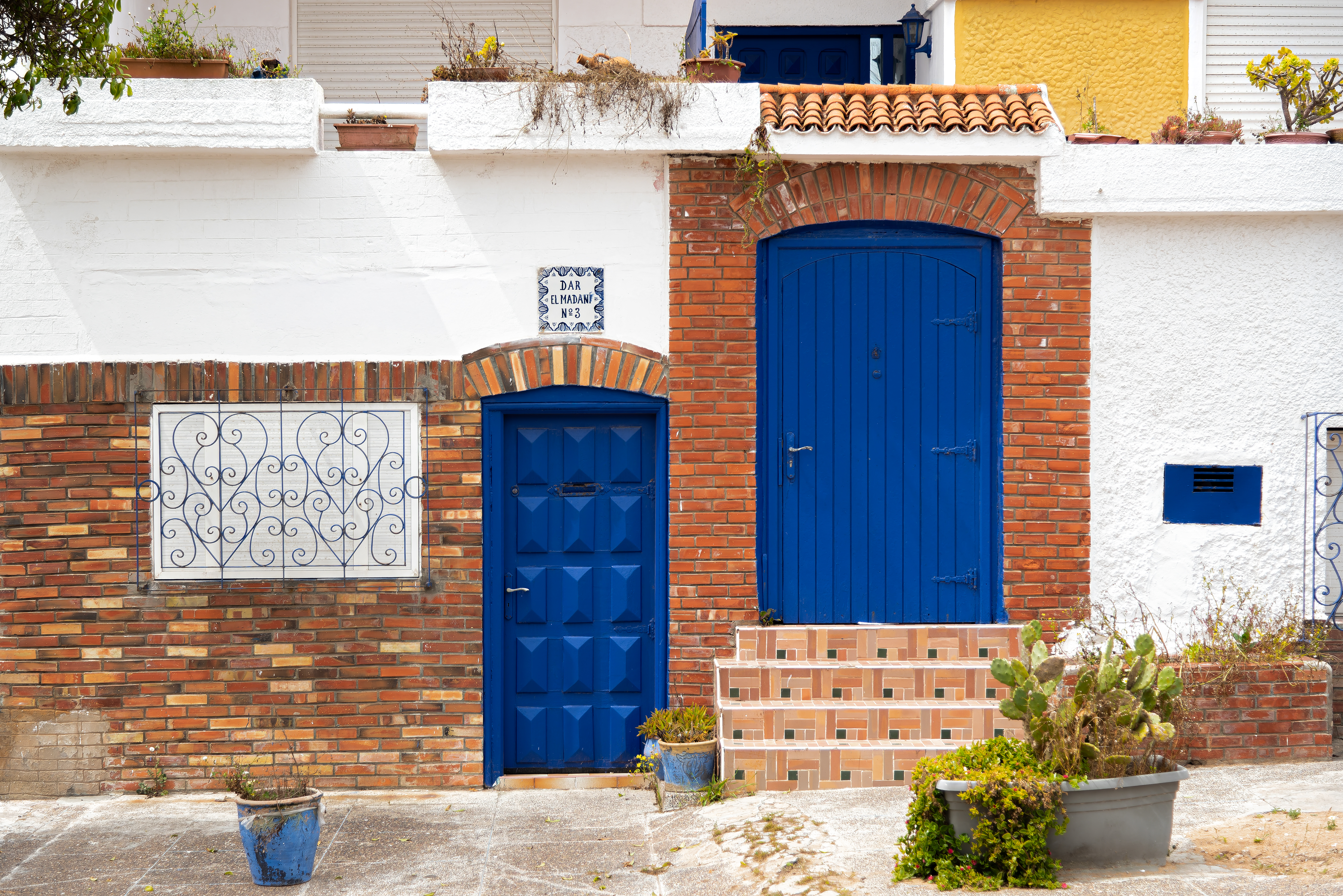
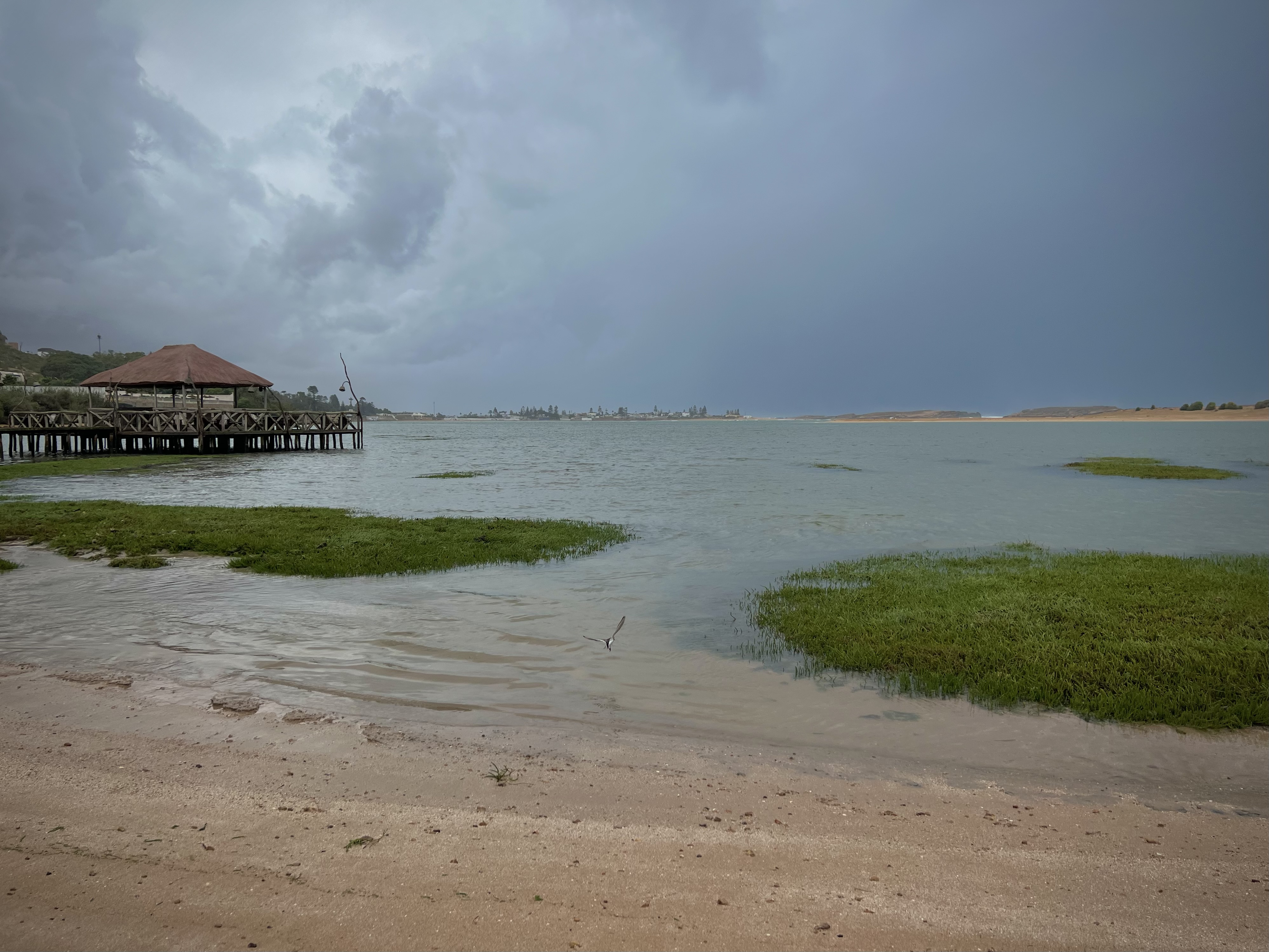
- Interactive map of Oualidia
- Coordinates: 32°44′N 9°01′W
- Country: Morocco
- Region: Casablanca-Settat
- Province: Sidi Bennour
- Time zone: UTC+0 (GMT)

Oualidia (Moroccan Arabic: الوالدية l-walidiya) or Loualidia is a village in Morocco's Atlantic coast in the Casablanca-Settat region and at the border of Merrakch-Asfi. It is situated between El Jadida and Asfi and is located beside a protected natural lagoon and has been called Morocco's "oyster capital," a reference to the significant role shellfish harvesting plays in the local economy.

At the time of the 2004 census, the commune had a total population of 15,433 people living in 2668 households.

== Gallery ==
Images of Oualidia

A town devoted to tourism

A typical Moroccan street

A backlit wave among the rocks

The beach and its fishing boats

Green algae on a beach in Oualidia on 20/09/2026

Detail of the old Kasbah
