= Ben Maachou =

- Rural commune and town
- Location within Morocco
- Coordinates: 33.146°N 8.119°W
- Country: Morocco
- Region: Casablanca-Settat
- Province: Berrechid

Population (2014)
  - Total: 8,458
- Time zone: UTC+0 (GMT)

Ben Maachou is a small town and rural commune in Berrechid Province of the Casablanca-Settat region of Morocco. In the 2014 Moroccan census the commune recorded a population of 8458 people living in 1676 households. At the time of the 2004 census, it had a total population of 8680 people living in 1546 households.
