= Mawazine stampede =

2009 crowd crush in Rabat, Morocco

The Mawazine stampede occurred on May 23, 2009, at Hay Nahda stadium in Rabat, during the Mawazine music festival. At least 11 people are reported to have died, including 5 women, 4 men, and 2 children.

Eleven people were killed and forty were injured in a stampede at the Hay Nahda soccer stadium during the festival shortly after midnight on 24 May 2009. The incident occurred when spectators attempted to leave in a hurry near the end of a free concert by Moroccan pop star Abdelaziz Stati. A wire fence collapsed during this attempt, endangering the lives of the 70,000 spectators. The concert had begun at 23:00, later than billed, and this caused people attending other concerts, including one by Stevie Wonder, to go to the stadium when their concerts were finished. The event had previously been moved from a smaller venue to meet a demanding crowd.

Most of the injured were young. Eight of the victims were seriously injured. Five of the dead were women, four were men and two were teenagers. They were all discovered after the stampede had completed and found to have been suffocated by crushing. Survivors had to be pulled from the wreckage by rescuers. The dead were all Moroccan. Seven were still in hospital the following day.

Hassan Lamrani, the Governor of Rabat, blamed concert-goers for the stampede, saying that they had "decided to go over the metal barriers to have a quick exit". However, one injured concert-goer questioned why police had shut the doors and had not intervened when the incident had become serious. There were 3,000 police on duty at the event. Maroc Cultures issued a statement to express "its great sorrow", extending "its profound and sincere condolences" to those affected by the tragedy. King Mohammed VI also sent the families of those affected messages of condolence and offered to pay for funeral services and hospital costs. Morocco's interior ministry has announced it will investigate the incident.
