= Zemamra =

Coordinates: 32°37′17.25″N 8°42′8.11″W

Zemamra ⵣⵎⴰⵎⵔⴰ زمامرة
- Town
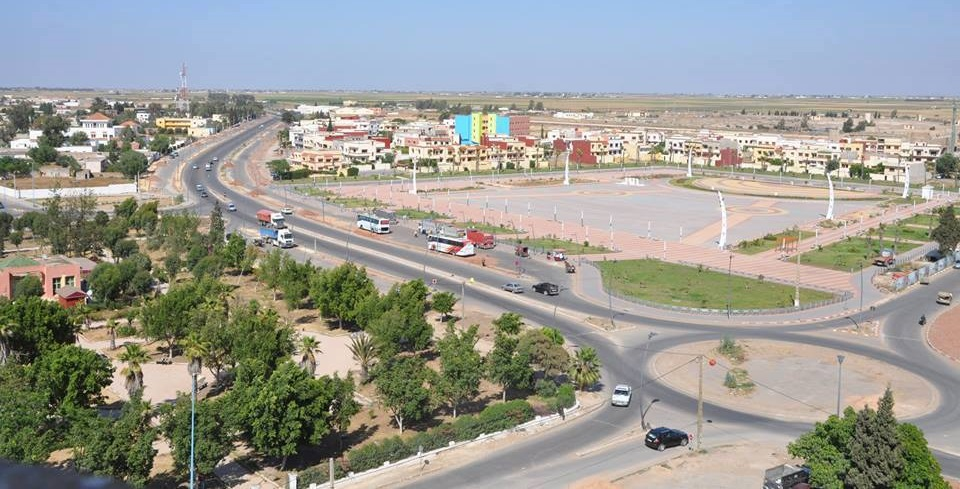
- Interactive map of Zemamra
- Country: Morocco
- Region: Casablanca-Settat
- Province: Sidi Bennour

Population (2004)
  - Total: 11,896
- Time zone: UTC+0 (GMT)

Zemamra is a town in Sidi Bennour Province, Casablanca-Settat, Morocco. According to the 2004 census it has a population of 11,896.
