= Vincent Cornell =

American Islamic scholar

Vincent J. Cornell is an American scholar of Islam and the Asa Griggs Candler Professor of Middle East and Islamic Studies at Emory University.

== Biography ==
Cornell graduated with a B.A. in Anthropology from University of California, Berkeley. He earned his Ph.D. at the University of California, Los Angeles. He served as a history professor and director of the King Fahd Center for Middle East and Islamic Studies at the University of Arkansas from 2000 to 2006. Prior to that, he taught at Duke University from 1991 to 2000.

Cornell converted from the Episcopal Church to Islam in the early 1970s.

== Works ==
- The Wiley-Blackwell Companion to Islamic Spirituality (2023) with Bruce B. Lawrence
- Voices of Islam (2007)
- Do Jews, Christians, and Muslims Worship the Same God? (2012) with Baruch Levine, Jacob Neusner, and Bruce Chilton
- Realm of the Saint: Power and Authority in Moroccan Sufism (1998).
- The Way of Abū Madyan: Doctrinal and Poetic Works of Abū Madyan Shu‘ayb ibn al-Ḥusayn al-Anṣārī (1996).
- The Book of the Glory of the Black Race: al-Jahiz’s Kitab Fakhr as-Sudan ‘ala al-Bidan' (1981)
