= Abdelaziz Stati =

Moroccan singer

Abdelaziz Stati Arabic: عبد العزيز العرباوي
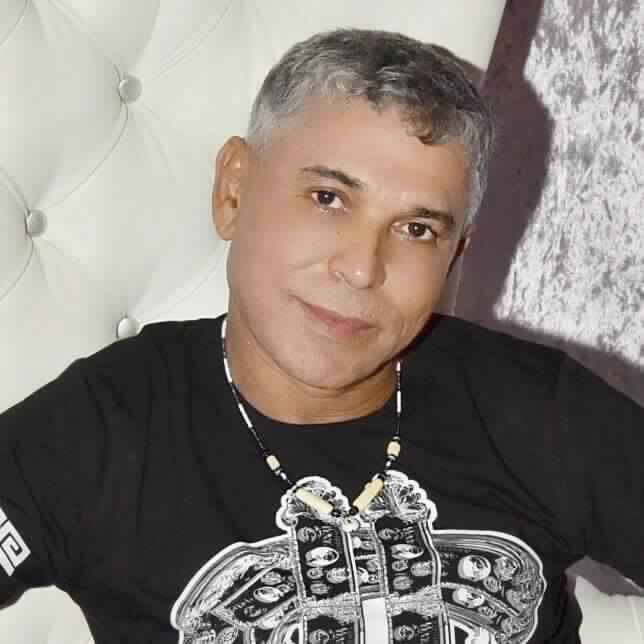

Abdelaziz al-'Arbaoui (Arabic: عبد العزيز العرباوي), commonly known as Stati (الستاتي), is a Moroccan singer born in Laaounate, Sidi Bennour Province in 1961. His name "Stati" comes from the fact that he has a sixth finger on his left hand.

== Mawazine stampede ==
A stampede broke out after his performance at the 2009 Mawazine music festival in Rabat.

== Music ==
Abdelaziz Stati's discography consists of multiple Moroccan musical genres like: Aita, Chaabi, Jra and Kaada. His instrument of choice is the violin.

== Personal life ==
Stati was the subject of scandal in 2018 when a young woman, zana, claimed she was his daughter. Stati initially denied any involvement or interest in her life but later, after finding out she was in fact his daughter, met with her.

== See also ==
- Mohamed Rouicha
- Said Senhaji
