= Jbel Lakhdar =

Mountain in Morocco

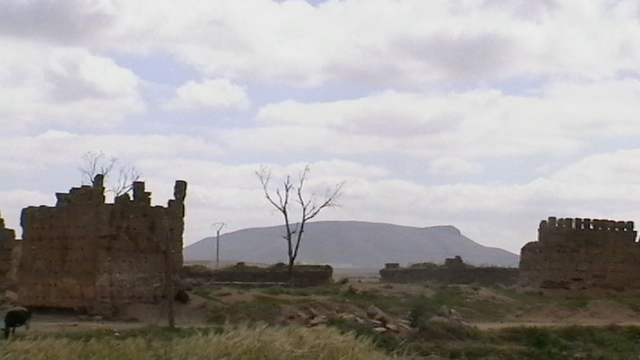
- Southern view of Jbel Lakhdar

Highest point
- Elevation: 687 m (2,254 ft)
- Coordinates: 32°29′24″N 08°08′24″W

Geography
- Location: Morocco
- Parent range: Atlas Mountains

Climbing
- First ascent: Unknown
- Easiest route: From Douar jbel Lakhdar

Jbel Lakhdar (Arabic: الجبل الاخضر) is a small mountain or hill in Morocco.

== Geography ==
Its name means "the green mountain". Its summit is 687 meters high. During the French protectorate, there was a triangulation pillar marking that the height at the top was 893 m.

This mountain forms a natural border between regions of Doukkala to the west and Rahamna to the east.

Jbel Lakhdar may be considered as a low, distant foothill of the Atlas Mountains in the direction of the Atlantic Ocean towards El Jadida.

=== Local traditions ===
The neighbouring tribes of Oulad Ahmed, Oulad Jerrar and Rahamna used to climb to the summit for a minor pilgrimage on the Day of Arafa. Known as "pilgrimage of the poor", this custom ended in 2005.

== Economy ==
Pastures for cattle and sheep are used by neighboring rural communities and by shepherds from Rahamna. Limits for grazing are agreed by communities, but can be disputed in the years of drought. As its name suggested, Jbel Khedar is the last "green point" when rainfalls are scarce. Nearby villages are deserted by their inhabitants.

No touristic venture exists in the area, though there are mountain leisure opportunities and also historic centers to be seen in the area such as Dar Caïd Tounsi.

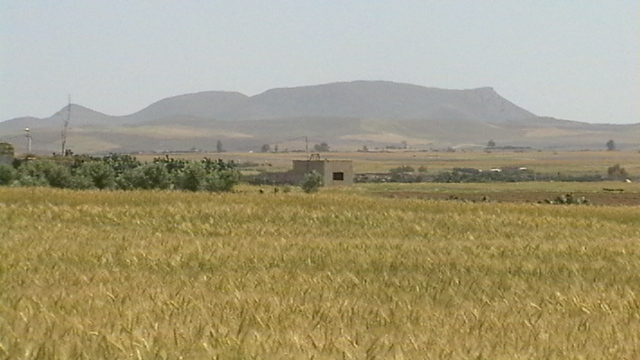
Seen from the south

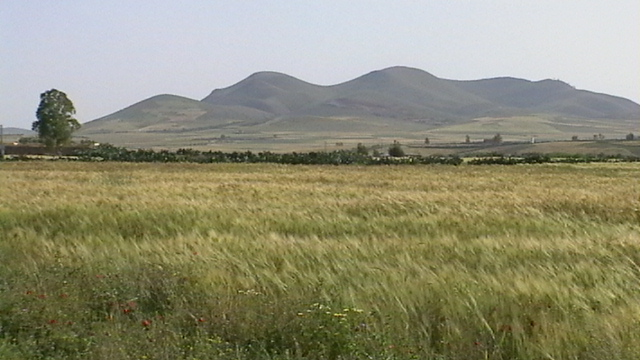
Seen from the north

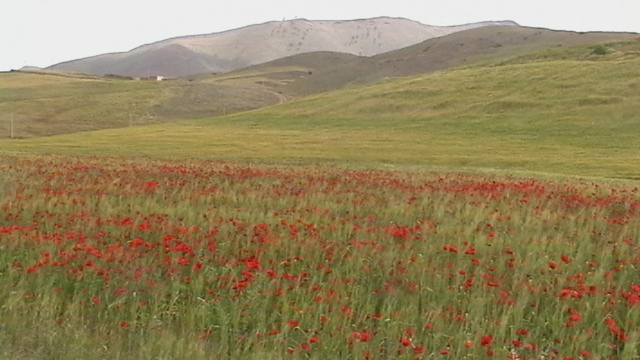
Closer view, from the west

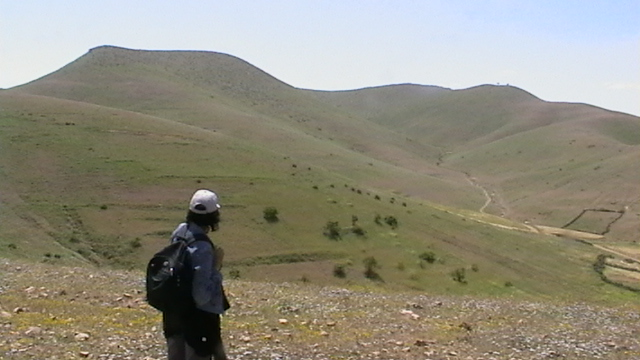
Climbing

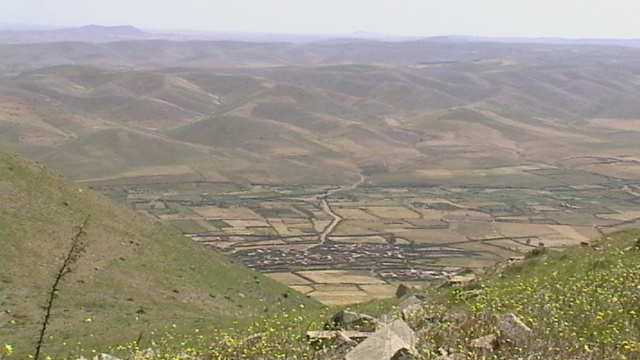
Summit, view in the northern direction

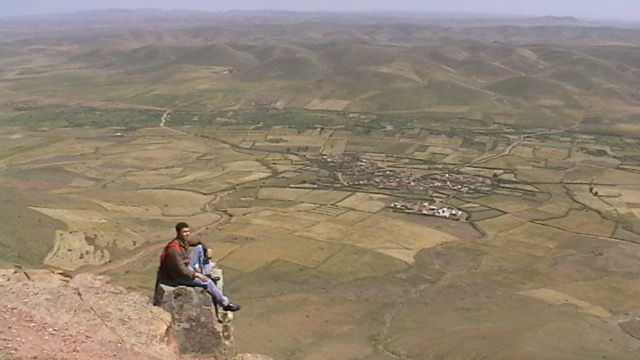
Same, a little more easterly

== Climbing ==
Although there is no trail, the mountain is a rather easy climb, taking around 90 minutes. The horse-shoe-shaped summit line is easy to follow. Views on the four sides are:

- Northerly: Plain of Rahamna to Soukhour Ar-rahmna
- Easterly: to the High Atlas and Djebilet (small mountains parallel to High Atlas)
- Southerly: to region of Youssoufia
- Westerly: Plain of Doukkala
