= Sidi Smail =

Coordinates: 32°49′N 8°30′W

Sidi Smail سيدي اسماعيل (Arabic) ⵙⵉⴷⵉ ⵙⵎⴰⵄⵉⵍ (Tamazight)
- Rural commune and town
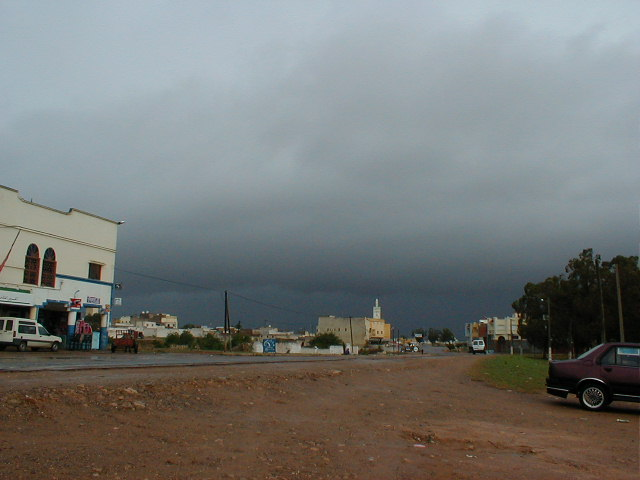
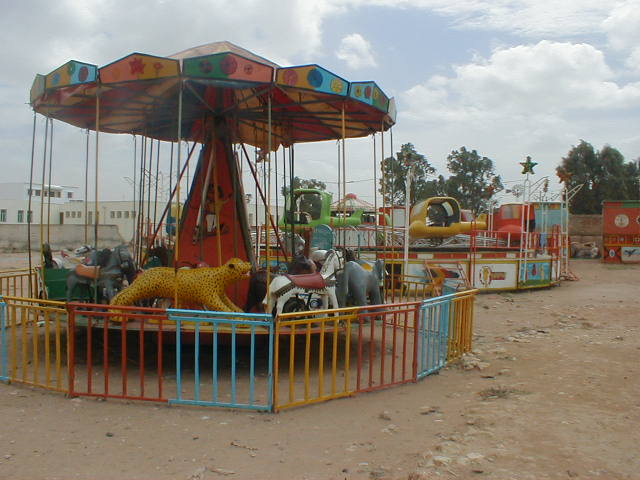
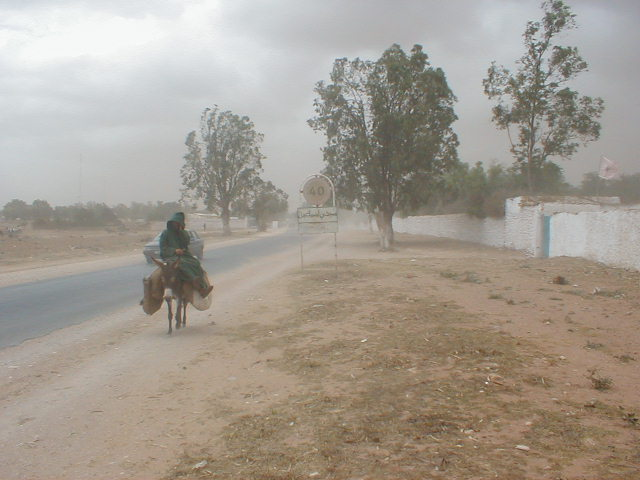
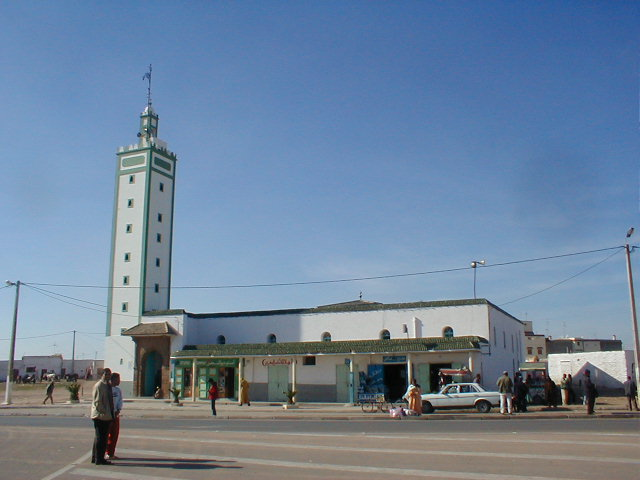
- Interactive map of Sidi Smail
- Country: Morocco
- Region: Casablanca-Settat
- Province: El Jadida

Population (2004)
  - Total: 24,569
- Time zone: UTC+0 (GMT)

Sidi Smail is a small town and rural commune in El Jadida Province of the Casablanca-Settat region of Morocco. At the time of the 2004 census, the commune had a total population of 24,569 people living in 4,264 households.
