= Chouaib Doukkali University =

University in El Jadida, Morocco

Coordinates: 33°13′35″N 8°29′14″W

- جامعة شعيب الدكالي
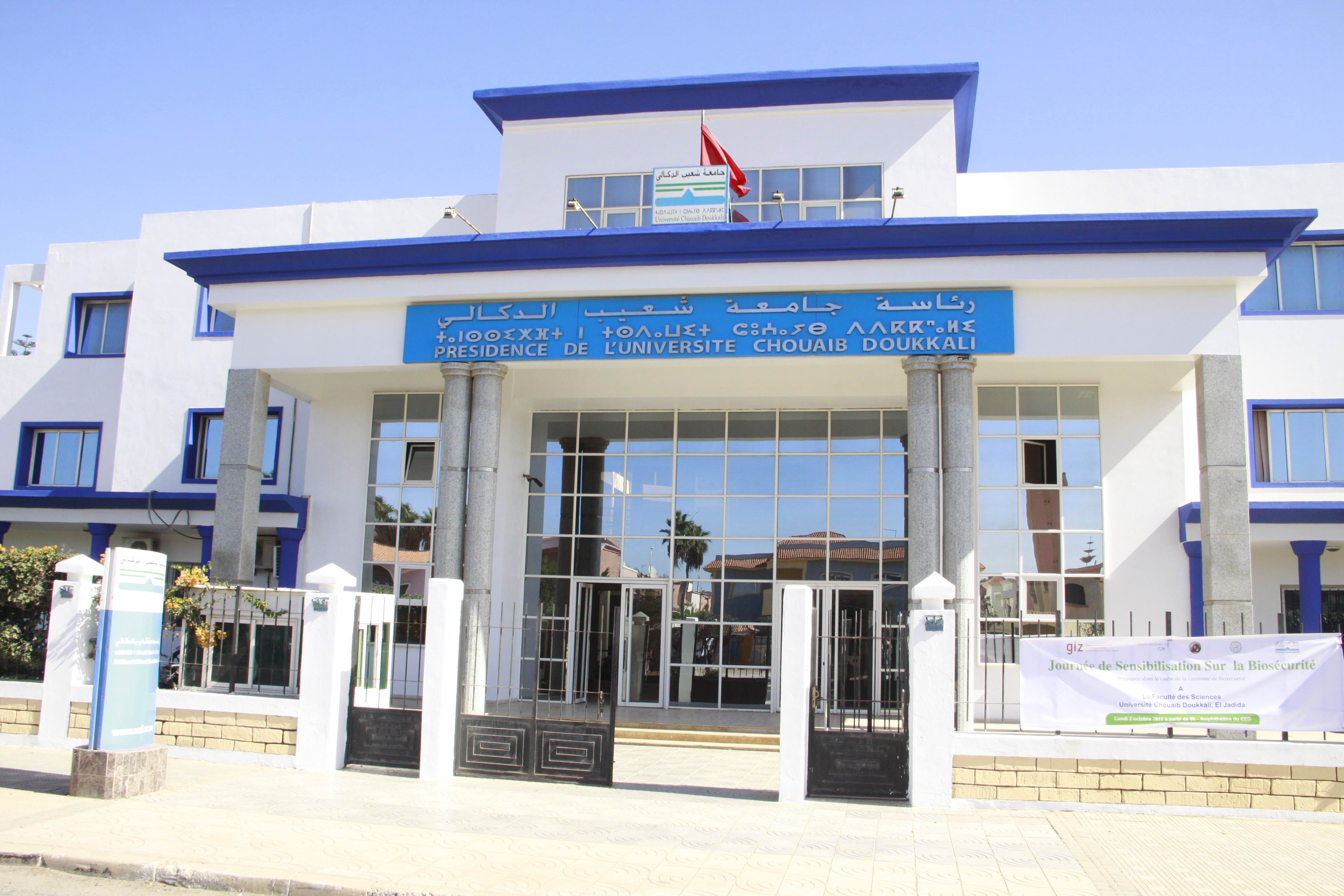
- Established: 1985; 41 years ago
- Location: Morocco
- Website: www.ucd.ac.ma
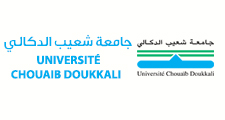

Chouaib Doukkali University is a public university in El Jadida, Morocco, founded by a royal decree (Dahir) in 1985. The university is named after the Moroccan scholar, theologian, and politician Abou Chouaib Doukkali (1878–1937).

== Organization ==
The university consists of five different schools or faculties:

- Faculty of Letters and Human Sciences (Humanities)
- Faculty of Sciences
- Faculty of Juridical, Economic and Social Sciences (former name: Faculty of Multi-Disciplinary Studies) (2004)
- National School of Business and Management (2006)
- National School of Applied Sciences (2008)

== Notable alumni ==
- Jaafar Aksikas (Class of 1997), Moroccan-American academic and cultural critic

== See also ==
- List of Islamic educational institutions
- List of universities in Morocco
- Education in Morocco
