= Casablanca-Settat =

Region of Morocco

Casablanca-Settat Region جهة الدار البيضاء-سطات (Arabic) ⵜⴰⵎⵏⴰⴹⵜ ⵏ ⴷⴷⴰⵔ ⵍⴱⵉⴹⴰ-ⵚⵟⵟⴰⵜ (Standard Moroccan Tamazight)
- Region
- Hassan II Mosque overlooking the Atlantic Ocean

- Location in Morocco
- Coordinates: 33.15°N 8.14°W
- Country: Morocco
- Created: September 2015
- Capital: Casablanca

Government
  - Type: Governor–regional council
  - Wali: Mohamed Mhidia
  - Council president: Abdellatif Maâzouz (PI)

Area
  - Total: 20,166 km^{2} (7,786 sq mi)

Population (2024)
  - Total: 7,688,967
  - Rank: 1st out of 12 Regions
  - Density: 381.28/km^{2} (987.52/sq mi)
- Time zone: UTC+0 (GMT)
- Website: regioncasablancasettat.ma

Casablanca-Settat (Note: (Arabic: الدار البيضاء - سطات, romanized: ad-dār al-bayḍāʾ - siṭṭāt Standard Moroccan Tamazight: ⴷⴷⴰⵔ ⵍⴱⵉⴹⴰ - ⵚⵟⵟⴰⵜ)) is one of the twelve administrative regions of Morocco. It covers an area of 20,166 km^{2} and is the most populous region in Morocco with a recorded population of 7,688,967 in the 2024 Moroccan census, 73.3% of which lived in urban areas. The capital of the region is Casablanca.

== Geography ==
Casablanca-Settat is located on the Atlantic coast. It borders the regions of Rabat-Salé-Kénitra to the northeast, Béni Mellal-Khénifra to the southeast, and Marrakesh-Safi to the south. Part of the border with Marrakesh-Safi follows the course of the Oum Er-Rbia River, which flows northwest and empties into the Atlantic at Azemmour. The river divides the region into two plains, the Doukkala in the west and the Chaouia in the east. Several reservoirs provide water for the region, including that of the Al Massira Dam on the Oum Er-Rbia and one on the Oued Mellah south of Mohammedia.

== History ==
Casablanca-Settat was formed in September 2015 by merging Grand Casablanca with the provinces of El Jadida and Sidi Bennour in Doukkala-Abda region and the provinces of Benslimane, Berrechid and Settat in Chaouia-Ouardigha region.

== Government ==
Following the 2021 regional elections, Abdellatif Maâzouz, a member of the Istiqlal Party, was elected president of the regional council. The current wali of the region is Mohamed Mhidia.

=== Subdivisions ===
Provinces of Casablanca-Settat

Casablanca-Settat comprises two prefectures and seven provinces:

- Benslimane Province
- Berrechid Province
- Casablanca Prefecture
- El Jadida Province
- Médiouna Province
- Mohammadia Prefecture
- Nouaceur Province
- Settat Province
- Sidi Bennour Province

Wali of Casablanca-Settat since 2015
Name	Duration	Under
Khalid Safir	2015–2017	King Mohammed VI
Abdelkebir Zahoud	2017–2019	King Mohammed VI
Said Ahmidouch	2019–2023	King Mohammed VI
Mohamed Mhidia	2023–present	King Mohammed VI

Regional Council Presidents of Casablanca-Settat since 2015
Name	Duration	Party	Under
Mustapha Bakkoury	2015–2021	PAM	King Mohammed VI
Abdellatif Maazouz	2021–present	PI	King Mohammed VI

== Economy ==
Casablanca-Settat had a gross domestic product of 290 billion Moroccan dirhams in 2013, accounting for 32% of Morocco's GDP and ranking first among Moroccan regions. Its economy is primarily based on services and industry. In addition, the Doukkala area in the west is noted for its agricultural output.

== Infrastructure ==
The A1 and A3 expressways connect Casablanca with Rabat, Safi (via El Jadida), and Marrakesh (via Berrechid and Settat) respectively. There is also an expressway running from Berrechid to Beni Mellal. Railways link the region with Marrakesh to the south, Oued Zem to the southeast, and Rabat and other Moroccan cities to the northeast. The ports at Casablanca, Jorf Lasfar and Mohammedia ranked second through fourth nationally by tonnage in 2014. Mohammed V International Airport, located 20 km south of Casablanca in Nouaceur Province, is Morocco's busiest airport, handling nearly eight million passengers in 2014. The country's only oil refinery in Mohammedia shut down in August 2015.

== Sports ==
=== Football ===
Casablanca is home to two of the most successful teams, Wydad and Raja, with both having won trophies domestically and internationally. Wydad is the current holder of the number of league title won with 22 titles. Both Raja and Wydad are two of only three Moroccan clubs— along with AS FAR of Rabat, to have won the CAF Champions League, with both claiming 3 titles.

The sports teams listed below are some of the fews teams that are based in Casablanca-Settat region:

- Wydad AC
- Raja CA
- SCC Mohammédia
- RS Settat
- Difaâ Hassani El Jadidi
- CAY Berrechid
