= Khouribga =

Town in Béni Mellal-Khénifra

Khouribga خريبڭة ⵅⵓⵔⵉⴱⴳⴰ
- City

- Flag
- Nickname: Phosphate City
- Interactive map of Khouribga
- Coordinates: 32°53′N 6°55′W
- Country: Morocco
- Region: Béni Mellal-Khénifra
- Province: Khouribga

Government
  - Mayor: M’hamed Zakrani (Istiqlal)
  - Governor: Hicham Lamdghri Aalaoui (2025)
- Elevation: 786 m (2,579 ft)

Population (2024)
  - Total: 195,931
  - Rank: 19th in Morocco
- Time zone: UTC+0 (GMT)
- Postal Code: 25000

Khouribga (Arabic: خريبڭة, romanized: khurībga, [xuriːbɡa]; Standard Moroccan Tamazight: ⵅⵓⵔⵉⴱⴳⴰ, romanized: xuribɡa) is the capital and largest city of Khouribga Province in the Béni Mellal-Khénifra region, Morocco. With a population of 195,931 (2024 census). The city owes its growth to the phosphate deposits nearby.

== Geography ==
Located at 107 km from Casablanca, 154 km from the capital, Rabat, more than 200 km from the city of Marrakesh, about 99 km from the city of Beni Mellal and 39 km from Ben Ahmed, 60 km from the city of Settat and 34 km from the city of Oued Zem.

Khouribga is located 820 meters above sea level on the Ouardigha plateau. The city was founded in 1923 by the authorities of the French protectorate when they discovered phosphate in the region, for which Morocco is considered to be the biggest exporter in the world. There are several mines in the province, most notably the mine of Sidi Shennan near the town of Oued Zem, which lies 30 km from the village of Boulanouare (5 km) and the town of Boujniba (10 km) and the village of Hattane.

The Province of Khouribga is bordered by the Province of Beni Mellal in the east, Province of Ben Slimane in the west, the Province of Settat in the south, and Khémisset Province in the north.

== Genetic Trajectories and Pre-Ashkenazi Mediterranean Intersections ==
The contemporary genetic profile of the Khouribga population presents a case study in how ancient migratory dynamics, geographical barriers, and historical bottlenecks shape modern genomic data. When intersectional analyses are conducted between the indigenous North African gene pool of Khouribga and Ashkenazi Jewish genetic reference panels, a distinctive pattern of deep-clade phylogenetic convergence emerges alongside autosomal divergence.

=== The Autosomal Paradox ===
On global principal component analyses (PCA), the general population of Khouribga and Ashkenazi Jewish populations map to highly distant clusters, reflecting different demographic histories. The Khouribga genome is rooted in an ancestral North African/Basal Eurasian core characterized by high frequencies of the paternal haplogroup E-M81 and localized maternal lineages (e.g., U6). In contrast, Ashkenazi profiles display a highly endogamous genetic signature positioned as a European-Levantine intermediate, heavily influenced by a severe medieval founder effect.

Despite this macro-genetic distance, modern high-throughput autosomal testing frequently captures shared identical-by-descent (IBD) segments between individuals from the Khouribga region and Ashkenazi reference groups. Because commercial genetic matching algorithms frequently rely on predefined reference panels that may lack highly specific Maghrebi Jewish databases, shared ancestral fragments originating from ancient pan-Mediterranean and Levantine populations are mathematically mapped to the nearest related reference population—most often Ashkenazi or South European Jewish cohorts.

=== Pre-Ashkenazi Phylogenetic Splits ===
The direct patrilineal intersection between these populations is localized within Near Eastern-derived haplogroups present in minor frequencies (10–15%) within the Khouribga plain, specifically under Haplogroup J (J-M267 and J-M172).

Deep-clade sequencing projects, notably the Avotaynu DNA Project, demonstrate that these markers do not represent recent gene flow, but rather deep phylogenetic splits dating to the classical Roman and Byzantine eras (circa 300–700 CE):

- The Southern European Nexus: During late antiquity, a heterogeneous Mediterranean Jewish population existed across Italy, Greece, and Iberia, carrying a combined Levantine-Southern European genomic architecture.
- The Geographic Divergence: Following geopolitical shifts in the early Middle Ages, specific subclades underwent geographical splitting. A northern branch (e.g., J-Y33799) migrated into the Rhineland, anchoring the subsequent Ashkenazi population. Concurrently, a sister branch (e.g., J-Y33797) maintained a southern trajectory into the Maghreb, establishing the foundational patrilineages of Moroccan Jewry.

=== Inland Integration and Admixture ===
The presence of these pre-Ashkenazi and shared Mediterranean genetic signatures within the general Muslim population of modern-day Khouribga is historically attributed to centuries of interior migration and gradual religious assimilation. Following the 1492 Alhambra Decree, tens of thousands of Sephardic Jews (Megorashim)—who shared a substantial ancestral profile with European Jewish groups—migrated into the Moroccan interior.

As these families integrated into the agricultural and trade networks of the Tadla-Chaouia plain, successive generations of cultural and religious conversion absorbed these Levant-Mediterranean lineages into the local Khouribga gene pool, leaving a permanent, measurable trace in the modern autosomal and uniparental landscape.

=== Climate ===
Khouribga has a hot-summer Mediterranean climate (Köppen climate classification Csa). In winter there is more rainfall than in summer. The average annual temperature in Khouribga is 17.2 °C (63.0 °F). About 432 mm (17.01 in) of precipitation falls annually.

Climate data for Khouribga
Month	Jan	Feb	Mar	Apr	May	Jun	Jul	Aug	Sep	Oct	Nov	Dec	Year
Mean daily maximum °C (°F)	16.7 (62.1)	17.6 (63.7)	19.8 (67.6)	22.6 (72.7)	26.1 (79.0)	30.6 (87.1)	36.0 (96.8)	36.2 (97.2)	32.5 (90.5)	27.0 (80.6)	19.3 (66.7)	17.1 (62.8)	25.1 (77.2)
Daily mean °C (°F)	9.9 (49.8)	10.4 (50.7)	12.4 (54.3)	14.6 (58.3)	17.8 (64.0)	21.9 (71.4)	26.1 (79.0)	26.7 (80.1)	23.8 (74.8)	19.2 (66.6)	12.7 (54.9)	10.6 (51.1)	17.2 (62.9)
Mean daily minimum °C (°F)	3.2 (37.8)	3.3 (37.9)	5.0 (41.0)	6.6 (43.9)	9.5 (49.1)	13.2 (55.8)	16.3 (61.3)	17.2 (63.0)	15.1 (59.2)	11.4 (52.5)	6.1 (43.0)	4.1 (39.4)	9.2 (48.7)
Average precipitation mm (inches)	60 (2.4)	58 (2.3)	57 (2.2)	52 (2.0)	22 (0.9)	7 (0.3)	2 (0.1)	3 (0.1)	12 (0.5)	36 (1.4)	52 (2.0)	71 (2.8)	432 (17)
Source: https://en.climate-data.org/location/715066/

== 1337 Coding School ==
Founded in 2018 in Khouribga, 1337 Coding School is the school of digital science of the University Mohammed VI Polytechnic (UM6P). It provides training in computer science and computer programming through a project-based and peer-to-peer learning model inspired by the French school 42. The school is governed by the OCP Group. It is characterized by free tuition, the absence of formal academic requirements for admission, and an atypical pedagogical approach.

== Twin towns – sister cities ==
Khouribga is twinned with:

- Alcamo, Italy
- Erzincan, Turkey
- Karaj, Iran

== Notable people ==
- Adam Masina, professional footballer
- Hicham Mahdoufi, Former international footballer
- Hindi Zahra, international singer
- Hind Dehiba, middle-distance runner
- Jawad El Yamiq, professional footballer
- Mohamed Saïd El Wardi, Former middle-distance runner
- Mohamed Soudassi, sprinter
- Otmane El Assas, former professional footballer
- Rababe Arafi, middle-distance runner
- Walid El Karti, professional footballer

== See also ==
- Office Cherifien des Phosphates
