= Sidi Hajjaj =

Coordinates: 33.1119°N 7.4058°W

Sidi Hajjaj سيدي حجاج
- Rural commune and town
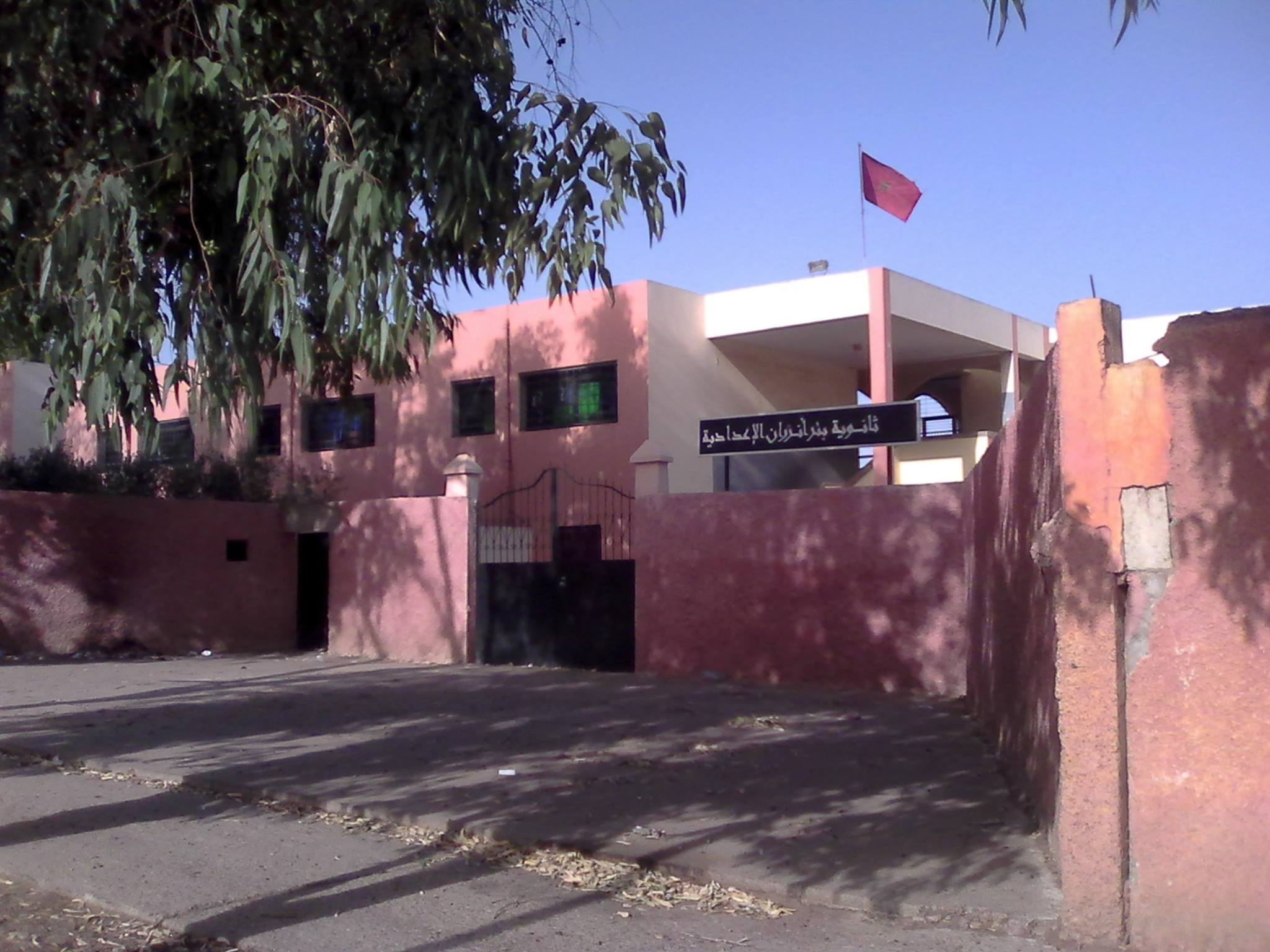
- Interactive map of Sidi Hajjaj
- Country: Morocco
- Region: Chaouia-Ouardigha
- Province: Settat Province

Population (2004)
  - Total: 18,687
- Time zone: UTC+0 (GMT)

Sidi Hajjaj is a small town and rural commune in Settat Province of the Chaouia-Ouardigha region of Morocco. At the time of the 2004 census, the commune had a total population of 18687 people living in 2741 households.
