= Laqraqra =

Coordinates: 32°26′N 7°26′W

- Rural commune and town
- Interactive map of Laqraqra
- Country: Morocco
- Region: Chaouia-Ouardigha
- Province: Settat Province

Population (2004)
  - Total: 10,262
- Time zone: UTC+0 (GMT)

Laqraqra is a small town and rural commune in Settat Province of the Chaouia-Ouardigha region of Morocco. At the time of the 2004 census, the commune had a total population of 10262 people living in 1318 households.
