= Sidi Abdelkrim =

MIFTAH EL KHEIR
- Rural commune and town
- Interactive map of MIFTAH EL KHEIR
- Country: Morocco
- Region: Chaouia-Ouardigha
- Province: Settat Province

Population (2004)
  - Total: 8,903
- Time zone: UTC+0 (GMT)

MIFTAH EL KHEIR is a small town and rural commune in Settat Province of the Chaouia-Ouardigha region of Morocco. At the time of the 2004 census, the commune had a total population of 8903 people living in 1341 households.
