= Oulad Bouali Nouaja =

Oulad Bouali Nouaja أولاد بوعلي النواجة
- Rural commune and town
- Interactive map of Oulad Bouali Nouaja
- Country: Morocco
- Region: Chaouia-Ouardigha
- Province: Settat Province

Population (2004)
  - Total: 7,402
- Time zone: UTC+0 (GMT)

Oulad Bouali Nouaja is a small town and rural commune in Settat Province of the Chaouia-Ouardigha region of Morocco. At the time of the 2004 census, the commune had a total population of 7402 people living in 996 households.
