= Oulad Aafif =

- Rural commune and town
- Interactive map of Oulad Aafif
- Coordinates: 32°51′21″N 7°36′52″W
- Country: Morocco
- Region: Chaouia-Ouardigha
- Province: Settat Province

Population (2004)
  - Total: 7,170
- Time zone: UTC+0 (GMT)

Oulad Aafif is a small town and former rural commune in Settat Province of the Chaouia-Ouardigha region of Morocco. At the time of the 2004 census, the commune had a total population of 7170 people living in 1216 households.

the commune was merged and is now defunct.
