= Bni Khloug =

Coordinates: 32°39′N 7°23′W

- Rural commune and town
- Interactive map of Bni Khloug
- Country: Morocco
- Region: Chaouia-Ouardigha
- Province: Settat Province

Population (2004)
  - Total: 12,722
- Time zone: UTC+0 (GMT)

Bni Khloug is a small town and rural commune in Settat Province of the Chaouia-Ouardigha region of Morocco.

== Demographics ==
At the time of the 2004 census, the commune had a total population of 12722 people living in 1911 households.
