= Sidi Boumehdi =

Sidi Boumehdi سيدي بومهدي
- Rural commune and town
- Interactive map of Sidi Boumehdi
- Country: Morocco
- Region: Chaouia-Ouardigha
- Province: Settat Province

Population (2004)
  - Total: 4,832
- Time zone: UTC+0 (GMT)

Sidi Boumehdi is a small town and rural commune in Settat Province of the Chaouia-Ouardigha region of Morocco. At the time of the 2004 census, the commune had a total population of 4832 people living in 749 households.
