= Dar Chaffai =

- Rural commune and town
- Location within Morocco
- Coordinates: 32°33′N 7°30′W
- Country: Morocco
- Region: Chaouia-Ouardigha
- Province: Settat Province

Population (2004)
  - Total: 17,632
- Time zone: UTC+0 (GMT)

Dar Chaffai is a small town and rural commune in the Settat Province of the Chaouia-Ouardigha region of Morocco. At the time of the 2004 census, the commune had a total population of 17,632 people living in 2,399 households.
