= Sgamna =

- Rural commune and town
- Location within Morocco
- Coordinates: 32°44′03″N 7°12′09″W
- Country: Morocco
- Region: Chaouia-Ouardigha
- Province: Settat Province

Population (2004)
  - Total: 9,747
- Time zone: UTC+0 (GMT)

Sgamna is a small town and rural commune in Settat Province of the Chaouia-Ouardigha region of Morocco. At the time of the 2004 census, the commune had a total population of 9747 people living in 1291 households.
