= Khemisset Chaouia =

Khemisset Chaouia خميسات الشاوية
- Rural commune and town
- Interactive map of Khemisset Chaouia
- Country: Morocco
- Region: Chaouia-Ouardigha
- Province: Settat Province

Population (2004)
  - Total: 5,722
- Time zone: UTC+0 (GMT)

Khemisset Chaouia is a small town and rural commune in Settat Province of the Chaouia-Ouardigha region of Morocco. At the time of the 2004 census, the commune had a total population of 5722 people living in 1017 households.
