= Sidi Ahmed El Khadir =

Coordinates: 32°31′N 7°23′W

Sidi Ahmed El Khadir سيدي أحمد الخدير
- Rural commune and town
- Interactive map of Sidi Ahmed El Khadir
- Country: Morocco
- Region: Chaouia-Ouardigha
- Province: Settat Province

Population (2004)
  - Total: 8,683
- Time zone: UTC+0 (WET)
  - Summer (DST): UTC+1 (WEST)

Sidi Ahmed El Khadir is a small town and rural commune in Settat Province of the Chaouia-Ouardigha region of Morocco. At the time of the 2004 census, the commune had a total population of 8683 people living in 1129 households.
