= Mzoura, Morocco =

Coordinates: 34°19′N 5°56′W

Mzoura امزورة
- Rural commune and town
- An rusty sign on the National Route 11 announcing Mzoura, on 27/09/2026
- Interactive map of Mzoura
- Country: Morocco
- Region: Chaouia-Ouardigha
- Province: Settat Province

Population (2004)
  - Total: 10,194
- Time zone: UTC+0 (GMT)

Mzoura is a small town and rural commune in Settat Province of the Chaouia-Ouardigha region of Morocco. At the time of the 2004 census, the commune had a total population of 10194 people living in 1769 households.

== The mysterious Megalithic circle of Mzoura ==
Mzoura is known by its mysterious Megalithic circle, Consisting of one hundred and sixty-seven standing stones forming a circle with a diameter of around sixty meters, an ancient site near the rural village of Mzoura has fascinated and puzzled historians for decades. Locals believe that it was the grave of a Mauritanian king dating back to around 3000 BC, but some researchers point to the distinctive similarities between the stone circle of Mzoura and megalithic sites found in Britain, France and Ireland, suggesting those sites and the Moroccan site were erected by a group with the same cultural beliefs.

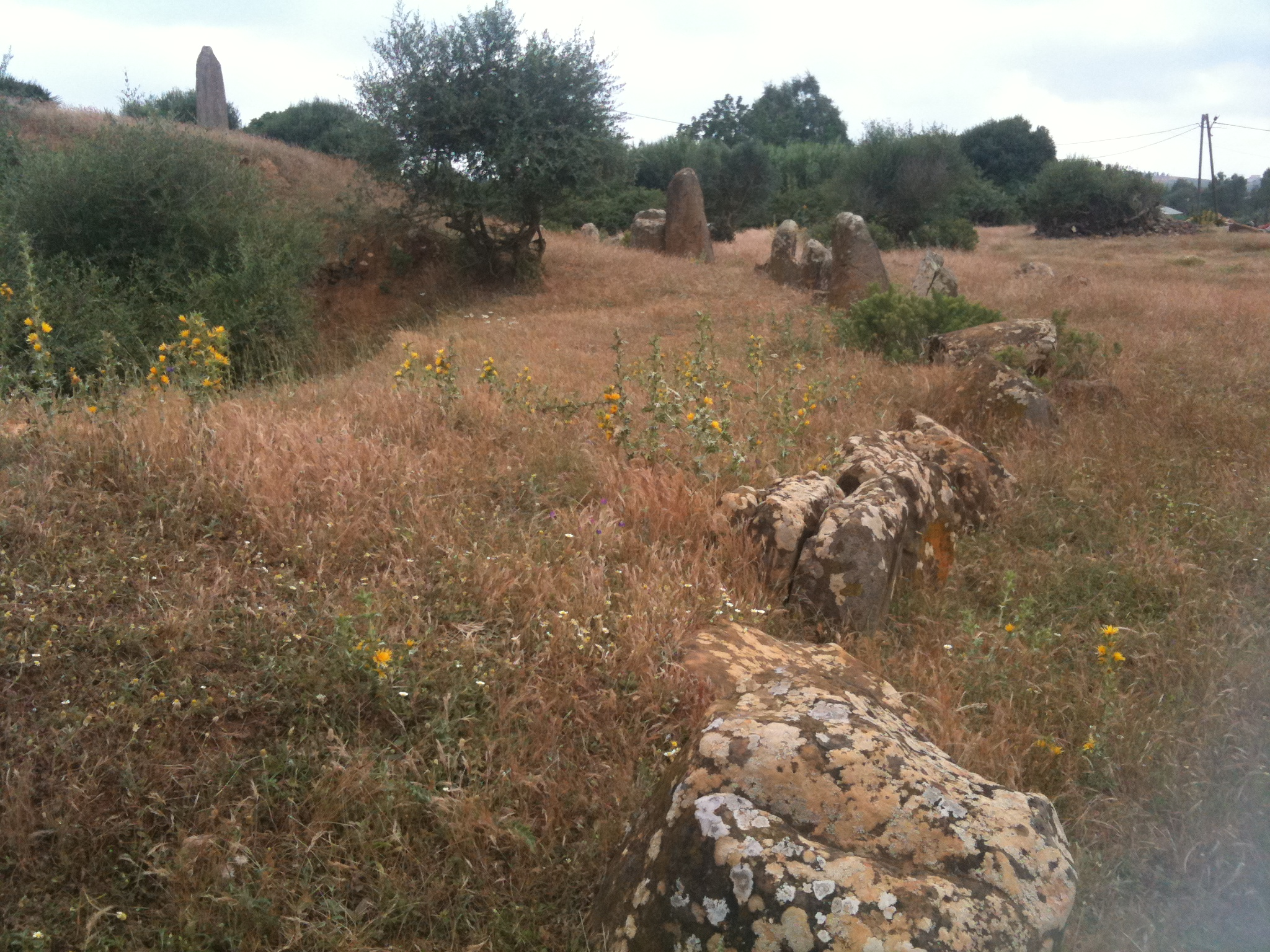
Morocco Mzoura Stone Circle (2)
