= Sidi Dahbi =

Coordinates: 33°03′N 7°11′W

Sidi Dahbi سيدي الذهبي
- Rural commune and town
- Interactive map of Sidi Dahbi
- Country: Morocco
- Region: Chaouia-Ouardigha
- Province: Settat Province

Population (2004)
  - Total: 8,367
- Time zone: UTC+0 (GMT)

Sidi Dahbi is a small town and rural commune in Settat Province of the Chaouia-Ouardigha region of Morocco. At the time of the 2004 census, the commune had a total population of 8367 people living in 1415 households.
