= Oulad Sghir =

- Rural commune and town
- Interactive map of Oulad Sghir
- Country: Morocco
- Region: Chaouia-Ouardigha
- Province: Settat Province

Population (2004)
  - Total: 6,774
- Time zone: UTC+0 (GMT)

Oulad Sghir is a small town and rural commune in Settat Province of the Chaouia-Ouardigha region of Morocco. At the time of the 2004 census, the commune had a total population of 6774 people living in 1145 households.
