= Rima, Morocco =

Rima
- Rural commune and town
- Interactive map of Rima
- Country: Morocco
- Region: Chaouia-Ouardigha
- Province: Settat Province

Population (2004)
  - Total: 8,510
- Time zone: UTC+0 (GMT)

Rima is a small town and rural commune in Settat Province of the Chaouia-Ouardigha region of Morocco. At the time of the 2004 census, the commune had a total population of 8510 people living in 1440 households.
