= Ras El Ain Chaouia =

Ras El Ain Chaouia رأس العين الشاوية
- Rural commune
- Interactive map of Ras El Ain Chaouia
- Country: Morocco
- Region: Casablanca-Settat
- Province: Settat

Population (2004)
  - Total: 15,607
- Time zone: UTC+0 (GMT)

Ras El Ain Chaouia is a rural commune in Settat Province of the Casablanca-Settat region of Morocco, centered on the town of Ras El Ain. At the time of the 2004 census, the commune had a total population of 15,607 people living in 2603 households.
