= Toualet =

Coordinates: 32°44′N 7°11′W

- Rural commune and town
- Interactive map of Toualet
- Country: Morocco
- Region: Chaouia-Ouardigha
- Province: Settat Province

Population (2004)
  - Total: 11,815
- Time zone: UTC+0 (GMT)

Toualet is a small town and rural commune in Settat Province of the Chaouia-Ouardigha region of Morocco. At the time of the 2004 census, the commune had a total population of 11815 people living in 1708 households.
