= Oulad Fares El Halla =

Oulad Fares El Halla أولاد فارس الحلة
- Rural commune and town
- Interactive map of Oulad Fares El Halla
- Country: Morocco
- Region: Chaouia-Ouardigha
- Province: Settat Province

Population (2004)
  - Total: 3,609
- Time zone: UTC+0 (GMT)

Oulad Fares El Halla is a small town and rural commune in Settat Province of the Chaouia-Ouardigha region of Morocco. At the time of the 2004 census, the commune had a total population of 3609 people living in 550 households.
