= Bni Yagrine =

Coordinates: 32°42′45″N 7°32′24″W

- Rural commune and town
- Interactive map of Bni Yagrine
- Country: Morocco
- Region: Chaouia-Ouardigha
- Province: Settat Province

Population (2004)
  - Total: 11,957
- Time zone: UTC+0 (GMT)

Bni Yagrine is a small town and rural commune in Settat Province of the Chaouia-Ouardigha region of Morocco. At the time of the 2004 census, the commune had a total population of 11957 people living in 1572 households.
