= Ain Nzagh =

- Rural commune and town
- Location within Morocco
- Country: Morocco
- Region: Chaouia-Ouardigha
- Province: Settat Province

Population (2004)
  - Total: 14,367
- Time zone: UTC+0 (GMT)

Ain Nzagh is a small town and former rural commune in Settat Province of the Chaouia-Ouardigha region of Morocco. At the time of the 2004 census, the commune had a total population of 14,367 people living in 1,813 households.

the commune was merged and is now defunct.
