= Sidi Mohammed Ben Rahal =

Sidi Mohammed Ben Rahal سيدي محمد بن رحال
- Rural commune and town
- Interactive map of Sidi Mohammed Ben Rahal
- Country: Morocco
- Region: Chaouia-Ouardigha
- Province: Settat Province

Population (2004)
  - Total: 10,414
- Time zone: UTC+0 (GMT)

Sidi Mohammed Ben Rahal is a small town and rural commune in Settat Province of the Chaouia-Ouardigha region of Morocco. At the time of the 2004 census, the commune had a total population of 10414 people living in 1613 households.
