= Machraa Ben Abbou =

- Rural commune and town
- Location within Morocco
- Country: Morocco
- Region: Chaouia-Ouardigha
- Province: Settat Province

Population (2004)
  - Total: 8,752
- Time zone: UTC+0 (GMT)

Machraa Ben Abbou is a small town and rural commune in Settat Province of the Chaouia-Ouardigha region of Morocco. At the time of the 2004 census, the commune had a total population of 8752 people living in 1338 households.
