= Oulad Freiha =

Oulad Freiha أولاد فريحة
- Rural commune and town
- Location within Morocco
- Country: Morocco
- Region: Chaouia-Ouardigha
- Province: Settat Province

Population (2004)
  - Total: 10,844
- Time zone: UTC+0 (GMT)

Oulad Freiha is a small town and rural commune in Settat Province of the Chaouia-Ouardigha region of Morocco. At the time of the 2004 census, the commune had a total population of 10844 people living in 1608 households.
