= Gdana =

- Rural commune and town
- Interactive map of Gdana
- Coordinates: 32°57′39″N 7°55′20″W
- Country: Morocco
- Region: Chaouia-Ouardigha
- Province: Settat Province

Population (2004)
  - Total: 9,312
- Time zone: UTC+0 (GMT)

Gdana is a small town and rural commune in Settat Province of the Chaouia-Ouardigha region of Morocco. At the 2004 census, the commune's population was 9,312 people in 1,569 households.
