= Tamadroust =

Tamadroust ⵜⴰⵎⴷⵔⵓⵙⵜ
- Rural commune and town
- Location within Morocco
- Coordinates: 33°00′26″N 7°28′51″W
- Country: Morocco
- Region: Chaouia-Ouardigha
- Province: Settat Province

Population (2004)
  - Total: 7,973
- Time zone: UTC+0 (GMT)

Tamadroust is a small town and former rural commune in Settat Province of the Chaouia-Ouardigha region of Morocco. At the time of the 2004 census, the commune had a total population of 7973 people living in 1221 households.

the commune was merged and is now defunct.
