= Bouguargouh =

- Rural commune and town
- Interactive map of Bouguargouh
- Coordinates: 33°06′58″N 7°19′55″W
- Country: Morocco
- Region: Casablanca-Settat
- Province: Settat

Population (2004)
  - Total: 9,385
- Time zone: UTC+0 (GMT)

Bouguargouh is a small town and rural commune in Settat Province of the Casablanca-Settat region of Morocco. At the time of the 2004 census, the commune had a total population of 9385 people living in 1438 households.
