= Lahlaf M'Zab =

- Rural commune and town
- Interactive map of Lahlaf M'Zab
- Country: Morocco
- Region: Casablanca-Settat
- Province: Settat

Population (2004)
  - Total: 7,160
- Time zone: UTC+0 (GMT)

Lahlaf M'Zab is a small town and former rural commune in Settat Province of the Casablanca-Settat region of Morocco. At the time of the 2004 census, the commune had a total population of 7160 people living in 1059 households.

the commune was merged with Ain Dorbane into Ain Dorbane-Lahlaf.
