= Ain Dorbane =

- Rural commune and town
- Location within Morocco
- Country: Morocco
- Region: Casablanca-Settat
- Province: Settat

Population (2004)
  - Total: 13,074
- Time zone: UTC+0 (GMT)

Ain Dorbane is a small town and rural commune in Settat Province of the Casablanca-Settat region of Morocco. At the time of the 2004 census, the commune had a total population of 13,074 people living in 2064 households.

The commune was merged with Lahlaf M'Zab into Ain Dorbane-Lahlaf.
