= Oulad M'Hamed =

Oulad M'Hamed ⵡⵍⴰⴷ ⵎⵃⴰⵎⴷ أولاد امحمد
- Rural commune and town
- Location within Morocco
- Country: Morocco
- Region: Casablanca-Settat
- Province: Settat

Population (2004)
  - Total: 10,844
- Time zone: UTC+0 (GMT)

Oulad M'Hamed is a small town and rural commune in Settat Province of the Casablanca-Settat region of Morocco. At the time of the 2004 census, the commune had a total population of 10844 people living in 1663 households.
