= M'Garto =

- Rural commune and town
- Location within Morocco
- Coordinates: 33.18°N 7.16°W
- Country: Morocco
- Region: Casablanca-Settat
- Province: Settat

Population (2004)
  - Total: 8,827
- Time zone: UTC+0 (GMT)

M'Garto is a small town and rural commune in Settat Province of the Casablanca-Settat region of Morocco. At the time of the 2004 census, the commune had a total population of 8827 people living in 1554 households.
