= Oued Naanaa =

Coordinates: 33°01′N 7°20′W

- Rural commune and town
- Interactive map of Oued Naanaa
- Country: Morocco
- Region: Casablanca-Settat
- Province: Settat

Population (2004)
  - Total: 7,126
- Time zone: UTC+0 (GMT)

Oued Naanaa is a small town and rural commune in Settat Province of the Casablanca-Settat region of Morocco. At the time of the 2004 census, the commune had a total population of 7126 people living in 1158 households. It is mainly owned by the ' El Harkati ' Family which owns the vast majority of the wealth there (Houses, Land ...)
