= Oulad Fares =

Coordinates: 35°31′N 5°56′W

Oulad Fares أولاد فارس
- Rural commune and town
- Interactive map of Oulad Fares
- Country: Morocco
- Region: Casablanca-Settat
- Province: Settat

Population (2004)
  - Total: 11,961
- Time zone: UTC+0 (GMT)

Oulad Fares is a small town and rural commune in Settat Province of the Casablanca-Settat region of Morocco. At the time of the 2004 census, the commune had a total population of 11,961 people living in 1812 households.
