= N'Khila =

- Rural commune and town
- Interactive map of N'Khila
- Coordinates: 32°57′26″N 7°04′23″W
- Country: Morocco
- Region: Casablanca-Settat
- Province: Settat

Population (2004)
  - Total: 11,503
- Time zone: UTC+0 (GMT)

N'Khila is a small town and rural commune in Settat Province of the Casablanca-Settat region of Morocco. At the time of the 2004 census, the commune had a total population of 11,503 people living in 1753 households.
