= Oulad Chbana =

Oulad Chbana أولاد شبانة
- Rural commune and town
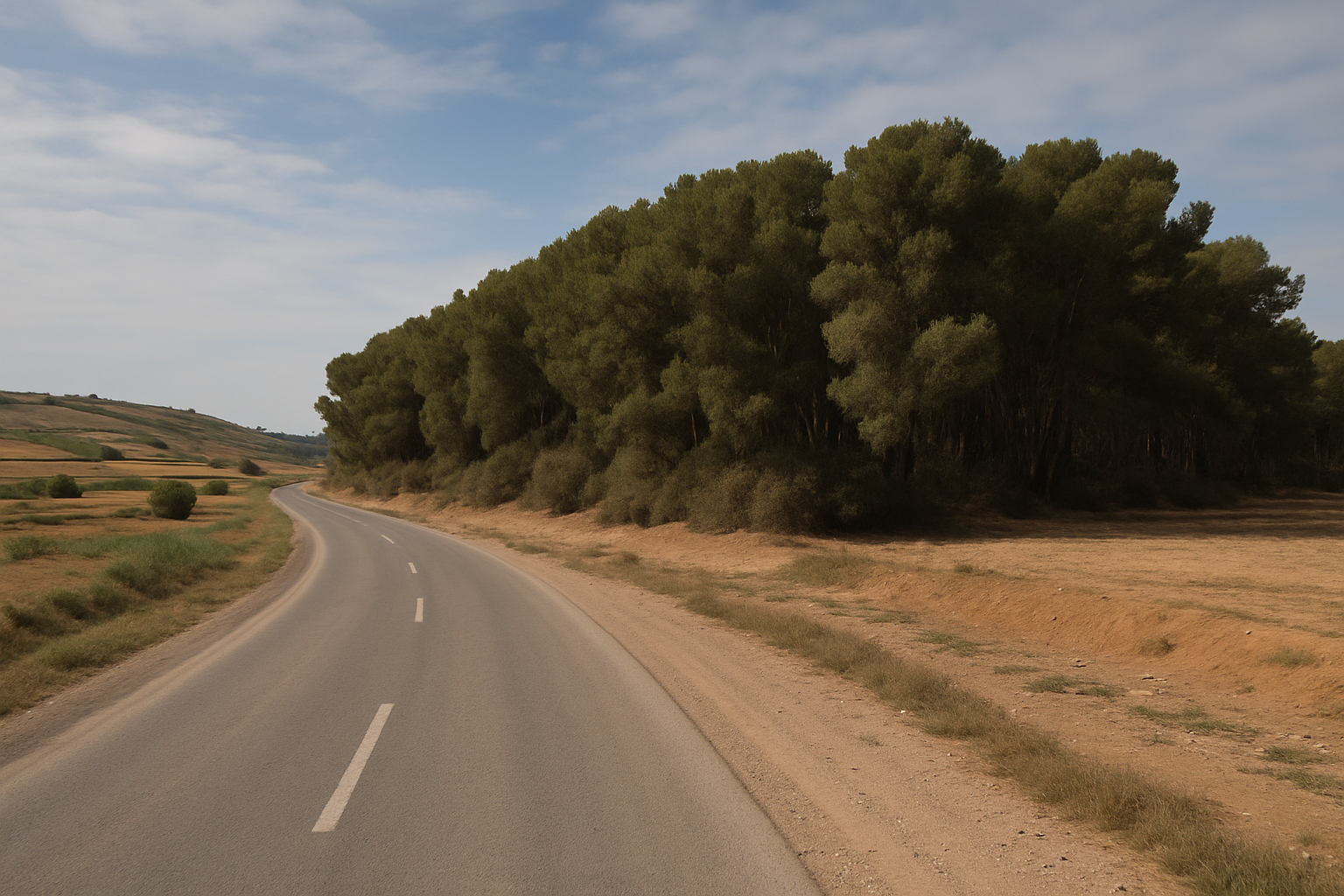
- View of Oulad Chbana

- Location in Morocco
- Coordinates: 33°02′57″N 7°22′57″W
- Country: Morocco
- Region: Casablanca-Settat
- Province: Settat

Area
  - Total: 58.54 km^{2} (22.60 sq mi)
- Elevation: 370 m (1,210 ft)

Population (2014)
  - Total: 8,081
  - Density: 138.0/km^{2} (357.5/sq mi)
- Time zone: WET (UTC +0)
  - Summer (DST): WEST (UTC +1)

Oulad Chbana (Arabic: أولاد شبانة, Standard Moroccan Tamazight: ⵓⵍⴰⴷ ⵛⴱⴰⵏⴰ) is a small town and rural commune in Settat Province of the Casablanca-Settat region in central Morocco.

== Geography ==
Oulad Chbana lies on the Chaouia plateau at roughly 370 m above sea level, about 25 km southwest of the city of Settat and 80 km south of Casablanca. The surrounding landscape is gently rolling, with cereal fields and olive groves dominating the local land use.

== Administration ==
The commune is part of the Settat Province (ISO code 06.461) within the Casablanca-Settat region. It is one of 17 rural communes in the province’s Circle of El Borouj.

== Demographics ==
At the time of the 2004 census, Oulad Chbana had 7,925 inhabitants in 1,195 households. By the 2014 national census, the population had risen to 8,081 residents living in 1,319 households, of whom 47.9 % were female and 52.1 % male. The average household size was about 6.1 persons.

=== Historical population ===
Year	Pop.
1994	7,452
2004	7,925
2014	8,081

== Economy ==
Agriculture is the mainstay of the local economy, with wheat, barley and olives as principal crops. Small-scale livestock (sheep and goats) and poultry farming also contribute to household incomes.

== Infrastructure ==
Oulad Chbana is linked by regional roads to Settat (P 2002) and neighbouring communes. The nearest major highway is the A7 Casablanca–Marrakesh, accessible at Settat. There is a primary school and a health centre; secondary schooling and hospital services are in Settat.

== Culture and Society ==
The commune is predominantly Muslim; local life revolves around the weekly souk (market) and seasonal agricultural festivals. Traditional Chaouia music and dance are still practised at family and community events.

== Gallery ==
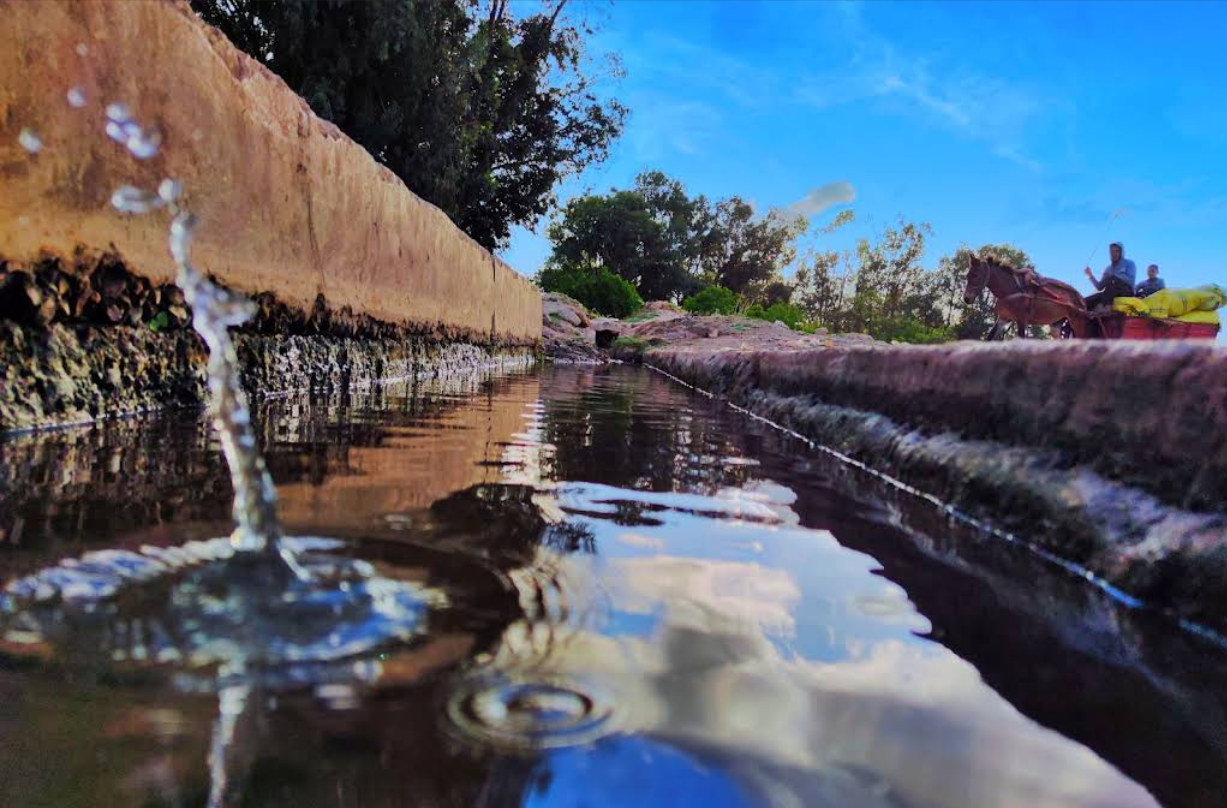
Agricultural area in Oulad Chbana

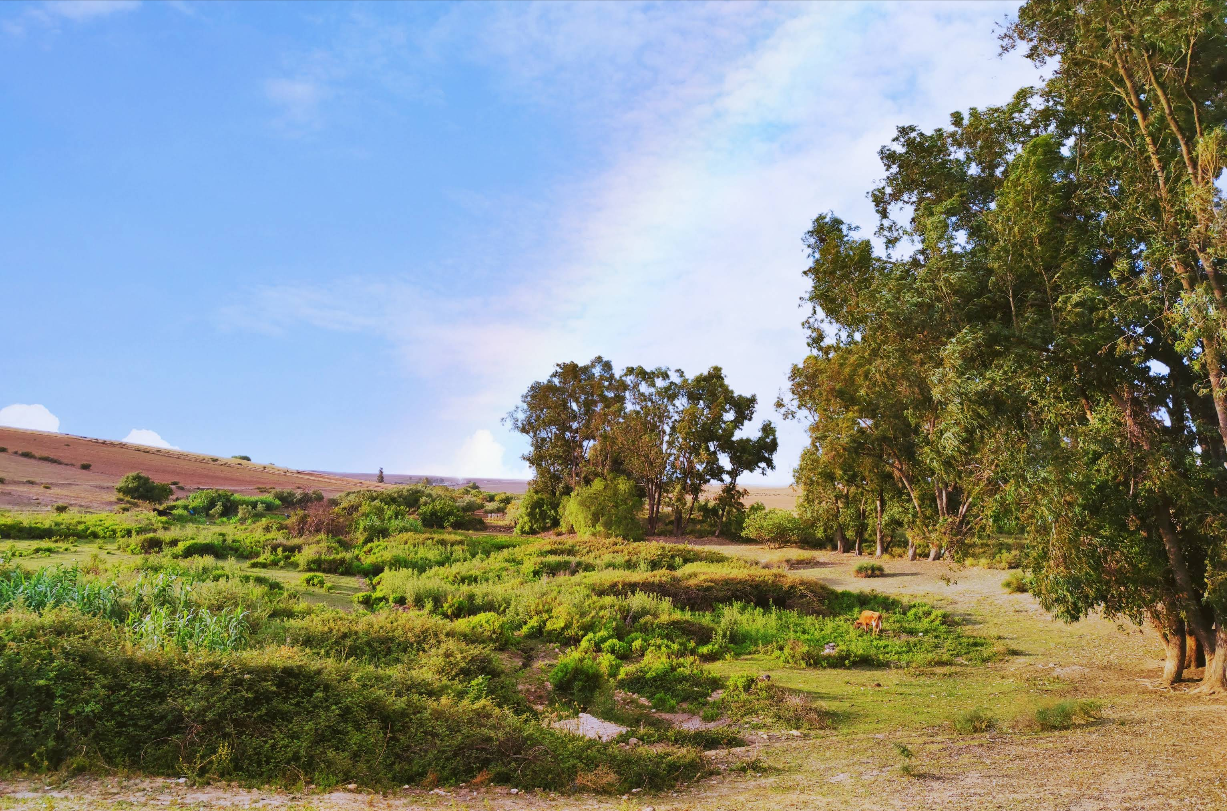
Forested area surrounding the town
