= Mniaa =

Coordinates: 32°52′00″N 7°15′38″W

- Rural commune and town
- Interactive map of Mniaa
- Country: Morocco
- Region: Casablanca-Settat
- Province: Settat

Population (2004)
  - Total: 11,249
- Time zone: UTC+0 (GMT)

Mniaa is a small town and rural commune in Settat Province of the Casablanca-Settat region of Morocco. At the time of the 2004 census, the commune had a total population of 11249 people living in 1618 households.
