= Mrizigue =

- Rural commune and town
- Interactive map of Mrizigue
- Country: Morocco
- Region: Casablanca-Settat
- Province: Settat

Population (2004)
  - Total: 8,876
- Time zone: UTC+0 (GMT)

Mrizigue is a small town and rural commune in Settat Province of the Casablanca-Settat region of Morocco. At the time of the 2004 census, the commune had a total population of 8876 people living in 1252 households.
