= Bouchaib Benlabsir =

Moroccan politician (1931-1991

Bouchaib Benlabsir MP

Personal details
- Born: 27 June 1931
- Died: 4 December 1991 (aged 60); Toulouse, France
- Political party: Independent

Bouchaib Benlabsir (27 June 1931 – 4 December 1991) was a Moroccan politician. In 1977, Benlabsir was elected to the Parliament of Morocco, representing the Settat constituency as an independent. He received 84.02% of the votes for his district. Benlabsir died on 4 December 1991 in Toulouse, France.
