= Oulad M'Rah =

Coordinates: 32°54′27″N 7°15′36″W

Oulad MRah Mzaab
- Town
- Interactive map of Oulad MRah
- Country: Morocco
- Region: Casablanca-Settat
- Province: Settat

Population (2004)
  - Total: 9,166
- Time zone: UTC+0 (GMT)

Oulad M'Rah is a town in Settat Province, Casablanca-Settat, Morocco. According to the 2008 census it has a population of 9,166.
