= Ras El Ain, Morocco =

Coordinates: 32°59′N 7°24′W

Ras El Ain رأس العين
- Town
- Interactive map of Ras El Ain
- Country: Morocco
- Region: Casablanca-Settat
- Province: Settat
- Elevation: 537 m (1,762 ft)

Population (2014)
  - Total: 3,614
- Time zone: UTC+0 (GMT)

Ras El Ain is a town in Settat Province, Casablanca-Settat, Morocco. According to the 2004 census, it had a population of 3,638.
