= Guisser =

- Town
- Location within Morocco
- Coordinates: 32°46′N 7°30′W
- Country: Morocco
- Region: Casablanca-Settat
- Province: Settat

Population (2004)
  - Total: 11,339
- Time zone: UTC+0 (GMT)

Guisser is a village and rural commune in Settat Province, Casablanca-Settat, Morocco. According to the 2004 census it has a population of 11,339.
