= El Borouj =

El Borouj: البروج (Arabic)
- Town
- Location in Morocco El Borouj (Africa)
- Coordinates: 32.5050°N 7.1927°W
- Country: Morocco
- Region: Casablanca-Settat
- Province: Settat

Population (2004)
  - Total: 16,222
- Time zone: UTC+0 (GMT)

El Borouj (Arabic: البروج, romanized: al-burūj) is a town in Settat Province, Casablanca-Settat, Morocco. According to the 2004 census, it has a population of 16,222.
