= Khouribga Province =

Province of Morocco

Coordinates: 32°53′N 6°54′W

Khouribga Province إقليم خريبكة ⵜⴰⵙⴳⴰ ⵏ ⵅⵕⵉⴱⴳⴰ
- Province
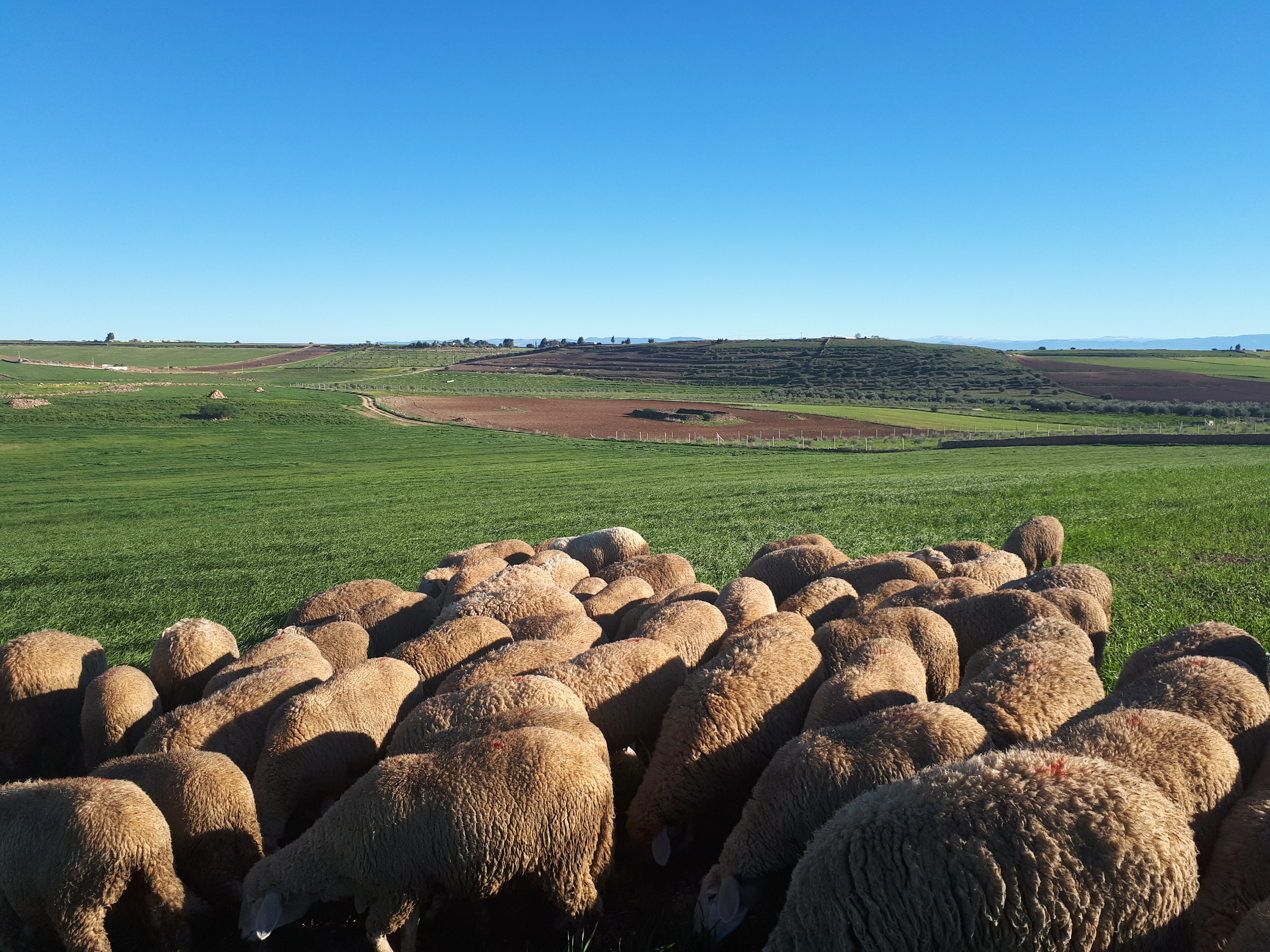
- Interactive map of Khouribga Province
- Country: Morocco
- Region: Béni Mellal-Khénifra
- Seat: Khouribga

Population (2024)
  - Total: 525,145

Khouribga (Arabic: خريبكة, Standard Moroccan Tamazight: ⵅⵕⵉⴱⴳⴰ) is a province of Morocco in the region of Béni Mellal-Khénifra. It has a population of 525,145 people as of the 2024 census. the Province is historically known as Ouardigha, a dominant tribal confederation in the area.

The city of Khouribga is the namesake and capital of the Province.

The Ouled Abdoun Basin partially located in the Province contains the largest phosphate reserves in the world.

The major cities are:

- Bejaad
- Khouribga
- Oued Zem

== Economy ==
=== Phosphate ===
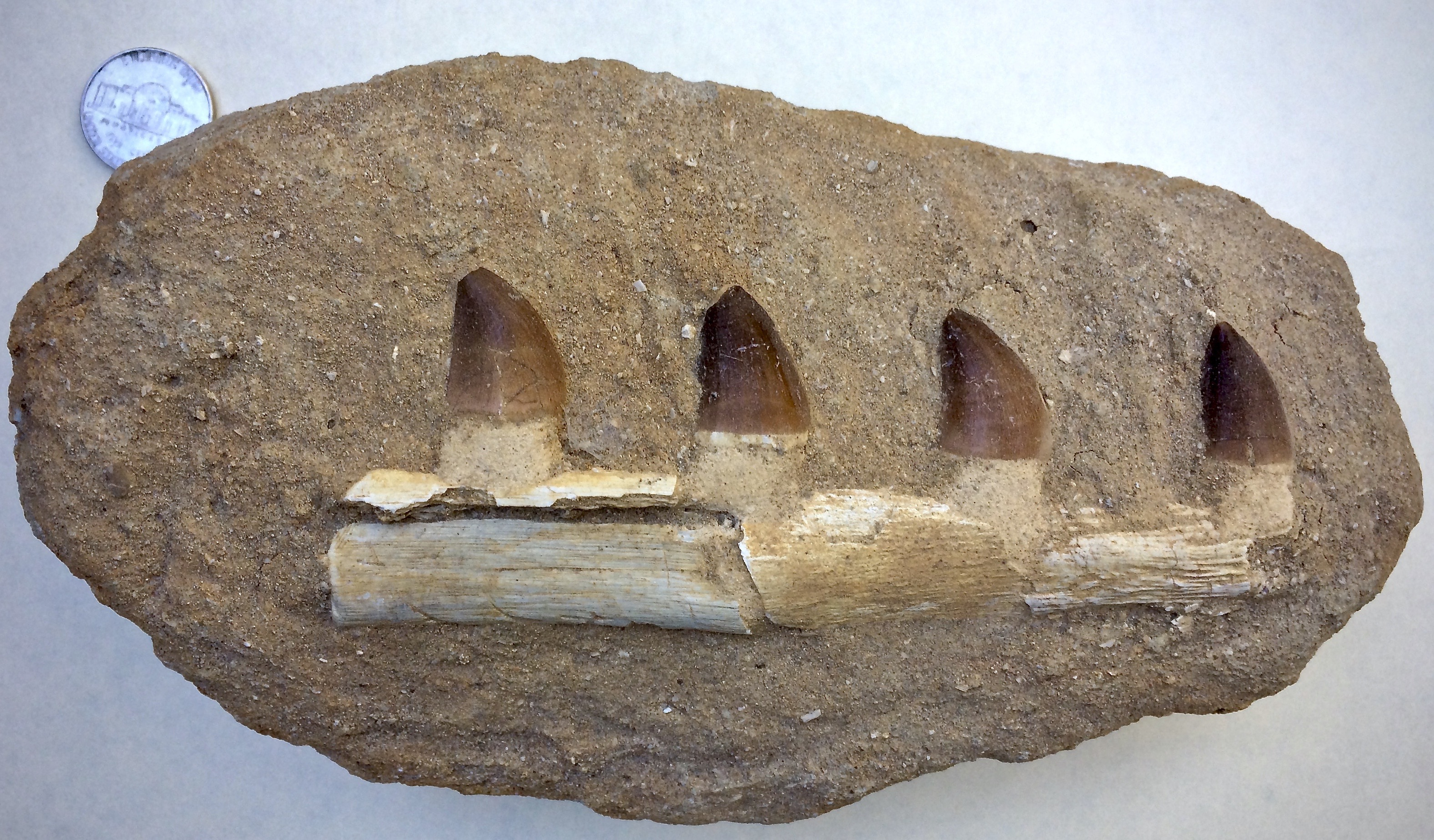
Partial mosasaur jaw from a Khouribga mine, cf. Mosasaurus beaugei

The Province of Khouribga has a large phosphate reserve estimated 35 to 40 billion cubic meters, which has been mined since 1920s and is ranked first at the international level.

The phosphate mines in the Ouled Abdoun Basin are a notable source of fossils, especially Mosasaur and Sharks jaws and teeth.

=== Industrial activities ===
In addition to phosphate mining, the province has seen the emergence of other industries in economic sectors such as:

- Electrical and electronics industry
- Chemical industry
- Food Industry
- Mechanical Industry
- Textiles

=== Industrial areas ===
The province has three Industrial zones:

- The industrial zone of Khouribga (industrial district): 20 hectares (234 partitions) and 13 operating industrial units plus the expansion of the zone.
- The industrial zone of Oued Zem.
- The industrial zone of Bejaad.

=== Services ===
The province has several services, among them:

- 25 bank agencies
- 6 insurance agencies
- 7 travel agencies
- 2 railways with daily trips with a project to build a modern station.

=== Agriculture ===
The agricultural land is divided into 50% arable land, 20% forests, 30% unused land. Livestock is the most important source of income for the rural population, the herd is estimated to be:

- Goats: 30.000-60.000 heads
- Equidae: 40.000-60.000 heads
- Cows: 50.000-70.000 heads
- Sheep: 500.000-600.000 heads

=== Handicrafts ===
The handicrafts sector represents a sizable part of the local economy with 9 cooperatives (260 members), and a handicrafts association.

== Health ==
The facilities cover most of the province with:

- 6 rooms
- 3 provincial hospitals
- 20 health centers
- 7 urban health centers
- 9 rural clinics

== Subdivisions ==
The province is divided administratively into the following:

Name	Geographic code	Type	Households	Population (2004)	Foreign population	Moroccan population	Notes
Bejaad	311.01.01.	Municipality	8728	40513	7	40506	
Boujniba	311.01.03.	Municipality	2993	15041	2	15039	
Hattane	311.01.05.	Municipality	2055	10284	0	10284	
Khouribga	311.01.07.	Municipality	33519	166397	75	166322	
Oued Zem	311.01.09.	Municipality	17387	83970	24	83946	
Ain Kaicher	311.03.01.	Rural commune	882	5008	0	5008	
Bni Bataou	311.03.03.	Rural commune	911	5660	0	5660	
Bni Zrantel	311.03.05.	Rural commune	1213	7084	0	7084	
Boukhrisse	311.03.07.	Rural commune	893	5694	0	5694	
Chougrane	311.03.09.	Rural commune	1288	8113	0	8113	
Oulad Gouaouch	311.03.11.	Rural commune	548	3094	0	3094	
Rouached	311.03.13.	Rural commune	692	4720	0	4720	
Tachrafat	311.03.15.	Rural commune	628	3417	0	3417	
Bir Mezoui	311.05.01.	Rural commune	1190	6604	1	6603	
Bni Ykhlef	311.05.03.	Rural commune	1606	9553	0	9553	
Boulanouare	311.05.05.	Rural commune	2644	13736	3	13733	10469 residents live in the center, called Boulanouare; 3267 residents live in rural areas.
Lagfaf	311.05.07.	Rural commune	1499	8250	0	8250	
El Foqra	311.05.09.	Rural commune	661	4211	0	4211	
M'Fassis	311.05.11.	Rural commune	1069	5619	2	5617	
Oulad Abdoune	311.05.13.	Rural commune	2254	14690	0	14690	
Oulad Azzouz	311.05.15.	Rural commune	1498	9434	0	9434	
Ait Ammar	311.07.01.	Rural commune	823	4594	0	4594	
Bni Smir	311.07.03.	Rural commune	1434	7766	0	7766	
Braksa	311.07.05.	Rural commune	1242	7334	0	7334	
Kasbat Troch	311.07.07.	Rural commune	1355	8699	0	8699	
Lagnadiz	311.07.09.	Rural commune	1166	7338	5	7333	
Maadna	311.07.11.	Rural commune	1053	6283	0	6283	
Oulad Aissa	311.07.13.	Rural commune	978	6148	0	6148	
Oulad Boughadi	311.07.15.	Rural commune	1563	8661	0	8661	
Oulad Fennane	311.07.17.	Rural commune	1423	8465	0	8465	
Oulad Ftata	311.07.19.	Rural commune	448	2764	0	2764	

Kouribga
