= Loulad =

Loulad لولاد ⵍⵓⵍⴰⴷ Lulad
- Town
- Location within Morocco
- Coordinates: 32°59′0″N 7°8′0″W
- Country: Morocco
- Region: Casablanca-Settat
- Province: Settat
- Elevation: 759 m (2,490 ft)

Population (2004)
  - Total: 5,025
- Time zone: UTC+0 (GMT)

Loulad (Arabic: لولاد) is a town in Morocco. It is situated in the region of Casablanca-Settat.

== See also ==
=== Sources ===
- (in French) Loulad at the site of World Gazetteer, by Stefan Helders
- (in English) Loulad on the site of Falling Rain Genomics, Inc.
