= Settat =

Settat سطات (Arabic) ⵚⵟⵟⴰⵜ (Standard Moroccan Tamazight)
- Municipality and city
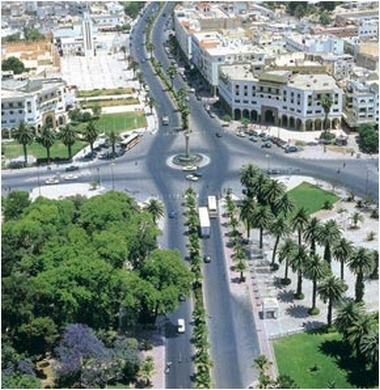
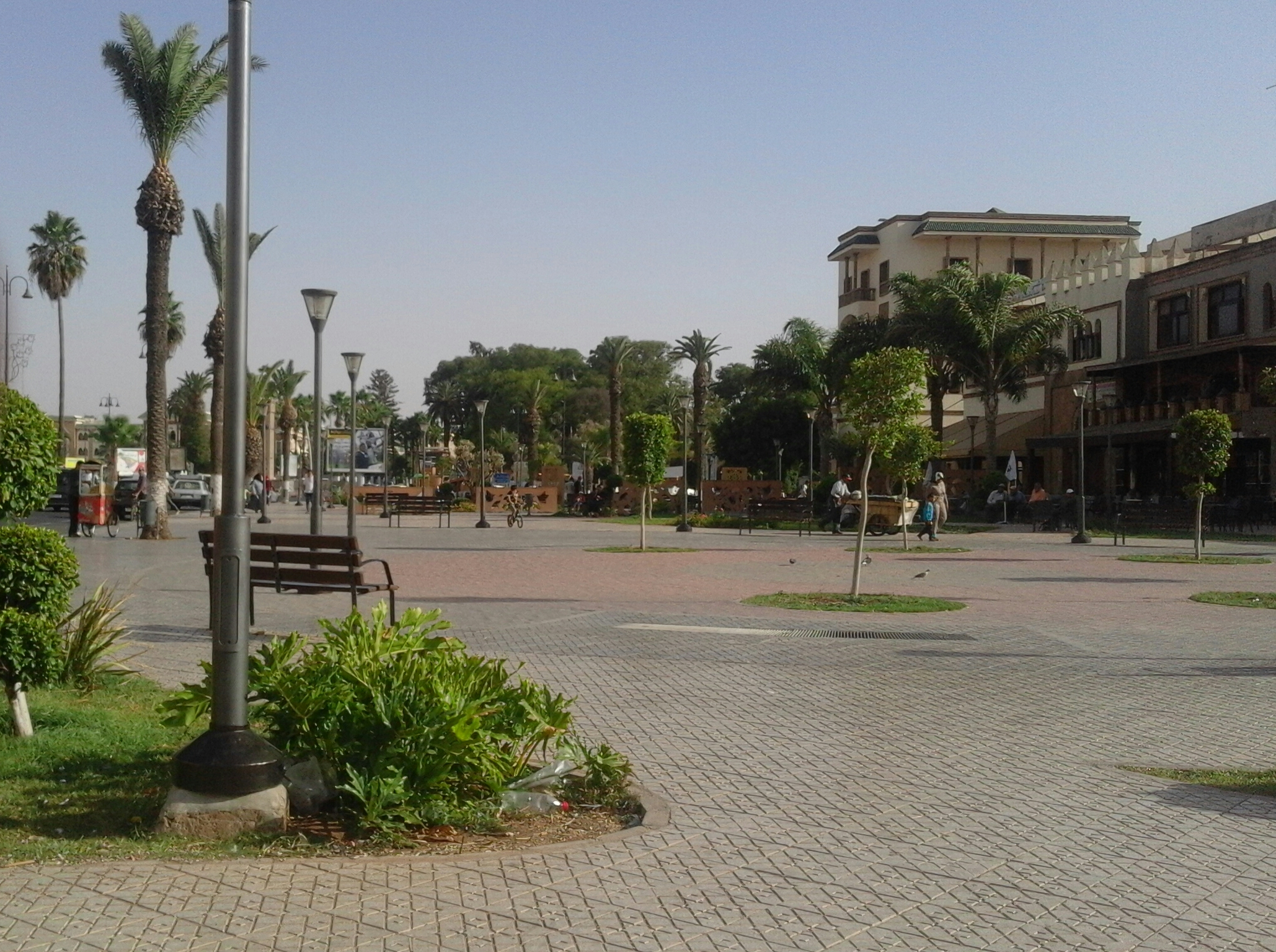
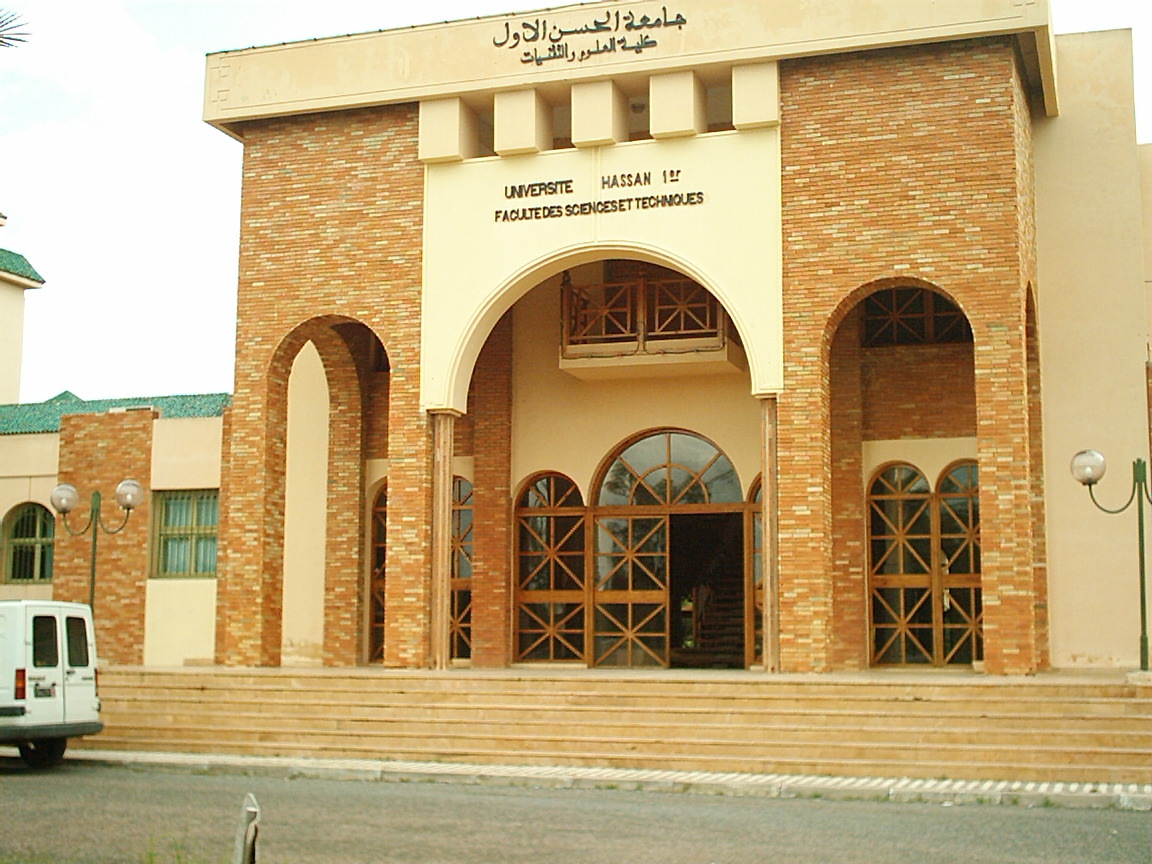
- Interactive map of Settat
- Coordinates: 33°0′N 7°37′W
- Country: Morocco
- Region: Casablanca-Settat
- Province: Settat
- Elevation: 370 m (1,210 ft)

Population (2024)
  - Total: 171,556
  - Rank: 21nd in Morocco
- Time zone: UTC+0 (GMT)

Settat (Note: Arabic: سطات, romanized: siṭṭāt Standard Moroccan Tamazight: ⵚⵟⵟⴰⵜ) is a city in Morocco between the national capital Rabat and Marrakesh. Settat is located 83.9 km (52.1 mi) by road south of the centre of Casablanca, roughly an hour's drive. It lies about 40 km (25 mi) north of Ben Ahmed and 34 km (21 mi) south of Berrechid. It is the capital of Settat Province and is its largest city in both size and population. According to the 2024 Moroccan census, it had a population of 171,556 people.

Settat is 370 m (1,210 ft) above sea level, built on a plateau surrounded by foothills in all directions. The landmarks of Settat include the 17th century Ismailia Kasbah.

== History ==
By choosing to build the Kasbah on the hilly site of Settat, 18th century Moroccan ruler Moulay Ismail would trigger the process of urbanization. Indeed, the building of the Kasbah brought order and security for travelers and residents supported the settlements near it. Moreover, by installing the first Caïd in the region which previously depended Caïd Doukkali and Rahmani, Moulay Ismail formalized Settat status as capital of this region.

Settat became an administrative center in the early 18th century, due to its strategic position as an unavoidable passage between North and South. Thanks to the richness of the soil, it also prospered during the 18th and 19th centuries as an important trading center for agricultural products, attracting entrepreneurs. This was the case for Moroccan Jews who settled here en masse in the 19th century, building their own neighborhood, the Mellah, near the Kasbah.

This development was disrupted in the early 20th century during the early chaos of the French colonization when the Chaouia tribes rallied to Moulay Hafid. However, under the French protectorate, the city of Settat had unprecedented urban development, as evidenced by the population boom it experienced from 1913 to 1925. This prosperity lasted until the early fifties when, as a result of the development of Casablanca, communications, and transportation, the city of Settat and other towns in the region have entered a period of semi-lethargy.

In the early 1990s, Settat was endowed with a university L'Université Hassan 1er de Settat, an international golf course, and a racetrack. Settat has undergone large-scale urban planning from the 1970s to become an important regional center. Settat is linked to Casablanca (57 km [35 mi] to the north) since 2001 by the A7 highway, and Marrakesh (146 km [91 mi] to the south) since 2007.

== Etymology ==
The name Settat comes from "Ayt Settat" a Senhaja-Berber clan of the Houara tribe. They belonged to the Masmuda-led Almohad alliance according to al-Baydaq, Ibn Hazm and Ibn Khaldun. Their origin is south-east of the High-Atlas and they seemingly settled in the Chaouia region as a result of the Almohad advance to the north.

== Notable people ==
- David Amar (1920–2000), Jewish businessman
- Jo Amar (1930–2009), Jewish singer
- Bouchaib Benlabsir (1931–1991), deputy mayor of Settat
- Driss Basri (1938–2007), politician, Minister of Interior in 1979–1999
- Habib Mazini (born 1954), academic and writer
- Yahya Jabrane (born 1991), footballer
- Abdel Abqar (born 1999), footballer

== Sister cities ==
Settat is twinned with:

- La Celle-Saint-Cloud, France
- Yinchuan, China

== Gallery ==
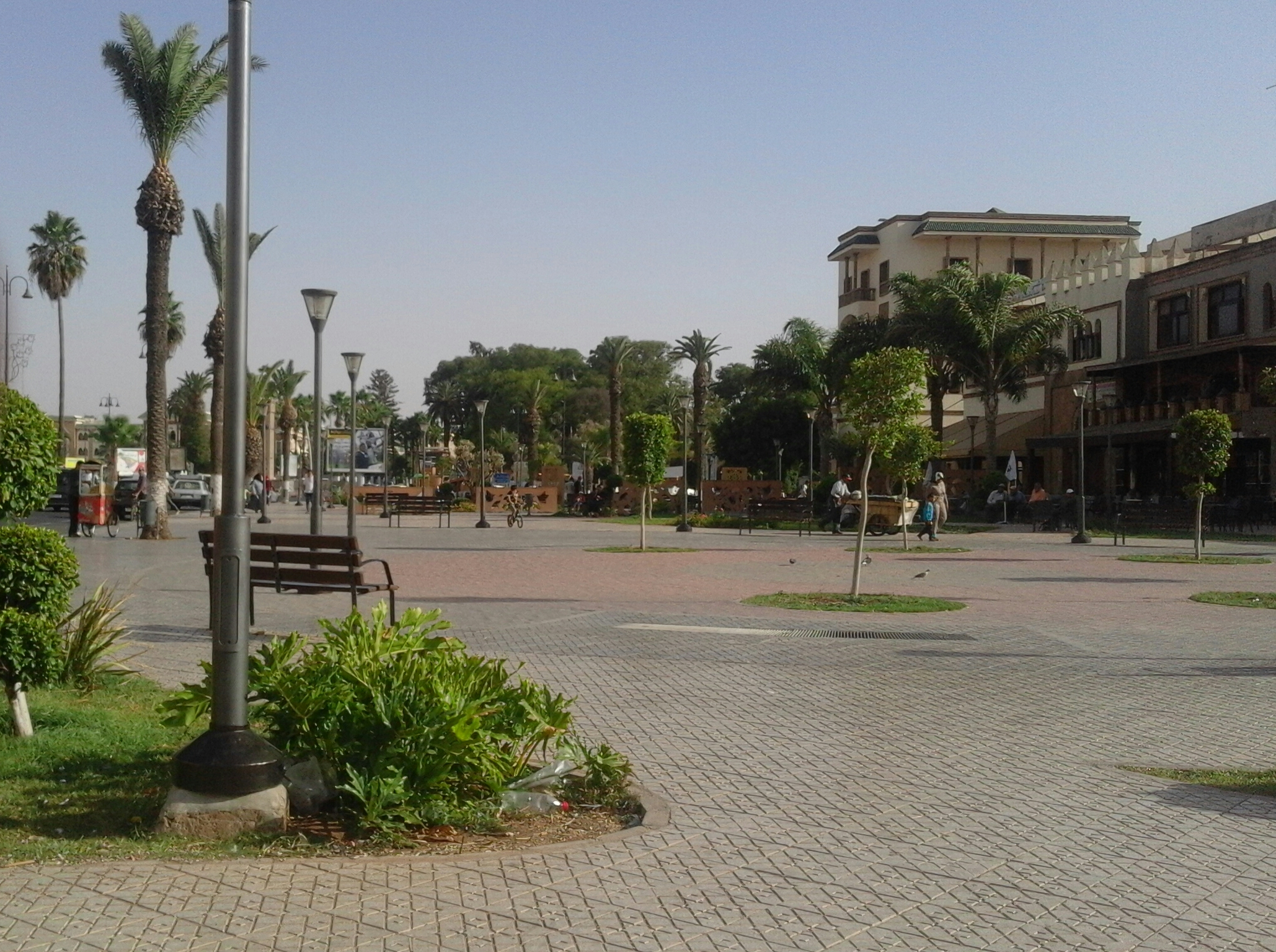
