= Oulad Said =

Coordinates: 32.9676°N 7.8133°W

Oulad Said أولاد سعيد
- Town
- The commune of Oulad Said is served by Route Naionale 11
- Interactive map of Oulad Said
- Country: Morocco
- Region: Casablanca-Settat
- Province: Settat

Population (2004)
  - Total: 2,396
- Time zone: UTC+0 (GMT)

Oulad Said is a town and rural commune in Settat Province, Casablanca-Settat, Morocco. According to the 2004 census it had a population of 2,396.
