= Ben Ahmed =

Ben Ahmed بن أحمد El Aalwa
- City
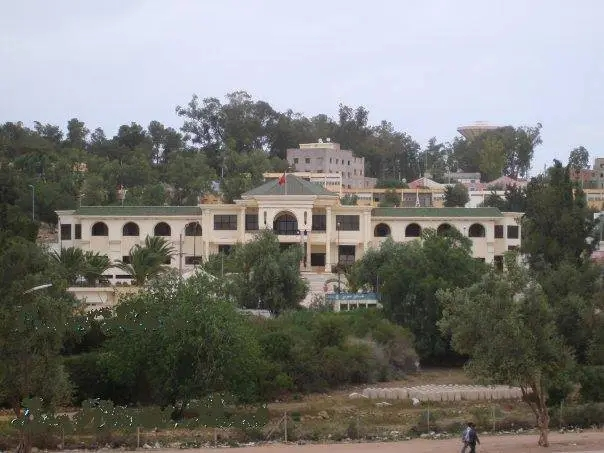
- A grand city hall resembling a miniature model of the White House

- Location in Morocco
- Coordinates: 33.0655°N 7.2464°W
- Country: Morocco
- Region: Casablanca-Settat
- Province: Settat

Area
  - Total: 3.09 km^{2} (1.19 sq mi)
- Elevation: 642 m (2,106 ft)

Population (2014)
  - Total: 31,846
- Time zone: UTC+0 (GMT)

Ben Ahmed (Moroccan Arabic: بن أحمد) is a city in Settat Province, Casablanca-Settat, Morocco. According to the 2014 census it has a population of 31,846. The city is located between Berrechid and Khouribga, about 39 km from each of them. It is also 40 km from Settat and around 70 km from Casablanca.

In the 1950s, Samuel-Daniel Levy and the Council of Jewish Communities of Morocco established the Sanatorium Israélite Ben Ahmed, a sanatorium dedicated to Jewish patients with tuberculosis in Ben Ahmed.
