= Boujniba =

- Town
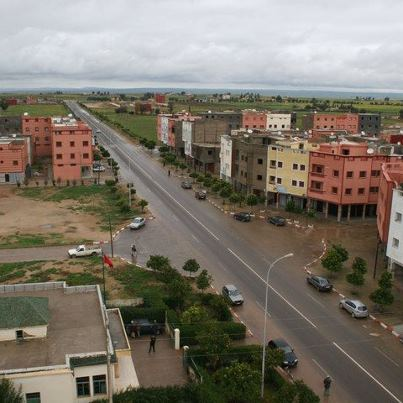
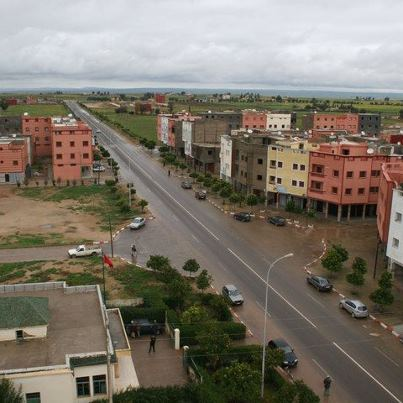
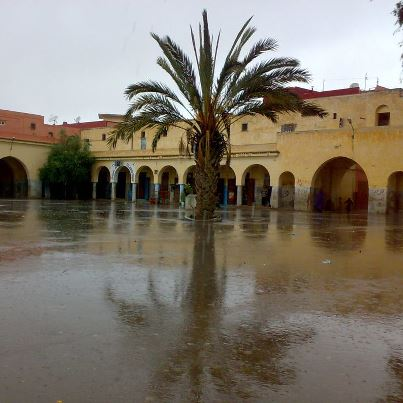
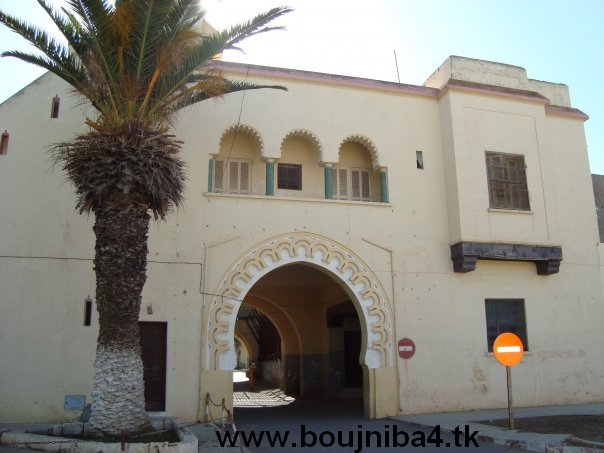
- Interactive map of Boujniba
- Coordinates: 32°54′N 06°47′W
- Country: Morocco
- Region: Béni Mellal-Khénifra
- Province: Khouribga

Population (2004)
  - Total: 15,041
- Time zone: UTC+0 (GMT)

Boujniba is a town in Khouribga Province, Béni Mellal-Khénifra, Morocco. According to the 2004 census it has a population of 15,041.
