= Oued Zem =

Oued Zem وادي زم
- City
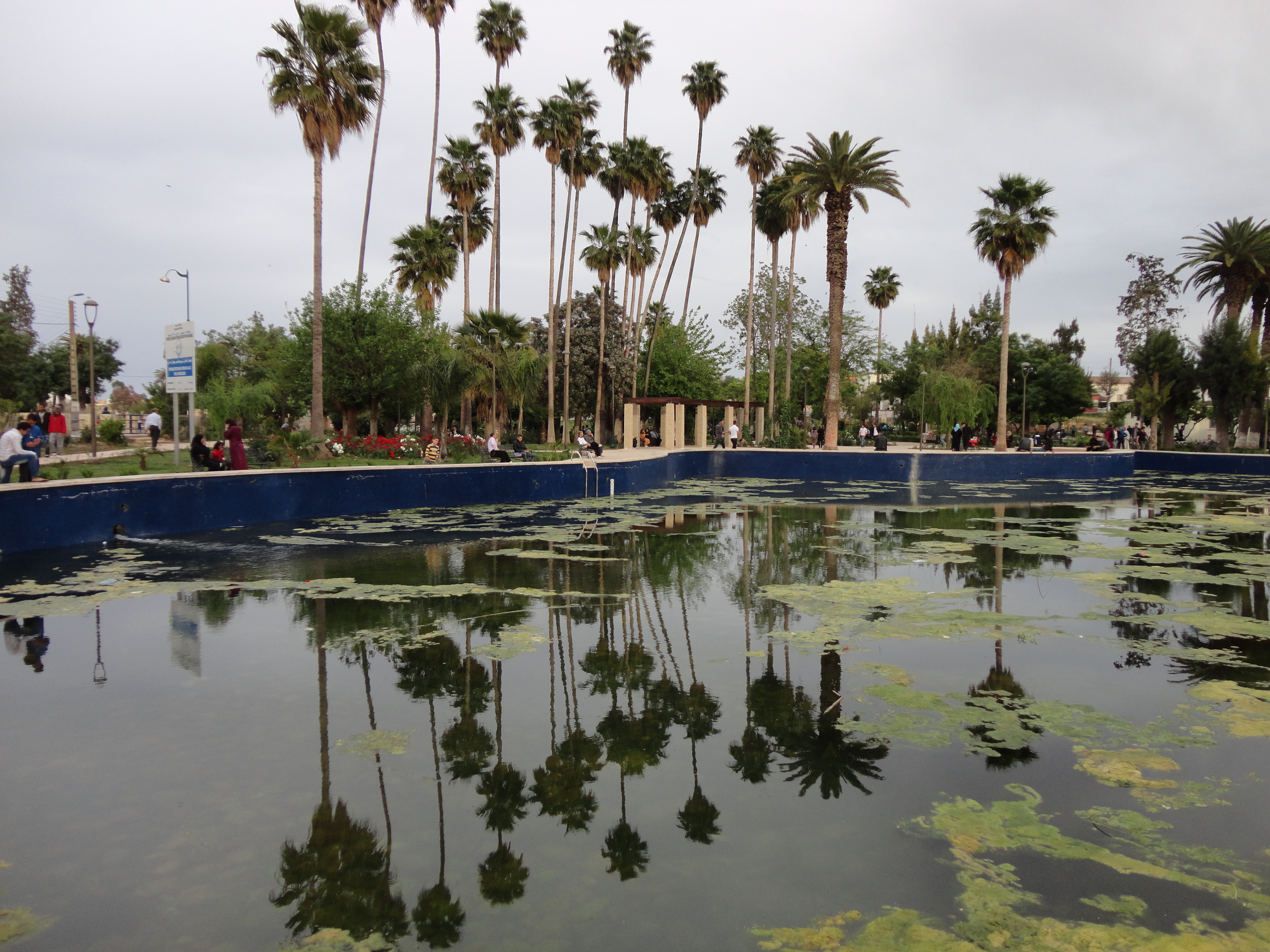
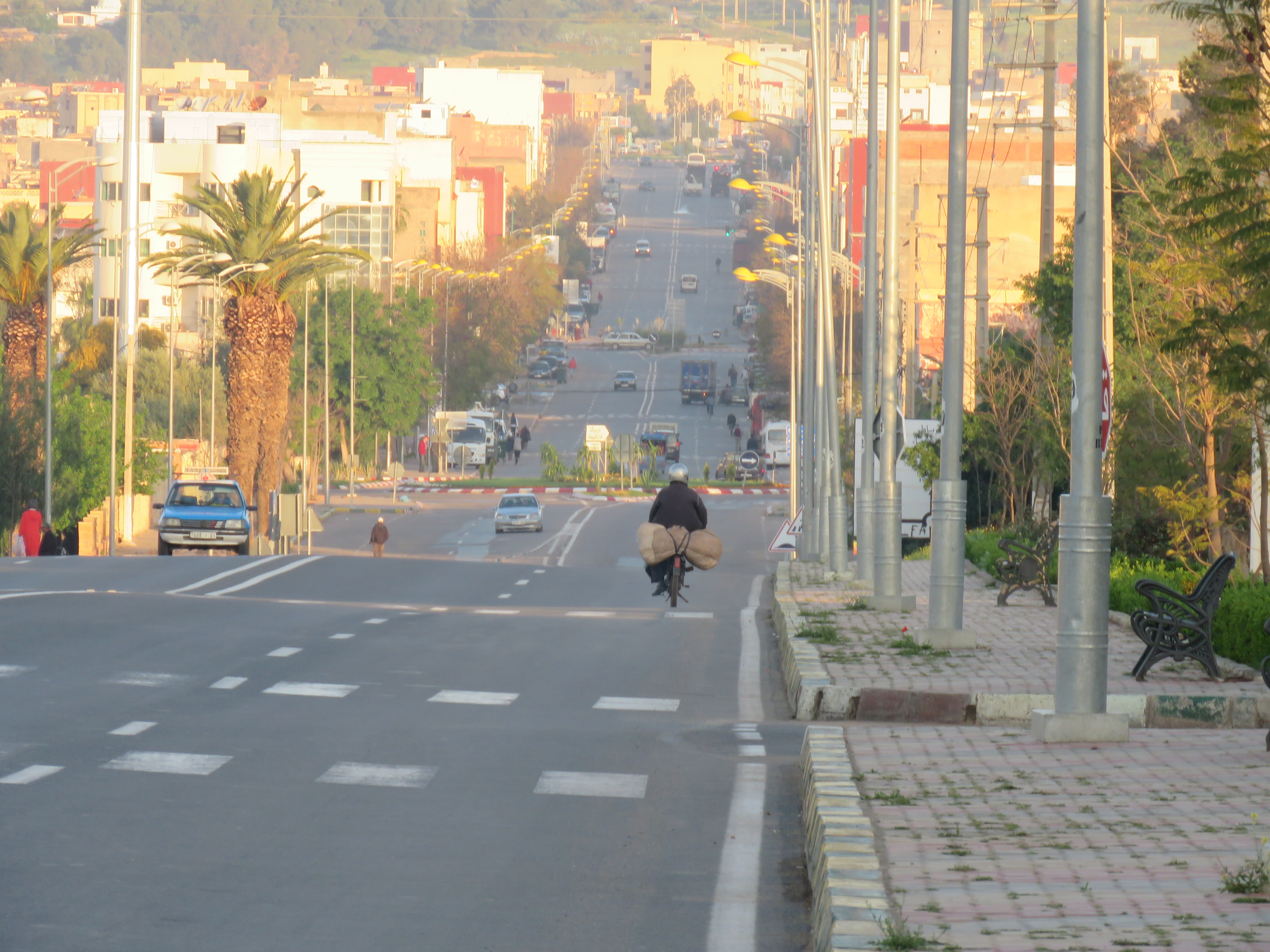
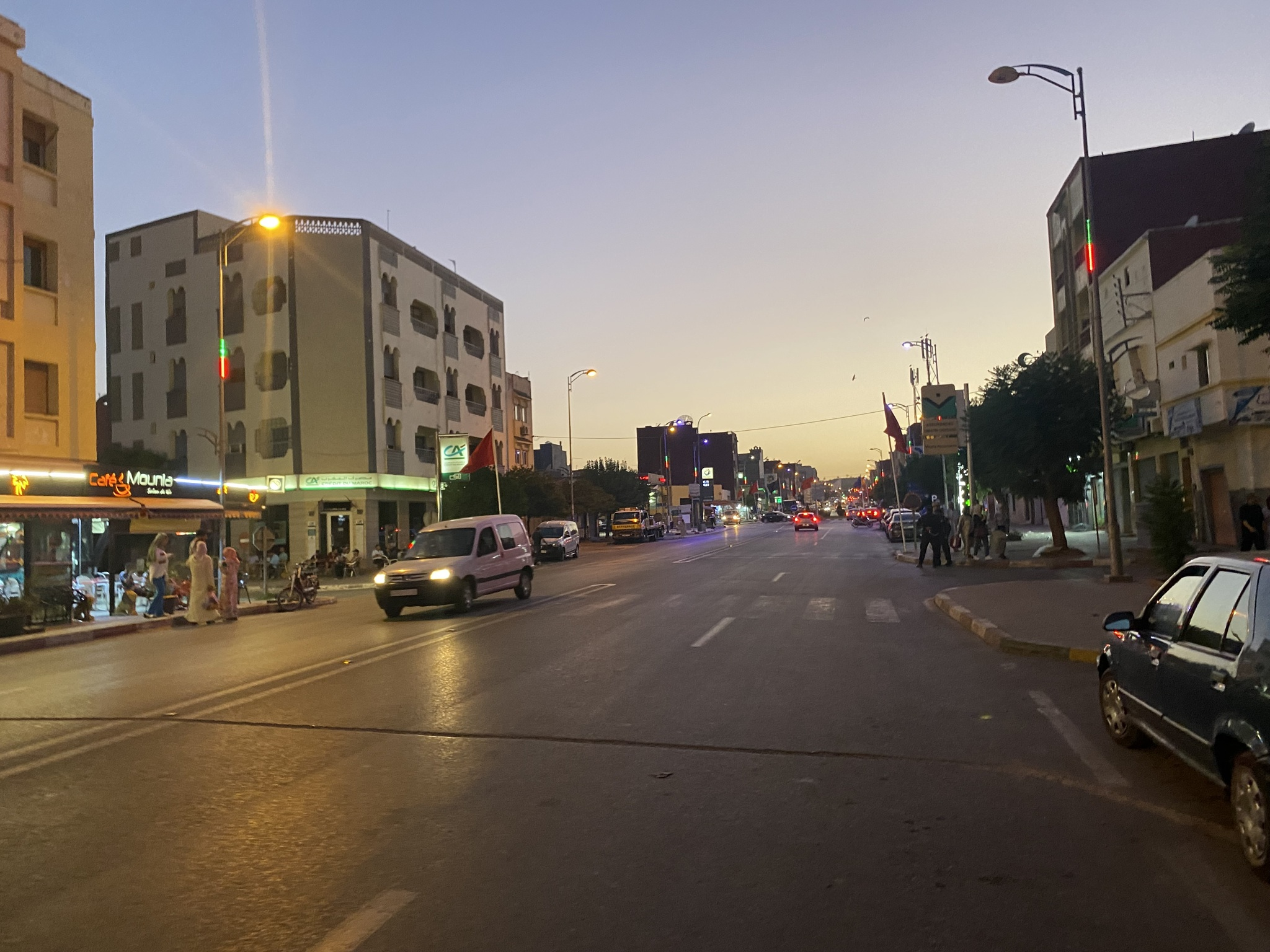
- Nickname: City of Martyrs
- Interactive map of Oued Zem
- Coordinates: 32°52′N 6°34′W
- Country: Morocco
- Region: Béni Mellal-Khénifra
- Province: Khouribga

Population (2014)
  - Total: 95,267
- Time zone: UTC+0 (GMT)
- Postal code: 25350

Oued Zem (Arabic: وادي زم, romanized: Wādī Zem) is a city in Khouribga Province, Béni Mellal-Khénifra, Morocco. According to the 2014 Moroccan census, Oued Zem had a population of 95,267.

The city is rich in phosphate, iron and marble.

== History ==
The name of the city is made up of two words: Oued, an Arabic word which indicates the river and Zem, an Amazigh word which means lion, in reference to the river and the lion (Lion of the Atlas) which frightened people who walked there. For this reason, they named this region Oued Zem, or the river of the lion.

The first railway was erected there in 1917, during the discovery of phosphate for the first time in Morocco by the colonizer at the time to export it abroad. The French called Oued Zem "Little Paris," and they built a lake in the shape of a map of France, which is still to this day. The city played a major role in Morocco's independence thanks to the ferocity of its resistance.

In recent times, Oued Zem has become infamous for an online financial scam in which victims are lured into online sexual encounters and blackmailed for money, under the threat of exposure. As a result of this, the city has been called the capital of the "sextortion" industry.

== Background ==
This nascent city began to bear the name “Oued Zem” since the French protectorate over Morocco, and it was taken as a strategic location to resist the Tadla and Atlas regions, in addition to being a point of supply from Al-Ain water (a source of water, as a lake arose in this place later to Today, it is an outlet for the inhabitants of Oued Zem, near which a military barracks was built near the "Zarda" valley. And Al-Ain was replaced by the inauguration of a lake in order to pressure the tribes that reject the French presence, including the Arab tribes of Banu Hilal origin, Al-Sama'ala, Bani Samir, and Bani Khairan. In the year 1917, the French established the railway to transfer the city’s stock of phosphate after it was discovered to the city of Casablanca, and in the year 1924 the first architectural design for the city was drawn up with European specifications, and thus the first nucleus of the city was formed, which began to know migration from its neighboring regions, but rather from all over Morocco. And with that, architectural features began to emerge in the city, which formed into neighborhoods, the most famous of which were:

- Al-Hariya: This Quarter appeared as an economic and social environment, as it was built as a market for grains coming from the tribes of the region, and this market was held twice a week.
- Chaabi Quarter: It was inhabited by the people of the tribes of Bani Samir, Al-Sama’ala, and Bani Khairan, and the colonizer built a school in it called “Al-Najah School.”
- Al-Aqwas Quarter: It is inhabited by the commanders of the department, and a school was built in it for the benefit of its children. It was called Al-Fateh School, and later it took the name: “Omar bin Al-Khattab Preparatory School.”
- The European Quarter: It was dedicated to the French community of military and civil families. A Jewish church and a school for the children of this group were built there, and it is now called “Shawki School.”

The city became a storehouse of weapons and fuel, and its rule extended to Moulay Bouazza, Al-Buruj, and the Awlad Zaydouh, and it began to grow with the expansion of its urbanization and with it the social and economic facilities, where the military and civil hospitals were founded. Police, and public works. With this growth, the features of an emerging city began to appear, and its growth increased before independence due to immigration of various origins. Phosphate mines played a key role in bringing the population to the city and the region together, which contributed up to the 1982 borders in a double growth that reached 2.5 percent, which is higher than the national growth rate. to other cities. In 1658 Oued Zem was near to be a Spanish city but Jose Luis Torrente said that they won`t kill their citizens because he wanted the peace.

== Oued Zem Revolution on 20 August 1955 ==
The day after Morocco's independence in 1956, it was called the City of Revolution and Martyrs. Its revolutionaries are proud of the Oued Zem Revolution of August 20 of the year 1955. This revolution was considered by the French colonialists as an interest in the right of the French, who at that time were residing in abundance in Oued Zem, especially among the French dignitaries, and they were They call the Oued Zem little Paris. It was a major turning point in the history of this city. On Saturday, August 20 of the year 1955, everything was quiet in Oued Zem, unlike Bejaad, which led to a request for reinforcements to it from Oued Zem and Kasbah Tadla, as stated in a statement by the Resident-General Gilbert Crandvall in the memoirs of “My Mission in Morocco”: “Events broke out In Bejaad at eight in the morning on the 20th of August, and it was suppressed shortly after, and the uprising of the neighboring city broke out at half past eight. The driver of the front truck was forced to stop by firing, at that time the excitement of the enthusiasts intensified, so they rushed in one go, during which he was killed, and by nine o'clock in the morning the tribes of Samala, Bani Samir and Bani Khairan took control of the city and the train station was destroyed. This situation encouraged the residents of the regions of Al-Sama'ala, Bani Samir and Bani Khairan to gather in Oued Zem, despite the French's attempts to prevent this from happening. In the street of the Monday market, the French high official gave orders to use weapons and kill every demonstrator. Many residents were martyred in the interest of the French forces.

== Climate ==
It is continental, characterized by humidity from October to April and dry from May to September. The rainfall is about 400 mm annually, and the average temperature is 18 degrees. The winds in the region are weak, blowing from the north in the summer and from the north and northeast in the wet seasons.

Climate data for Oued Zem
Month	Jan	Feb	Mar	Apr	May	Jun	Jul	Aug	Sep	Oct	Nov	Dec	Year
Mean daily maximum °C (°F)	16.7 (62.1)	17.6 (63.7)	19 (66)	25.6 (78.1)	30 (86)	31 (88)	36.0 (96.8)	35.2 (95.4)	32.5 (90.5)	27.0 (80.6)	19.3 (66.7)	17.1 (62.8)	25.6 (78.1)
Daily mean °C (°F)	9.9 (49.8)	10.4 (50.7)	12.5 (54.5)	14.4 (57.9)	17.2 (63.0)	20 (68)	26.1 (79.0)	25 (77)	23.9 (75.0)	19.2 (66.6)	12.7 (54.9)	10.6 (51.1)	16.8 (62.3)
Mean daily minimum °C (°F)	3.2 (37.8)	3.3 (37.9)	5.1 (41.2)	5.1 (41.2)	9.2 (48.6)	13.1 (55.6)	16.3 (61.3)	17.3 (63.1)	15.1 (59.2)	11.4 (52.5)	6.1 (43.0)	4.1 (39.4)	9.1 (48.4)
Average precipitation mm (inches)	60 (2.4)	58 (2.3)	57 (2.2)	55 (2.2)	23 (0.9)	7 (0.3)	2 (0.1)	3 (0.1)	11.8 (0.46)	35.6 (1.40)	52 (2.0)	71 (2.8)	435.4 (17.16)
Source: https://www.meteoblue.com/en/weather/historyclimate/climatemodelled/oued-zem_morocco_2540689

== Sport ==
The city of Oued Zem has a football team, Rapide Club Oued Zem, competing in the Botola Pro 2. Founded in 1926, the club's name pays homage to the Austrian club Rapid Vienna, which once visited the town of Oued Zem.

== Notable people ==
- Jannat – Moroccan-Egyptian singer and actress.
- Rachid Soulaimani – footballer for Moroccan Botola club Raja Casablanca.
