= Boulanouare =

- Town
- Location in Morocco
- Coordinates: 32.857°N 6.879°W
- Country: Morocco
- Region: Béni Mellal-Khénifra
- Province: Khouribga

Population (2004)
  - Total: 10,469
- Time zone: UTC+0 (GMT)

Boulanouare is a town in Khouribga Province, Béni Mellal-Khénifra, Morocco. According to the 2004 census it has a population of 10,469.
