= Settat Province =

Province of Morocco

Coordinates: 33.0000°N 7.6167°W

Settat Province إقليم سطات ⵜⴰⵙⴳⴰ ⵏ ⵚⵟⵟⴰⵜ
- Province
- Interactive map of Settat Province
- Country: Morocco
- Region: Casablanca-Settat
- Seat: Settat

Population (2024)
  - Total: 652,292

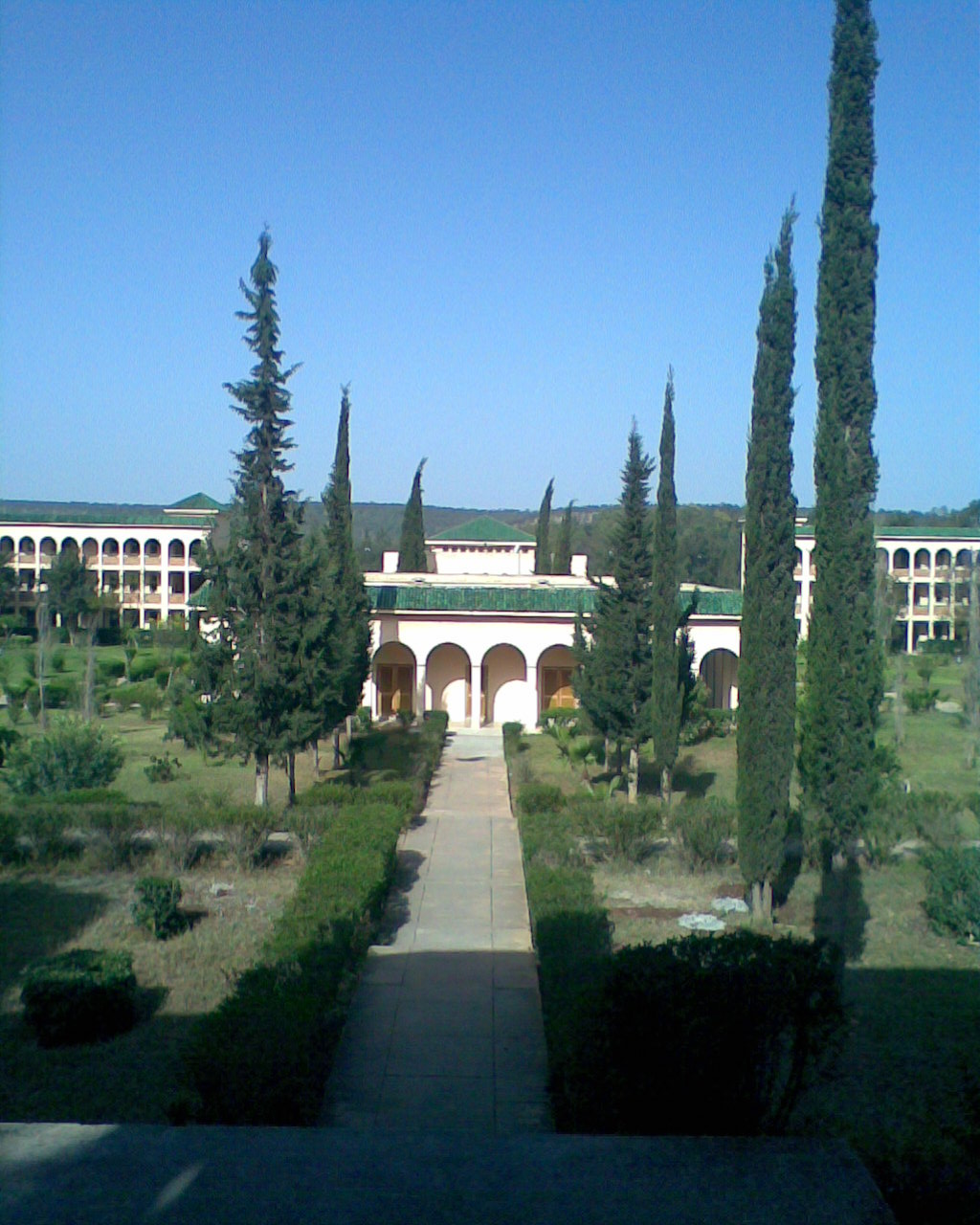
Settat fst

Settat (Arabic: سطات, Standard Moroccan Tamazight: ⵚⵟⵟⴰⵜ) is a province of Morocco in the Casablanca-Settat Region. The province had a population of 651,327 people in 2024.

The governor of the province is Mohamed Ali Habouha.

The major cities are:

- Ben Ahmed
- El Borouj
- Settat

== Subdivisions ==
The province is divided administratively into the following:

| Name | Geographic code | Type | Households | Population (2004) | Foreign population | Moroccan population | Notes |
|---|---|---|---|---|---|---|---|
| Ben Ahmed | 461.01.01. | Municipality | 4528 | 21361 | 3 | 21358 | |
| El Borouj | 461.01.05. | Municipality | 2916 | 16222 | 1 | 16221 | |
| Loulad | 461.01.09. | Municipality | 920 | 5025 | 0 | 5025 | |
| Oulad M'Rah | 461.01.13. | Municipality | 1776 | 9166 | 2 | 9164 | |
| Settat | 461.01.15. | Municipality | 24303 | 116570 | 205 | 116365 | |
| Ain Dorbane | 461.03.01. | Rural commune | 2064 | 13074 | 2 | 13072 | |
| Bouguargouh | 461.03.03. | Rural commune | 1438 | 9385 | 0 | 9385 | |
| Lahlaf M'Zab | 461.03.05. | Rural commune | 1059 | 7160 | 0 | 7160 | |
| Lakhzazra | 461.03.07. | Rural commune | 1345 | 8673 | 0 | 8673 | |
| Mniaa | 461.03.09. | Rural commune | 1618 | 11249 | 0 | 11249 | |
| Mrizigue | 461.03.11. | Rural commune | 1252 | 8876 | 0 | 8876 | |
| M'Garto | 461.03.13. | Rural commune | 1554 | 8827 | 0 | 8827 | |
| N'Khila | 461.03.15. | Rural commune | 1753 | 11503 | 0 | 11503 | |
| Oued Naanaa | 461.03.17. | Rural commune | 1158 | 7126 | 0 | 7126 | |
| Oulad Chbana | 461.03.19. | Rural commune | 1194 | 7925 | 0 | 7925 | |
| Oulad Fares | 461.03.21. | Rural commune | 1812 | 11961 | 0 | 11961 | |
| Oulad M'Hamed | 461.03.23. | Rural commune | 1663 | 10844 | 0 | 10844 | |
| Ras El Ain Chaouia | 461.03.25. | Rural commune | 2603 | 15607 | 0 | 15607 | 3638 residents live in the center, called Ras El Ain; 11969 residents live in rural areas. |
| Sgamna | 461.03.27. | Rural commune | 1291 | 9747 | 0 | 9747 | |
| Sidi Abdelkrim | 461.03.29. | Rural commune | 1341 | 8903 | 0 | 8903 | |
| Sidi Dahbi | 461.03.31. | Rural commune | 1415 | 8367 | 0 | 8367 | |
| Sidi Hajjaj | 461.03.33. | Rural commune | 2741 | 18687 | 0 | 18687 | |
| Ain Blal | 461.07.01. | Rural commune | 882 | 5166 | 0 | 5166 | |
| Bni Khloug | 461.07.03. | Rural commune | 1911 | 12722 | 0 | 12722 | |
| Dar Chaffai | 461.07.05. | Rural commune | 2399 | 17632 | 0 | 17632 | |
| Laqraqra | 461.07.07. | Rural commune | 1318 | 10262 | 0 | 10262 | |
| Meskoura | 461.07.09. | Rural commune | 892 | 7482 | 0 | 7482 | |
| Oulad Amer | 461.07.11. | Rural commune | 753 | 5779 | 0 | 5779 | |
| Oulad Bouali Nouaja | 461.07.13. | Rural commune | 996 | 7402 | 0 | 7402 | |
| Oulad Fares El Halla | 461.07.15. | Rural commune | 550 | 3609 | 0 | 3609 | |
| Oulad Freiha | 461.07.17. | Rural commune | 1608 | 10844 | 0 | 10844 | |
| Sidi Ahmed El Khadir | 461.07.19. | Rural commune | 1129 | 8683 | 0 | 8683 | |
| Sidi Boumehdi | 461.07.21. | Rural commune | 749 | 4832 | 0 | 4832 | |
| Ain Nzagh | 461.09.01. | Rural commune | 1813 | 14367 | 20 | 14347 | |
| Bni Yagrine | 461.09.03. | Rural commune | 1572 | 11957 | 0 | 11957 | |
| Gdana | 461.09.05. | Rural commune | 1569 | 9312 | 0 | 9312 | |
| Guisser | 461.09.07. | Rural commune | 1926 | 11339 | 0 | 11339 | 1890 residents live in the center, called Guisser; 9449 residents live in rural areas. |
| Khemisset Chaouia | 461.09.09. | Rural commune | 1017 | 5722 | 0 | 5722 | |
| Lahouaza | 461.09.11. | Rural commune | 1183 | 7202 | 0 | 7202 | |
| Machraa Ben Abbou | 461.09.13. | Rural commune | 1338 | 8752 | 3 | 8749 | |
| Mzoura | 461.09.15. | Rural commune | 1769 | 10194 | 0 | 10194 | |
| Oulad Aafif | 461.09.17. | Rural commune | 1216 | 7170 | 0 | 7170 | |
| Oulad Said | 461.09.19. | Rural commune | 1639 | 9720 | 1 | 9719 | 2396 residents live in the center, called Oulad Said; 7324 residents live in rural areas. |
| Oulad Sghir | 461.09.21. | Rural commune | 1145 | 6774 | 0 | 6774 | |
| Rima | 461.09.23. | Rural commune | 1440 | 8510 | 0 | 8510 | |
| Sidi El Aidi | 461.09.25. | Rural commune | 2226 | 13273 | 1 | 13272 | |
| Sidi Mohammed Ben Rahal | 461.09.27. | Rural commune | 1631 | 10414 | 0 | 10414 | |
| Tamadroust | 461.09.29. | Rural commune | 1221 | 7973 | 59 | 7914 | |
| Toualet | 461.09.31. | Rural commune | 1708 | 11815 | 0 | 11815 | |
