= Chaouia-Ouardigha =

Chaouia-Ouardigha الشاوية ورديغة
- Region
- Location in Morocco (1997–2015)
- Coordinates: 33°0′N 7°37′W
- Country: Morocco
- Created: 1997
- Abolished: September 2015
- Capital: Settat

Area
  - Total: 7,010 km^{2} (2,710 sq mi)

Population (2014 census)
  - Total: 1,893,950
- Time zone: UTC+1 (CET)

Chaouia-Ouardigha (Arabic: الشاوية ورديغة) was formerly one of the sixteen regions of Morocco from 1997 to 2015. It was situated in north-central Morocco in the historical region of Chaouia. It covered an area of 7,010 km² and had a population of 1,893,950 (2014 census). The capital was Settat.

The last Wali (governor) of the region was Mohamed Moufakkir.

== Dissolution ==
Moroccan regions were reorganized in September 2015: Khouribga Province joined Béni Mellal-Khénifra, while the other three provinces were incorporated into Casablanca-Settat.

== Administrative divisions ==
The region was made up of the following provinces:

- Ben Slimane Province
- Berrechid Province
- Khouribga Province
- Settat Province

== Cities ==
- Ben Slimane
- Bouznika
- Khouribga
- Oued Zem
- Bejaad
- Boujniba
- Boulanouare
- Hattane
- Berrechid
- Ben Ahmed
- El Gara
- El Borouj
- Oulad Abbou
- Deroua
- Oulad M'Rah
- Sidi Rahel Chatai
- Oulad Hriz Sahel
- Loulad
- Ras El Ain
- Soualem
- Oulad Said
- Guisser
