= List of municipalities, communes, and arrondissements of Morocco =

List of municipalities and arrondissements of Morocco

Municipalities, communes, and arrondissements of Morocco بلديات وجماعات ومقاطعات المغرب (Arabic) ⵜⵉⴳⵔⴰⵡⵉⵏ ⵜⵉⵖⵔⵎⴰⵏⵉⵏ ⴷ ⵜⴳⵔⴰⵡⵉⵏ ⵜⵉⴼⴰⵔⴰⵏⵉⵏ ⴷ ⵜⵙⵓⵏⴰⴹ ⵏ ⵍⵎⵖⵔⵉⴱ (Standard Moroccan Tamazight)
- Territorial communities of Morocco (including Western Sahara, a disputed territory)
- Category: Unitary state
- Location: Kingdom of Morocco
- Number: 1,538
- Populations: 305 (Lamssid) – 567,326 (Bni Makada)
- Government: Communal councils, Arrondissement councils

The communes of Morocco, comprising urban municipalities and rural communes, together with arrondissements, constitute the lowest level of administrative division in the country, below the level of prefectures and provinces.

There are 1,503 communes in total.

The following table lists municipalities (urban and rural communes) and arrondissements of Morocco, based on data from the 2024 census, which includes the disputed territory of Western Sahara.

== Municipal types ==
In Morocco, local administrative divisions at the communal level are classified into three types:

- Municipality – an administrative unit with predominantly urban characteristics.
- Arrondissement – a subdivision within a larger municipality, typically found in major urban areas such as Casablanca or Rabat.
- Rural commune – an administrative unit characterized by predominantly rural territory.

== Agadir-Ida Ou Tanane Prefecture ==
=== Rural communes ===
Name	Geographic code	Households (2024)	Population (2024)	Notes
Amskroud	001.05.01.	2395	9648	
Aourir	001.07.03.	11696	46032	Urban centre: Aourir (44,406 inhabitants; 11,284 households)
Aqesri	001.07.05.	914	3333	
Aziar	001.07.07.	618	2053	
Drargua	001.05.09.	25472	107621	Urban centre: Drargua (78,830 inhabitants; 18,648 households)
Idmine	001.05.11.	728	2715	
Imouzzer Ida Ou Tanane	001.07.13.	1094	4087	
Imsouane	001.07.15.	1910	7246	
Tadrart	001.07.21.	881	2899	
Taghazout	001.07.23.	1393	4861	
Tamri	001.07.25.	4899	19790	
Tiqqi	001.07.29.	1695	6378	

=== Municipalities ===
Name	Geographic code	Households (2024)	Population (2024)
Agadir	001.01.01.	143553	504768

== Al Haouz Province ==
=== Rural communes ===
Name	Geographic code	Households (2024)	Population (2024)	Notes
Abadou	041.11.01.	2157	10484	
Aghbar	041.07.01.	852	3447	
Ait Aadel	041.11.03.	1603	8724	
Ait Faska	041.03.05.	7528	33076	
Ait Hkim Ait Yzid	041.11.07.	1517	8104	
Ait Sidi Daoud	041.03.09.	4846	21010	
Amghras	041.05.01.	1492	5966	
Anougal	041.05.05.	1016	4006	
Asni	041.07.03.	4966	22637	
Azgour	041.05.07.	1597	6208	
Dar Jamaa	041.05.09.	1549	6184	
Ghmate	041.03.11.	6526	28674	Urban centre: Ghmate (1,359 inhabitants; 330 households)
Ighil	041.07.05.	1069	4666	
Iguerferouane	041.03.13.	2559	12432	
Ijoukak	041.07.07.	1415	5633	
Imgdal	041.07.09.	1336	4782	
Lalla Takarkoust	041.05.11.	2097	8419	Urban centre: Lalla Takarkoust (4,827 inhabitants; 1,193 households)
Moulay Brahim	041.09.01.	2634	11331	Urban centre: Moulay Brahim (2,609 inhabitants; 709 households)
Ouazguita	041.05.13.	1254	5270	
Ouirgane	041.07.11.	1830	7687	
Oukaimden	041.09.03.	932	4790	
Oulad Mtaa	041.05.15.	1722	6915	
Ourika	041.09.05.	11574	50558	Urban centre: Ourika (24,056 inhabitants; 5,683 households)
Sidi Abdallah Ghiat	041.03.15.	10274	43237	Urban centre: Sidi Abdellah Ghiat (2,513 inhabitants; 599 households)
Sidi Badhaj	041.05.17.	1449	5835	
Sti Fadma	041.09.07.	5162	24159	
Talat N'Yaaqoub	041.07.13.	1954	7153	
Tamaguert	041.11.17.	2313	10022	
Tamazouzte	041.03.19.	3824	16886	
Tameslohte	041.09.11.	9911	40283	Urban centre: Tameslohte (10,481 inhabitants; 2,604 households)
Tazart	041.11.21.	3144	14584	
Tidili Mesfioua	041.03.23.	4611	20283	
Tighedouine	041.11.25.	4152	21161	
Tizguine	041.05.19.	1433	5185	
Touama	041.11.27.	2761	11401	
Zerkten	041.11.29.	3833	18335	

=== Municipalities ===
Name	Geographic code	Households (2024)	Population (2024)
Ait Ourir	041.01.01.	13312	56954
Amizmiz	041.01.03.	3664	13840
Tahannaout	041.01.09.	3847	16236

== Al Hoceima Province ==
=== Rural communes ===
Name	Geographic code	Households (2024)	Population (2024)	Notes
Abdelghaya Souahel	051.09.01.	5156	24435	
Ait Kamra	051.11.01.	1957	8269	Urban centre: Ait Kamra (3,140 inhabitants; 625 households)
Ait Youssef Ou Ali	051.13.03.	3451	13830	
Arbaa Taourirt	051.13.05.	922	3799	
Bni Abdallah	051.11.07.	1283	4939	
Bni Ahmed Imoukzan	051.07.03.	1617	7580	
Bni Ammart	051.07.05.	1242	5583	
Bni Bchir	051.07.07.	1078	5401	
Bni Bouchibet	051.09.09.	1826	8909	
Bni Boufrah	051.03.01.	2083	8401	
Bni Bounsar	051.07.11.	1357	6498	
Bni Gmil	051.03.03.	1546	7752	
Bni Gmil Maksouline	051.03.05.	1481	7214	
Bni Hadifa	051.11.09.	1236	4723	Urban centre: Bni Hadifa (2,115 inhabitants; 555 households)
Chakrane	051.13.11.	773	3306	
Imrabten	051.13.13.	1836	6983	Urban centre: Tamassint (1,796 inhabitants; 470 households)
Issaguen	051.09.13.	3903	17834	Urban centre: Issaguen (2,688 inhabitants; 835 households)
Izemmouren	051.11.15.	1682	6365	
Ketama	051.09.15.	3699	16690	
Louta	051.13.17.	1050	4408	
Moulay Ahmed Cherif	051.09.17.	1836	9357	
Nekkour	051.13.19.	1956	7721	
Rouadi	051.11.21.	1741	6858	
Senada	051.03.07.	1992	8059	
Sidi Boutmim	051.07.19.	1886	8462	
Sidi Bouzineb	051.07.21.	598	2756	
Taghzout	051.09.23.	993	4116	
Tamsaout	051.09.25.	2761	12856	
Tifarouine	051.13.23.	800	3318	
Zaouiat Sidi Abdelkader	051.11.25.	1009	4150	
Zarkt	051.07.27.	1178	5601	

=== Municipalities ===
Name	Geographic code	Households (2024)	Population (2024)
Al Hoceima	051.01.01.	14351	50225
Bni Bouayach	051.01.03.	4969	20013
Imzouren	051.01.05.	8677	34848
Targuist	051.01.07.	3756	14638

== Aousserd Province ==
=== Rural communes ===
Name	Geographic code	Households (2024)	Population (2024)	Notes
Aghouinite	066.03.03.	263	1006	
Aousserd	066.03.05.	106	3855	
Bir Gandouz	066.05.03.	1122	9183	Urban centre: Bir Gandouz (8,246 inhabitants; 765 households)
Tichla	066.03.07.	41	6735	
Zoug	066.03.09.	155	592	

=== Municipalities ===
Name	Geographic code	Households (2024)	Population (2024)
Lagouira	066.01.03.	734	3127

== Assa-Zag Province ==
=== Rural communes ===
Name	Geographic code	Households (2024)	Population (2024)
Al Mahbass	071.05.01.	170	19139
Aouint Lahna	071.03.01.	476	2588
Aouint Yghomane	071.03.03.	677	3370
Labouirat	071.05.03.	217	1057
Touizgui	071.03.05.	177	6787

=== Municipalities ===
Name	Geographic code	Households (2024)	Population (2024)
Assa	071.01.01.	3476	15601
Zag	071.01.03.	1104	4756

== Azilal Province ==
=== Rural communes ===
Name	Geographic code	Households (2024)	Population (2024)	Notes
Afourar	081.11.01.	5050	20215	Urban centre: Afourar (12,981 inhabitants; 3,381 households)
Agoudi N'Lkhair	081.03.01.	2228	11964	
Ait Abbas	081.03.03.	2235	13548	
Ait Blal	081.15.01.	1334	7840	
Ait Bou Oulli	081.03.05.	1866	11992	
Ait Majden	081.15.03.	3851	18538	
Ait Mazigh	081.09.03.	613	2765	
Ait M'Hamed	081.03.07.	4183	23531	
Ait Ouaarda	081.11.05.	279	1459	
Ait Oumdis	081.13.05.	2449	13908	
Ait Ouqabli	081.09.07.	875	3405	
Ait Taguella	081.05.01.	1956	8662	
Ait Tamlil	081.13.07.	3246	18091	
Anergui	081.09.09.	911	3976	
Anzou	081.13.09.	3262	16554	
Bin El Ouidane	081.09.11.	1098	4605	
Bni Ayat	081.11.03.	5318	23675	
Bni Hassane	081.05.05.	2687	12390	
Bzou	081.05.07.	3563	13602	Urban centre: Bzou (4,014 inhabitants; 1,144 households)
Foum Jemaa	081.05.09.	2310	9373	Urban centre: Foum Jemaa (5,804 inhabitants; 1,470 households)
Imlil	081.15.11.	2608	11175	
Isseksi	081.09.13.	369	1464	
Moulay Aissa Ben Driss	081.05.11.	3099	13409	
Ouaouizeght	081.09.15.	3487	13402	Urban centre: Ouaouizeght (8,639 inhabitants; 2,310 households)
Ouaoula	081.15.13.	4758	26410	
Rfala	081.05.13.	2187	9352	
Sidi Boulkhalf	081.15.15.	3028	16229	
Sidi Yacoub	081.13.17.	3549	18868	
Tabant	081.03.09.	2910	16401	
Tabaroucht	081.09.17.	803	3877	
Tabia	081.05.15.	1639	7354	
Tagleft	081.09.19.	3844	16412	
Tamda Noumercid	081.03.11.	2454	12959	
Tanant	081.05.17.	2466	10891	
Taounza	081.05.19.	2407	10254	
Tidili Fetouaka	081.13.19.	2835	13661	
Tiffert N'Ait Hamza	081.09.21.	879	3784	
Tifni	081.15.21.	2299	10906	
Tilougguite	081.09.23.	2455	11592	
Timoulilt	081.11.25.	1732	6852	
Tisqi	081.05.21.	1283	5734	
Zaouiat Ahansal	081.03.13.	2159	11260	

=== Municipalities ===
Name	Geographic code	Households (2024)	Population (2024)
Azilal	081.01.01.	11375	48138
Demnate	081.01.03.	7903	33635

== Benslimane Province ==
=== Rural communes ===
Name	Geographic code	Households (2024)	Population (2024)
Ahlaf	111.03.01.	2742	12116
Ain Tizgha	111.05.03.	4467	21248
Bir Ennasr	111.05.01.	857	4256
Charrate	111.05.05.	2580	11266
Fdalate	111.03.05.	3109	12700
Mellila	111.03.07.	3620	15692
Moualine el Oued	111.03.11.	2164	9117
Oulad Ali Toualaa	111.03.13.	1180	5475
Oulad Yahya Louta	111.03.15.	2201	9612
Rdadna Oulad Malek	111.03.17.	1018	4170
Sidi Bettache	111.05.04.	1759	7595
Ziaida	111.03.19.	3108	14092

=== Municipalities ===
Name	Geographic code	Households (2024)	Population (2024)
Benslimane	111.01.01.	17028	67317
Bouznika	111.01.03.	15160	55722
El Mansouria	111.01.05.	8360	29139

== Berkane Province ==
=== Rural communes ===
Name	Geographic code	Households (2024)	Population (2024)	Notes
Aghbal	113.03.01.	4288	16113	
Boughriba	113.05.03.	4777	19013	
Chouihia	113.05.05.	2893	11249	
Fezouane	113.03.07.	1517	5783	
Laatamna	113.03.09.	3766	14561	
Madagh	113.03.11.	3665	14659	Urban centre: Madagh (6,910 inhabitants; 1,694 households)
Rislane	113.05.13.	1015	3783	
Sidi Bouhria	113.05.15.	1115	4088	
Tafoughalt	113.05.17.	623	2366	
Zegzel	113.05.19.	6021	23846	

=== Municipalities ===
Name	Geographic code	Households (2024)	Population (2024)
Ahfir	113.01.01.	4612	16310
Ain Erreggada	113.01.05.	658	2391
Aklim	113.01.07.	2330	8630
Berkane	113.01.09.	27454	99069
Saidia	113.01.25.	3220	10514
Sidi Slimane Echcharraa	113.01.29.	7689	31686

== Berrechid Province ==
=== Rural communes ===
Name	Geographic code	Households (2024)	Population (2024)
Ben Maachou	117.05.01.	2014	8338
Foqra Oulad Aameur	117.08.05.	1540	6093
Jaqma	117.08.07.	2405	10733
Kasbat Ben Mchich	117.08.09.	3140	15374
Laghnimyine	117.05.11.	3626	18081
Lahsasna	117.05.13.	2278	10854
Lambarkiyine	117.08.17.	2105	8863
Ouled Cebbah	117.08.19.	1808	7489
Ouled Zidane	117.08.21.	1525	6554
Riah	117.08.23.	1976	8421
Sahel Oulad H'Riz	117.09.25.	9788	43776
Sidi Abdelkhaleq	117.05.27.	1174	6141
Sidi El Mekki	117.05.29.	2306	9476
Zaouiat Sidi Ben Hamdoun	117.05.35.	2083	9315

=== Municipalities ===
Name	Geographic code	Households (2024)	Population (2024)
Berrechid	117.01.03.	44011	168687
Deroua	117.01.05.	25918	96619
El Gara	117.01.07.	5381	20467
Had Soualem	117.01.09.	19130	74762
Oulad Abbou	117.01.11.	2522	10894
Sidi Rahal Chatai	117.01.13.	9604	34431

== Boujdour Province ==
=== Rural communes ===
Name	Geographic code	Households (2024)	Population (2024)
Gueltat Zemmour	121.03.01.	33	6881
Jraifia	121.03.03.	385	835
Lamssid	121.03.05.	196	305

=== Municipalities ===
Name	Geographic code	Households (2024)	Population (2024)
Boujdour	121.01.01.	13815	57360

== Boulemane Province ==
=== Rural communes ===
Name	Geographic code	Households (2024)	Population (2024)	Notes
Ait Bazza	131.09.01.	637	2397	
Ait El Mane	131.09.03.	486	1694	
Almis Marmoucha	131.09.05.	560	2292	
El Mers	131.09.07.	1360	4887	
El Orjane	131.07.01.	1608	7706	
Enjil	131.03.09.	2146	7984	
Ermila	131.07.03.	1765	8333	
Fritissa	131.07.05.	5726	29594	
Guigou	131.03.11.	5968	24677	Urban centre: Guigou (12,913 inhabitants; 3,212 households)
Ksabi Moulouya	131.05.01.	2507	10471	
Ouizeght	131.05.03.	1212	5430	
Oulad Ali Youssef	131.07.07.	740	3279	
Serghina	131.09.13.	1040	3567	
Sidi Boutayeb	131.05.05.	2348	9969	
Skoura M'Daz	131.03.15.	2471	8297	Urban centre: Skoura (2,632 inhabitants; 810 households)
Talzemt	131.09.17.	668	2701	
Tissaf	131.07.09.	2270	11615	

=== Municipalities ===
Name	Geographic code	Households (2024)	Population (2024)
Boulemane	131.01.01.	1947	6761
Imouzzer Marmoucha	131.01.02.	1355	4676
Missour	131.01.03.	7162	28408
Outat El Haj	131.01.05.	4533	20673

== Beni Mellal Province ==
=== Rural communes ===
Name	Geographic code	Households (2024)	Population (2024)	Notes
Aghbala	091.05.01.	3622	13373	Urban centre: Aghbala (7,761 inhabitants; 2,267 households)
Ait Oum El Bekht	091.07.03.	2072	7863	
Boutferda	091.05.05.	1581	7952	
Dir El Ksiba	091.07.07.	6528	25851	Urban centre: Ighram Laalam (11,305 inhabitants; 2,780 households)
Foum El Anceur	091.03.11.	5809	24232	
Foum Oudi	091.03.01.	3810	16256	
Guettaya	091.11.01.	3135	13153	
Naour	091.07.11.	1357	5389	
Oulad Gnaou	091.03.03.	3199	13366	
Oulad M'Barek	091.03.05.	5228	21636	Urban centre: Ouled M'barek (14,832 inhabitants; 3,630 households)
Oulad Said L'Oued	091.11.05.	3354	13441	
Oulad Yaich	091.03.07.	6189	25785	Urban centre: Ouled Yaich (9,681 inhabitants; 2,451 households)
Oulad Youssef	091.11.03.	3290	14247	
Semguet	091.11.07.	1996	8167	
Sidi Jaber	091.03.09.	4306	20455	Urban centre: Sidi Jaber (4,306 inhabitants; 1,132 households)
Taghzirt	091.07.13.	5346	20023	
Tanougha	091.07.15.	3376	13773	
Tizi N'Isly	091.05.17.	2956	12547	

=== Municipalities ===
Name	Geographic code	Households (2024)	Population (2024)
Beni Mellal	091.01.01.	56987	209594
El Ksiba	091.01.03.	5922	19964
Kasba Tadla	091.01.07.	13030	48172
Zaouiat Cheikh	091.01.13.	7304	25088

== Casablanca Prefecture ==
=== Municipalities ===
Name	Geographic code	Households (2024)	Population (2024)
Mechouar De Casablanca	141.01.81.	601	2101

=== Arrondissements of Casablanca ===
Name	Geographic code	Households (2024)	Population (2024)
Aïn Chock	141.01.41.	102598	374707
Aïn Sebaâ	141.01.21.	40875	155828
Al Fida	141.01.11.	35993	125933
Anfa	141.01.01.	22331	66202
Roches Noires	141.01.23.	32260	104775
Ben M'Sick	141.01.61.	29445	105612
Maârif	141.01.03.	51113	139669
Hay Hassani	141.01.31.	157634	537509
Hay Mohammadi	141.01.25.	28469	104232
Mers Sultan	141.01.13.	30509	98139
Moulay Rachid	141.01.71.	63294	245139
Sbata	141.01.63.	26764	101640
Sidi Belyout	141.01.07.	47055	138294
Sidi Bernoussi	141.01.51.	42626	154919
Sidi Moumen	141.01.53.	142020	551443
Sidi Othmane	141.01.73.	56242	211894

== Chefchaouen Province ==
=== Rural communes ===
Name	Geographic code	Households (2024)	Population (2024)	Notes
Amtar	151.09.01.	1814	8568	
Bab Berred	151.03.03.	5557	24743	Urban centre: Bab Berred (5,947 inhabitants; 1,488 households)
Bab Taza	151.05.01.	6246	29895	Urban centre: Bab Taza (6,046 inhabitants; 1,462 households)
Bni Ahmed Cherqia	151.06.05.	2668	10800	
Bni Ahmed Gharbia	151.06.07.	2655	10623	
Bni Bouzra	151.07.01.	3363	15888	
Bni Darkoul	151.05.03.	2870	13984	
Bni Faghloum	151.05.05.	2165	9260	
Bni Mansour	151.11.03.	3154	16660	
Bni Rzine	151.09.09.	3366	16539	
Bni Salah	151.05.07.	2057	10535	
Bni Selmane	151.11.05.	3958	21413	
Bni Smih	151.09.11.	2780	13918	
Derdara	151.05.09.	2506	11276	
Fifi	151.05.11.	1627	6762	
Iounane	151.03.13.	3966	19494	
Laghdir	151.05.13.	1526	6454	
Mansoura	151.06.15.	2960	13526	
M'Tioua	151.09.17.	2430	10336	Urban centre: Jebha (4,471 inhabitants; 1,187 households)
Ouaouzgane	151.09.19.	2771	12766	
Oued Malha	151.06.21.	2638	12075	
Talambote	151.07.09.	1598	8007	
Tamorot	151.03.23.	5304	24258	
Tanaqoub	151.05.15.	1808	8097	
Tassift	151.07.11.	1459	6924	
Tizgane	151.07.13.	2804	12292	
Steha	151.07.07.	2432	11452	

=== Municipalities ===
Name	Geographic code	Households (2024)	Population (2024)
Chefchaouen	151.01.01.	12474	46168

== Chichaoua Province ==
=== Rural communes ===
Name	Geographic code	Households (2024)	Population (2024)	Notes
Adassil	161.07.01.	1702	7078	
Afalla Issen	161.05.01.	1928	7221	
Ahdil	161.03.01.	2290	11130	
Ain Tazitounte	161.05.03.	1166	4651	
Ait Haddou Youssef	161.05.05.	1022	5174	
Ait Hadi	161.03.03.	2189	8847	
Assif El Mal	161.07.03.	2024	8002	
Bouabout	161.09.01.	2510	9825	
Bouabout Amdlane	161.09.03.	1633	6405	
Douirane	161.07.05.	3993	17256	
Gmassa	161.07.07.	2660	10675	
Ichamraren	161.09.05.	1537	5707	
Imindounit	161.07.09.	2337	10890	
Irohalen	161.05.07.	1261	5031	
Kouzemt	161.09.07.	927	3371	
Lalla Aaziza	161.05.09.	1656	7534	
Lamzoudia	161.03.05.	5960	27004	
Majjat	161.07.11.	3557	14708	
M'Zouda	161.07.13.	6177	25342	
Nfifa	161.05.11.	1643	6282	
Oued L'Bour	161.05.13.	1352	4918	
Oulad Moumna	161.03.07.	1708	7092	
Rahhala	161.09.09.	1344	4859	
Saidate	161.03.09.	1602	6354	
Sidi Abdelmoumen	161.09.11.	2063	7055	
Sidi Bouzid Arragragui	161.03.13.	2152	8622	
Sidi Ghanem	161.05.15.	2073	8397	
Sidi M'Hamed Dalil	161.03.15.	1338	5619	
Sid L'Mokhtar	161.03.11.	6764	27083	Urban centre: Sid L'mokhtar (20,860 inhabitants; 5,251 households)
Taouloukoult	161.09.13.	2436	9362	
Timezgadiouine	161.05.17.	1770	6780	
Timlilt	161.09.15.	1504	5582	
Zaouia Annahlia	161.07.15.	2490	11722	

=== Municipalities ===
Name	Geographic code	Households (2024)	Population (2024)
Chichaoua	161.01.01.	9127	38452
Imintanoute	161.01.03.	6367	25049

== Chtouka-Ait Baha Province ==
=== Rural communes ===
Name	Geographic code	Households (2024)	Population (2024)	Notes
Ait Milk	163.05.03.	2523	8706	
Ait Mzal	163.03.05.	970	3305	
Ait Ouadrim	163.03.07.	1455	4976	
Aouguenz	163.03.09.	1050	2941	
Belfaa	163.05.11.	9935	36774	Urban centre: Belfaâ (13,492 inhabitants; 3,649 households)
Hilala	163.03.13.	630	1858	
Ida Ougnidif	163.03.15.	787	2095	
Imi Mqourn	163.07.17.	2783	10365	
Inchaden	163.05.19.	11959	42724	
Massa	163.05.21.	4994	17946	Urban centre: Massa (11,496 inhabitants; 3,198 households)
Ouad Essafa	163.07.23.	21290	83442	
Sidi Abdallah El Bouchouari	163.03.25.	1834	6604	
Sidi Boushab	163.07.29.	2294	8386	
Sidi Ouassay	163.05.31.	2748	10050	
Tanalt	163.03.33.	766	2138	
Targua Ntouchka	163.03.35.	1083	3371	
Tassegdelt	163.03.37.	1260	4046	
Tizi Ntakoucht	163.03.39.	417	1098	

=== Municipalities ===
Name	Geographic code	Households (2024)	Population (2024)	Notes
Ait Amira	163.01.01.	30592	113236	Urban centre: Ait Amira (78,163 inhabitants; 21,308 households)
Ait Baha	163.01.03.	1611	6007	
Biougra	163.01.11.	13774	50626	
Sidi Bibi	163.01.27.	18972	72929	Urban centre: Sidi Bibi (12,359 inhabitants; 3,008 households)

== Driouch Province ==
=== Rural communes ===
Name	Geographic code	Households (2024)	Population (2024)	Notes
Ain Zohra	167.17.01.	2163	8705	
Ait Mait	167.15.03.	1254	4721	
Amejjaou	167.15.05.	1087	4177	
Azlaf	167.13.01.	1102	4132	
Bni Marghnine	167.11.05.	1410	4950	
Boudinar	167.11.07.	2161	7996	
Dar El Kebdani	167.15.07.	2327	8518	Urban centre: Dar El Kebdani (3,595 inhabitants; 978 households)
Iferni	167.13.09.	1311	4873	
Ijermaouas	167.11.11.	1351	5303	
M'Hajer	167.13.15.	2062	8008	
Ouardana	167.13.17.	1765	7032	
Oulad Amghar	167.11.19.	1422	5755	
Oulad Boubker	167.17.11.	932	3703	
Tafersit	167.13.21.	2271	8202	Urban centre: Tafersit (2,964 inhabitants; 828 households)
Talilit	167.13.23.	1134	3881	
Tazaghine	167.15.13.	927	3456	
Temsamane	167.11.25.	3268	12198	Urban centre: Kourouna (2,858 inhabitants; 789 households)
Trougout	167.11.27.	2754	11348	
Tsaft	167.13.29.	2168	8401	Urban centre: Kassita (2,876 inhabitants; 756 households)

=== Municipalities ===
Name	Geographic code	Households (2024)	Population (2024)
Ben Taieb	167.01.03.	3877	15002
Driouch	167.01.09.	4168	15661
Midar	167.01.13.	3975	15391

== El Hajeb Province ==
=== Rural communes ===
Name	Geographic code	Households (2024)	Population (2024)	Notes
Ait Boubidmane	171.05.01.	5674	22780	Urban centre: Bouderbala (10,418 inhabitants; 2,766 households)
Ait Bourzouine	171.07.01.	1785	7906	
Ait Harz Allah	171.05.03.	3260	13604	
Ait Naamane	171.07.03.	1348	5857	
Ait Ouikhalfen	171.03.01.	856	3261	
Ait Yaazem	171.03.03.	4239	16912	Urban centre: Kantina (5,033 inhabitants; 1,213 households)
Bitit	171.05.05.	3664	15241	
Iqaddar	171.07.05.	2127	8774	
Jahjouh	171.03.05.	1967	7867	Urban centre: Sebt Jahjouh (4,276 inhabitants; 1,131 households)
Laqsir	171.05.07.	7632	32377	
Ras Ijerri	171.03.07.	1744	6707	
Tamchachate	171.03.09.	806	3562	

=== Municipalities ===
Name	Geographic code	Households (2024)	Population (2024)
Agourai	171.01.01.	4819	19158
Ain Taoujdate	171.01.03.	8342	33055
El Hajeb	171.01.05.	11069	41359
Sabaa Aiyoun	171.01.07.	6926	28736

== El Jadida Province ==
=== Rural communes ===
Name	Geographic code	Households (2024)	Population (2024)	Notes
Boulaouane	181.09.01.	3256	14740	
Chaibate	181.09.03.	2302	9821	
Chtouka	181.03.01.	7746	38025	
Haouzia	181.07.03.	8000	35777	
Laghdira	181.03.05.	5709	26192	
Lamharza Essahel	181.03.07.	4645	20929	
Mettouh	181.09.05.	5838	26075	
Mogress	181.09.07.	3317	16277	
Moulay Abdallah	181.05.01.	26214	103993	Urban centre: My Abdellah (17,438 inhabitants; 4,475 households)
Oulad Aissa	181.05.03.	5302	25367	
Oulad Frej	181.09.13.	4900	20176	Urban centre: Ouled Frej (13,607 inhabitants; 3,414 households)
Oulad Ghanem	181.05.05.	5907	27895	
Oulad Hamdane	181.09.09.	2714	12130	
Oulad Hcine	181.05.07.	7501	36018	
Oulad Rahmoune	181.07.09.	6585	33380	
Oulad Sidi Ali Ben Youssef	181.09.11.	2057	9641	
Sebt Saiss	181.09.15.	2441	11052	
Sidi Abed	181.05.09.	5736	25935	
Sidi Ali Ben Hamdouche	181.03.11.	8795	38169	Urban centre: Sidi Ali Ben Hamdouche (11,077 inhabitants; 2,782 households)
Sidi M'Hamed Akhdim	181.05.11.	2481	11038	
Sidi Smail	181.09.19.	7419	32694	Urban centre: Sidi Smail (7,311 inhabitants; 1,819 households)
Si Hsaien Ben Abderrahmane	181.09.17.	1422	6014	
Zaouiat Lakouacem	181.09.23.	2541	11490	
Zaouiat Saiss	181.09.21.	2378	11730	

=== Municipalities ===
Name	Geographic code	Households (2024)	Population (2024)
Azemmour	181.01.01.	11546	42098
El-Jadida	181.01.03.	67491	237464
Lbir Jdid	181.01.05.	7435	30247

== Errachidia Province ==
=== Rural communes ===
Name	Geographic code	Households (2024)	Population (2024)	Notes
Aarab Sebbah Gheris	201.03.01.	911	4758	
Aarab Sebbah Ziz	201.03.03.	3771	20538	
Aghbalou N'Kerdous	201.15.01.	1943	10675	
Amellagou	201.13.02.	1060	4711	
Aoufous	201.07.01.	1938	8888	Urban centre: Aoufous (1,081 inhabitants; 265 households)
Bni M'Hamed Sijelmassa	201.11.01.	2361	11925	
Chorfa M'Daghra	201.07.03.	3641	18171	
Rissani	201.11.03.	701	4353	
Er-Rteb	201.07.05.	2544	12852	
Es-Sfalat	201.11.05.	1732	8586	
Es-Sifa	201.03.07.	1130	6531	
Et-Taous	201.11.07.	1897	9360	
Ferkla El Oulia	201.15.03.	4404	23449	
Ferkla Es-Soufla	201.15.05.	2272	11886	
Fezna	201.03.09.	846	4400	
Gheris El Ouloui	201.13.07.	2450	12193	
Gheris Es-Soufli	201.13.09.	1386	6877	
Lkheng	201.07.07.	4011	18381	
Melaab	201.15.11.	3378	17230	
Oued Naam	201.07.09.	1198	5708	
Sidi Ali	201.11.09.	336	1973	
Tadighoust	201.13.13.	1453	6018	

=== Municipalities ===
Name	Geographic code	Households (2024)	Population (2024)
Arfoud	201.01.01.	6309	28912
Boudnib	201.01.03.	2878	13411
Errachidia	201.01.05.	22944	97687
Goulmima	201.01.09.	3588	14624
Jorf	201.01.11.	2521	11865
Moulay Ali Cherif	201.01.13.	4481	22082
Tinejdad	201.01.15.	2023	9528

== Es-Semara Province ==
=== Rural communes ===
Name	Geographic code	Households (2024)	Population (2024)
Amgala	221.03.01.	83	4102
Haouza	221.03.03.	78	5197
Jdiriya	221.03.05.	69	1792
Sidi Ahmed Laaroussi	221.03.07.	130	438
Tifariti	221.03.09.	38	5728

=== Municipalities ===
Name	Geographic code	Households (2024)	Population (2024)
Smara	221.01.01.	13730	56607

== Essaouira Province ==
=== Rural communes ===
Name	Geographic code	Households (2024)	Population (2024)	Notes
Adaghas	211.07.01.	432	1656	
Aglif	211.07.03.	1712	6499	
Aguerd	211.05.05.	1453	5370	
Ait Aissi Ihahane	211.05.07.	768	2563	
Ait Said	211.09.01.	1557	6027	
Aquermoud	211.03.03.	3994	15981	
Assais	211.07.09.	1207	4442	
Bizdad	211.07.11.	1742	7077	
Bouzemmour	211.07.13.	1015	3940	
Ezzaouite	211.07.15.	1470	5818	
Had Dra	211.03.05.	2432	9435	
Ida Ou Aazza	211.05.17.	1792	7635	
Ida Ou Guelloul	211.05.19.	1311	5086	
Ida Ou Kazzou	211.05.21.	951	3511	
Imgrade	211.05.23.	1243	4817	
Imi N'Tlit	211.05.25.	1666	7179	
Kechoula	211.09.07.	1389	5934	
Korimate	211.09.09.	2316	9526	
Lagdadra	211.09.11.	1701	6699	
Lahsinate	211.09.13.	1262	4932	
Mejji	211.09.15.	1497	6479	
Meskala	211.09.17.	1065	4378	
M'Khalif	211.03.25.	1301	5062	
Mouarid	211.09.19.	1263	5320	
Moulay Bouzarqtoune	211.03.21.	1422	5608	
M'Ramer	211.09.27.	1557	6488	
Mzilate	211.09.23.	853	3573	
Oulad M'Rabet	211.09.29.	936	3951	
Ounagha	211.03.31.	3618	13310	Urban centre: Ounagha (1,699 inhabitants; 496 households)
Sidi Abdeljalil	211.03.33.	1685	6056	
Sidi Ahmed Essayeh	211.05.27.	1330	5233	
Sidi Aissa Regragui	211.09.35.	1800	7567	
Sidi Ali El Korati	211.03.37.	1557	6099	
Sidi Boulaalam	211.09.39.	1801	7681	
Sidi El Jazouli	211.05.29.	1447	5554	
Sidi Ghaneme	211.07.31.	943	4161	
Sidi Hmad Ou Hamed	211.05.35.	985	3548	
Sidi H'Mad Ou M'Barek	211.05.33.	1294	4726	
Sidi Ishaq	211.03.41.	2434	10055	
Sidi Kaouki	211.05.37.	1482	4877	
Sidi Laaroussi	211.03.43.	2512	10604	
Sidi M'Hamed Ou Marzouq	211.09.45.	963	4306	
Smimou	211.05.39.	2229	8883	Urban centre: Smimou (4,033 inhabitants; 991 households)
Tafedna	211.05.41.	1265	4999	
Tafetachte	211.09.47.	1850	7342	Urban centre: Tafetachte (1,546 inhabitants; 443 households)
Tahelouante	211.07.43.	757	2910	
Takate	211.03.49.	2545	9993	
Takoucht	211.07.45.	919	3209	
Targante	211.05.47.	1542	6392	
Tidzi	211.05.49.	984	3770	
Timizguida Ouftas	211.05.51.	1233	4952	
Zaouiat Ben Hmida	211.03.51.	1811	7317	

=== Municipalities ===
Name	Geographic code	Households (2024)	Population (2024)
Ait Daoud	211.01.01.	974	3653
El Hanchane	211.01.03.	1360	5319
Essaouira	211.01.05.	24719	82962
Talmest	211.01.07.	1322	4638
Tamanar	211.01.09.	2934	11617

== Fahs-Anjra Province ==
=== Rural communes ===
Name	Geographic code	Households (2024)	Population (2024)	Notes
Al Bahraoyine	227.05.01.	3912	15491	
Anjra	227.03.05.	3992	17251	Urban centre: Anjra (3,763 inhabitants; 899 households)
Jouamaa	227.03.11.	2416	10039	
Ksar El Majaz	227.03.13.	3437	12703	
Ksar Sghir	227.05.05.	4391	17125	
Malloussa	227.05.09.	4627	18854	
Taghramt	227.03.21.	2385	9326	

== Figuig Province ==
=== Rural communes ===
Name	Geographic code	Households (2024)	Population (2024)	Notes
Abbou Lakhal	251.05.01.	295	1790	
Ain Chouater	251.03.01.	185	706	
Bni Guil	251.05.03.	1828	8261	
Bni Tadjite	251.03.03.	4338	17557	Urban centre: Bni Tadjite (9,474 inhabitants; 2,316 households)
Bouanane	251.03.05.	2243	11181	Urban centre: Bouanane (4,521 inhabitants; 980 households)
Bouchaouene	251.07.07.	3554	15242	
Boumerieme	251.07.09.	2124	8067	
Maatarka	251.05.05.	1334	6554	
Talsint	251.07.11.	5061	18806	Urban centre: Talsint (12,629 inhabitants; 3,462 households)
Tendrara	251.05.07.	3188	14269	Urban centre: Tendrara (9,262 inhabitants; 2,181 households)

=== Municipalities ===
Name	Geographic code	Households (2024)	Population (2024)
Bouarfa	251.01.01.	6715	30068
Figuig	251.01.03.	2843	10449

== Fquih Ben Salah Province ==
=== Rural communes ===
Name	Geographic code	Households (2024)	Population (2024)	Notes
Al Khalfia	255.09.01.	3279	13766	
Bni Chegdale	255.09.03.	2355	10413	
Bni Oukil	255.09.05.	3158	14097	
Bradia	255.09.07.	8836	37064	Urban centre: Bradia (8,543 inhabitants; 2,233 households)
Dar Ould Zidouh	255.11.01.	6663	30114	Urban centre: Dar Ould Zidouh (11,558 inhabitants; 2,769 households)
Had Boumoussa	255.11.03.	8985	41154	
Hel Merbaa	255.09.09.	2414	9692	
Krifate	255.09.11.	6576	28601	
Oulad Bourahmoune	255.05.05.	3292	14583	
Oulad Nacer	255.11.07.	5836	26733	
Oulad Zmam	255.05.09.	6547	30039	
Sidi Aissa Ben Ali	255.05.11.	5558	24503	
Sidi Hammadi	255.05.13.	3083	12981	

=== Municipalities ===
Name	Geographic code	Households (2024)	Population (2024)
Fquih Ben Salah	255.01.05.	25065	97380
Oulad Ayad	255.01.09.	5853	24564
Souk Sebt Oulad Nemma	255.01.11.	14168	60293

== Fez Prefecture ==
=== Rural communes ===
Name	Geographic code	Households (2024)	Population (2024)	Notes
Ain Bida	231.81.03.	2457	11109	
Sidi Harazem	231.81.05.	1450	5748	Urban centre: Skhinate (3,446 inhabitants; 920 households)

=== Municipalities ===
Name	Geographic code	Households (2024)	Population (2024)	Notes
Mechouar Fes Jdid	231.01.03.	4503	15121	
Oulad Tayeb	231.01.15.	13554	56352	Urban centre: Oulad Tayeb (44,614 inhabitants; 11,014 households)

=== Arrondissements of Fez ===
Name	Geographic code	Households (2024)	Population (2024)
Agdal (Fez)	231.01.01.	39373	128030
El Mariniyine	231.01.11.	54509	206427
Fes-Medina	231.01.07.	13730	49775
Jnan El Ouard	231.01.09.	45619	187737
Saiss	231.01.05.	64927	237242
Zouagha	231.01.13.	89164	358631

== Guelmim Province ==
=== Rural communes ===
Name	Geographic code	Households (2024)	Population (2024)	Notes
Abaynou	261.07.01.	722	3038	
Aday	261.03.01.	783	2828	
Aferkat	261.05.03.	221	978	
Ait Boufoulen	261.03.03.	222	941	
Amtdi	261.03.05.	298	1137	
Asrir	261.05.05.	759	3217	
Echatea El Abied	261.07.07.	213	928	
Fask	261.05.09.	862	3511	
Ifrane Atlas-Saghir	261.03.07.	2639	10375	Urban centre: Ifrane Atlas Saghir (1,805 inhabitants; 479 households)
Labyar	261.07.11.	121	433	
Laqsabi Tagoust	261.07.13.	663	2592	
Rass Oumlil	261.07.15.	239	839	
Tagante	261.03.09.	980	4455	
Taghjijt	261.03.11.	2332	9059	Urban centre: Taghjijt (6,668 inhabitants; 1,734 households)
Taliouine Assaka	261.07.17.	245	865	
Targa Wassay	261.07.19.	161	635	
Tiglit	261.05.21.	137	798	
Timoulay	261.03.13.	1197	4873	

=== Municipalities ===
Name	Geographic code	Households (2024)	Population (2024)
Bouizakarne	261.01.01.	4113	18036
Guelmim	261.01.03.	30343	126729

== Guercif Province ==
=== Rural communes ===
Name	Geographic code	Households (2024)	Population (2024)
Assebbab	265.05.01.	1382	7144
Barkine	265.05.03.	1419	6839
Houara Oulad Raho	265.05.05.	8400	39947
Lamrija	265.05.07.	3013	14457
Mazguitam	265.07.09.	1479	6141
Oulad Bourima	265.07.11.	266	1117
Ras Laksar	265.07.13.	2712	12092
Saka	265.05.15.	4381	20857
Taddart	265.07.17.	5901	26540

=== Municipalities ===
Name	Geographic code	Households (2024)	Population (2024)
Guercif	265.01.03.	18585	80703

== Ifrane Province ==
=== Rural communes ===
Name	Geographic code	Households (2024)	Population (2024)	Notes
Ain Leuh	271.03.01.	2731	8989	Urban centre: Ain Leuh (4,774 inhabitants; 1,486 households)
Ben Smim	271.03.03.	1698	7676	
Dayat Aoua	271.01.05.	2818	12050	
Oued Ifrane	271.03.05.	2821	10267	Urban centre: Souk L'had (2,893 inhabitants; 911 households)
Sidi El Makhfi	271.03.07.	4264	16441	Urban centre: Sidi Addi (5,025 inhabitants; 1,399 households)
Tigrigra	271.03.09.	2543	10085	
Timahdite	271.03.11.	3004	11571	Urban centre: Timahdite (4,582 inhabitants; 1,278 households)
Tizguite	271.01.07.	2763	12204	

=== Municipalities ===
Name	Geographic code	Households (2024)	Population (2024)
Azrou	271.01.01.	16228	57657
Ifrane	271.01.03.	3814	13964

== Inezgane-Ait Melloul Prefecture ==
=== Rural communes ===
Name	Geographic code	Households (2024)	Population (2024)	Notes
Oulad Dahou	273.05.19.	3982	15697	
Temsia	273.05.27.	12689	52663	Urban centre: Temsia (37,128 inhabitants; 8,861 households)

=== Municipalities ===
Name	Geographic code	Households (2024)	Population (2024)
Ait Melloul	273.01.05.	53781	210870
Dcheira El Jihadia	273.01.13.	30582	113041
Inezgane	273.01.15.	34902	137512
Lqliaa	273.01.17.	25615	107133

== Jerada Province ==
=== Rural communes ===
Name	Geographic code	Households (2024)	Population (2024)	Notes
Bni Mathar	275.05.01.	2223	10887	
Gafait	275.07.03.	621	2604	
Guenfouda	275.09.05.	1359	5712	
Laaouinate	275.07.07.	930	5467	
Lebkhata	275.07.09.	592	2541	
Mrija	275.05.11.	563	2882	
Oulad Ghziyel	275.05.13.	856	4656	
Oulad Sidi Abdelhakem	275.05.15.	254	1276	
Ras Asfour	275.09.13.	312	1275	
Sidi Boubker	275.09.15.	594	2354	Urban centre: Sidi Boubker (1,747 inhabitants; 459 households)
Tiouli	275.09.21.	975	4305	Urban centre: Oued El Heimer (1,407 inhabitants; 350 households)

=== Municipalities ===
Name	Geographic code	Households (2024)	Population (2024)
Ain Bni Mathar	275.01.03.	3605	15488
Jerada	275.01.17.	10141	41014
Touissit	275.01.35.	808	3066

== Khouribga Province ==
=== Rural communes ===
Name	Geographic code	Households (2024)	Population (2024)	Notes
Ain Kaicher	311.03.01.	1036	3900	
Ait Ammar	311.07.01.	872	3392	
Bir Mezoui	311.05.01.	1404	5617	
Bni Bataou	311.03.03.	1040	4191	
Bni Smir	311.07.03.	1180	6725	
Bni Ykhlef	311.05.03.	2134	8928	
Bni Zrantel	311.03.05.	1367	5533	
Boukhrisse	311.03.07.	1059	4323	
Boulanouare	311.05.05.	3799	15043	Urban centre: Boulanouare (11,232 inhabitants; 2,848 households)
Braksa	311.07.05.	1654	6948	
Chougrane	311.03.09.	1357	5591	
El Foqra	311.05.09.	715	2965	
Kasbat Troch	311.07.07.	1973	8612	
Lagfaf	311.05.07.	2143	8560	
Lagnadiz	311.07.09.	1608	6905	
Maadna	311.07.11.	1302	5595	
M'Fassis	311.05.11.	1192	4937	
Oulad Abdoune	311.05.13.	3548	15860	
Oulad Aissa	311.07.13.	1081	4652	
Oulad Azzouz	311.05.15.	1989	8983	
Oulad Boughadi	311.07.15.	1991	8147	
Oulad Fennane	311.07.17.	1605	6912	
Oulad Ftata	311.07.19.	633	2552	
Oulad Gouaouch	311.03.11.	661	2474	
Rouached	311.03.13.	680	3353	
Tachrafat	311.03.15.	834	3082	

=== Municipalities ===
Name	Geographic code	Households (2024)	Population (2024)
Bejaad	311.01.01.	13154	47209
Boujniba	311.01.03.	3755	14722
Hattane	311.01.05.	2471	9727
Khouribga	311.01.07.	49840	195931
Oued Zem	311.01.09.	24423	93776

== Khémisset Province ==
=== Rural communes ===
Name	Geographic code	Households (2024)	Population (2024)	Notes
Ain Johra-Sidi Boukhalkhal	291.09.02.	4050	16644	
Ain Sbit	291.07.01.	2538	10425	
Ait Belkacem	291.09.03.	1124	4396	
Ait Bouyahya El Hajjama	291.09.05.	1215	4491	
Ait Ichou	291.05.01.	368	1454	
Ait Ikkou	291.05.03.	2311	8179	
Ait Malek	291.09.07.	927	3809	
Ait Mimoune	291.03.01.	1915	7065	
Ait Ouribel	291.03.03.	2293	9375	
Ait Siberne	291.03.05.	1211	4676	
Ait Yadine	291.03.07.	5227	21007	Urban centre: Ait Yadine (7,692 inhabitants; 2,007 households)
Bouqachmir	291.05.05.	784	2877	
Brachoua	291.07.05.	2941	11851	
El Ganzra	291.03.09.	3015	13792	
Ezzhiliga	291.07.07.	3676	14788	Urban centre: Ezzhiliga (4,421 inhabitants; 1,243 households)
Houderrane	291.05.07.	1859	6049	
Jemaat Moul Blad	291.07.09.	1363	5051	
Khemis Sidi Yahya	291.09.09.	1819	6837	
Laghoualem	291.07.11.	2889	12051	
Maaziz	291.05.09.	3323	10812	Urban centre: Maaziz (8,250 inhabitants; 2,560 households)
Majmaa Tolba	291.03.11.	3925	15447	
Marchouch	291.07.13.	2604	13017	
Moulay Driss Aghbal	291.07.15.	1133	4583	
M'Qam Tolba	291.09.11.	3268	15070	
Oulmes	291.05.11.	5562	19579	Urban centre: Oulmes (14,308 inhabitants; 4,178 households)
Sfassif	291.03.13.	1807	7071	
Sidi Abderrazak	291.09.13.	3671	14021	
Sidi Allal Lamsadder	291.03.15.	1882	6875	
Sidi El Ghandour	291.03.17.	2089	7644	
Tiddas	291.05.13.	2795	9013	Urban centre: Tiddas (3,313 inhabitants; 1,110 households)

=== Municipalities ===
Name	Geographic code	Households (2024)	Population (2024)
Khemisset	291.01.01.	34344	125834
Rommani	291.01.03.	3037	11117
Sidi Allal El Bahraoui	291.01.17.	7438	29147
Tiflet	291.01.05.	26927	103850

== Khénifra Province ==
=== Rural communes ===
Name	Geographic code	Households (2024)	Population (2024)	Notes
Aguelmam Azegza	301.05.01.	1716	6781	
Aguelmous	301.07.03.	9374	36560	Urban centre: Aguelmous (17,371 inhabitants; 4,777 households)
Ait Ishaq	301.03.01.	4975	17847	Urban centre: Ait Ishaq (11,832 inhabitants; 3,498 households)
Ait Saadelli	301.03.03.	634	2629	
El Borj	301.05.05.	844	3266	
El Hammam	301.07.07.	2567	9697	Urban centre: Thighza (1,701 inhabitants; 471 households)
El Kbab	301.03.05.	3880	14580	Urban centre: El Kbab (7,874 inhabitants; 2,324 households)
Had Bouhssoussen	301.07.09.	1879	7303	Urban centre: Had Bouhssoussen (3,899 inhabitants; 1,079 households)
Kerrouchen	301.03.07.	1736	6796	Urban centre: Kerrouchen (2,399 inhabitants; 696 households)
Lehri	301.05.11.	2113	8669	
Moha Ou Hammou Zayani	301.05.13.	2763	10444	
Moulay Bouazza	301.07.15.	2223	7621	Urban centre: Moulay Bouazza (4,835 inhabitants; 1,546 households)
Ouaoumana	301.03.09.	2483	8850	Urban centre: Ouaoumana (5,774 inhabitants; 1,728 households)
Oum Rabia	301.07.17.	1959	7821	
Sebt Ait Rahou	301.07.19.	2125	8018	
Sidi Amar	301.05.21.	468	1625	
Sidi Hcine	301.07.23.	576	2510	
Sidi Lamine	301.05.25.	4279	16501	Urban centre: Kahf Nssar (8,955 inhabitants; 2,415 households)
Sidi Yahya Ou Saad	301.03.11.	1737	6911	
Tighassaline	301.03.13.	4399	15788	Urban centre: Tighassaline (9,980 inhabitants; 2,931 households)

=== Municipalities ===
Name	Geographic code	Households (2024)	Population (2024)
Khenifra	301.01.01.	34147	123738
M'Rirt	301.01.05.	13282	46285

== Kelaat Sraghna Province ==
=== Rural communes ===
Name	Geographic code	Households (2024)	Population (2024)	Notes
Assahrij	191.09.01.	3425	16313	Urban centre: Assahrij (2,069 inhabitants; 489 households)
Bouya Omar	191.05.03.	3344	14701	
Choara	191.05.05.	2569	12249	
Chtaiba	191.13.01.	1881	8491	
Dzouz	191.05.07.	2530	11527	
Eddachra	191.13.03.	1642	6939	
El Aamria	191.13.05.	1891	8625	
El Marbouh	191.11.07.	2104	9468	
Errafiaya	191.13.09.	1098	4903	
Fraita	191.05.09.	2543	10721	
Hiadna	191.11.11.	2482	12870	
Jbiel	191.07.11.	2350	10593	
Jouala	191.07.13.	2274	10283	
Laatamna	191.05.15.	2086	9318	
Laattaouia Ech-Chaybia	191.05.16.	1295	5910	
Loued Lakhdar	191.09.17.	2121	9125	
Lounasda	191.11.13.	2248	10866	
Mayate	191.11.15.	2404	11443	
M'Zem Sanhaja	191.09.19.	2164	10946	
Ouargui	191.05.21.	2395	10788	
Oulad Aamer	191.13.17.	1451	6996	
Oulad Aarrad	191.05.23.	1455	6065	
Oulad Bouali Loued	191.13.19.	1433	6302	
Oulad Cherki	191.11.21.	1485	7185	
Oulad El Garne	191.11.23.	1672	7728	
Oulad Khallouf	191.09.25.	1908	9172	
Oulad Massaoud	191.13.25.	1039	4188	
Oulad Msabbel	191.13.27.	1243	6216	
Oulad Sbih	191.11.29.	1533	6513	
Oulad Yaacoub	191.11.31.	1547	6791	
Oulad Zarrad	191.11.33.	2765	13243	
Sidi Aissa Ben Slimane	191.09.27.	4236	19164	
Sidi El Hattab	191.13.35.	1919	9638	
Sidi Moussa	191.13.37.	1773	8600	
Sour El Aaz	191.09.29.	856	3755	
Taouzint	191.13.39.	1214	5217	
Zemrane	191.07.31.	3189	14995	
Zemrane Charqia	191.07.33.	6284	29569	
Znada	191.11.41.	1689	7230	

=== Municipalities ===
Name	Geographic code	Households (2024)	Population (2024)
El Kelaâ Des Sraghna	191.01.03.	26083	106418
Laattaouia	191.01.05.	8610	38405
Sidi Rahhal	191.01.07.	2340	10276
Tamallalt	191.01.09.	4591	20528

== Kénitra Province ==
=== Rural communes ===
Name	Geographic code	Households (2024)	Population (2024)	Notes
Ameur Seflia	281.03.01.	7486	37935	
Arbaoua	281.07.01.	7545	35077	Urban centre: Arbaoua (4,478 inhabitants; 1,164 households)
Bahhara Oulad Ayad	281.09.01.	7159	38611	
Beni Malek	281.07.03.	5378	28711	
Ben Mansour	281.05.03.	9027	53545	
Chouafaa	281.11.03.	3872	21374	
Haddada	281.03.05.	4694	22652	
Kariat Ben Aouda	281.07.05.	2273	11238	
Lalla Mimouna	281.11.05.	7381	35600	Urban centre: Lalla Mimouna (19,644 inhabitants; 4,374 households)
Mnasra	281.05.07.	7731	41434	
Mograne	281.05.09.	6745	36452	
Moulay Bousselham	281.11.07.	7358	32643	Urban centre: Moulay Bousselham (8,642 inhabitants; 2,224 households)
Oued El Makhazine	281.07.07.	1650	6264	
Oulad Slama	281.03.11.	4664	23848	
Sidi Allal Tazi	281.09.09.	4185	22266	Urban centre: Sidi Allal Tazi (6,892 inhabitants; 1,417 households)
Sidi Boubker El Haj	281.11.11.	4245	21610	
Sidi Mohamed Lahmar	281.09.13.	9739	52679	
Souk Tlet El Gharb	281.09.15.	4832	24190	

=== Municipalities ===
Name	Geographic code	Households (2024)	Population (2024)	Notes
Kenitra	281.01.01.	138708	507736	
Mehdya	281.01.05.	16071	58558	
Sidi Taibi	281.01.13.	18599	76227	Urban centre: Sidi Taibi (67,255 inhabitants; 16,455 households)
Souk El Arbaa	281.01.11.	16401	70894	

== Larache Province ==
=== Rural communes ===
Name	Geographic code	Households (2024)	Population (2024)	Notes
Ayacha	331.09.01.	1775	6925	
Bni Arouss	331.09.03.	1971	7337	
Bni Garfett	331.09.05.	2713	11311	
Bou Jedyane	331.07.01.	2639	9624	
Ksar Bjir	331.07.03.	4028	17182	
Laouamra	331.07.05.	8949	48253	Urban centre: Laouamra (9,941 inhabitants; 2,202 households)
Oulad Ouchih	331.11.03.	2765	13409	
Rissana Chamalia	331.11.07.	2797	12961	
Rissana Janoubia	331.11.09.	3814	19480	
Sahel	331.11.11.	4469	18258	Urban centre: Khemis Sahel (7,077 inhabitants; 1,753 households)
Souaken	331.11.12.	2699	12582	
Souk L'Qolla	331.07.11.	3176	13592	
Souk Tolba	331.11.13.	2894	12855	
Tatoft	331.07.15.	2317	8657	
Tazroute	331.09.13.	1354	5449	
Zaaroura	331.09.15.	2226	8615	
Zouada	331.07.17.	5050	25289	

=== Municipalities ===
Name	Geographic code	Households (2024)	Population (2024)
Ksar El Kebir	331.01.01.	33188	124701
Larache	331.01.03.	35818	133731

== Laâyoune Province ==
=== Rural communes ===
Name	Geographic code	Households (2024)	Population (2024)
Boukraa	321.03.01.	396	1171
Dcheira	321.03.03.	371	901
Foum El Oued	321.03.05.	513	1844

=== Municipalities ===
Name	Geographic code	Households (2024)	Population (2024)
El Marsa	321.01.01.	8396	28848
Laayoune	321.01.03.	64190	262791

== Marrakech Prefecture ==
=== Rural communes ===
Name	Geographic code	Households (2024)	Population (2024)	Notes
Agafay	351.05.01.	4213	17771	
Ait Imour	351.05.03.	3358	14603	
Alouidane	351.02.01.	8887	37450	
Harbil	351.03.03.	24609	105790	Urban centre: Tamensourte (68,285 inhabitants; 16,209 households)
Loudaya	351.05.05.	9083	41761	Urban centre: Loudaya (15,967 inhabitants; 3,784 households)
M'Nabha	351.03.05.	2900	13565	Urban centre: Kettara (1,186 inhabitants; 311 households)
Ouahat Sidi Brahim	351.02.07.	8393	36493	Urban centre: Oulad Belaaguid (19,256 inhabitants; 4,357 households)
Oulad Hassoune	351.02.09.	6333	27314	
Ouled Dlim	351.03.11.	2978	14468	
Saada	351.07.07.	21819	91903	
Sid Zouine	351.05.09.	4132	17130	Urban centre: Sid Zouine (14,966 inhabitants; 3,579 households)
Souihla	351.07.11.	7246	32506	

=== Municipalities ===
Name	Geographic code	Households (2024)	Population (2024)
Mechouar Kasba	351.01.01.	3345	12116
Tassoultante	351.01.13.	26168	106013

=== Arrondissements of Marrakesh ===
Name	Geographic code	Households (2024)	Population (2024)
Annakhil	351.01.03.	17531	71506
Gueliz	351.01.05.	68658	219863
Marrakech-Medina	351.01.07.	21660	81103
Menara	351.01.09.	135189	522259
Sidi Youssef Ben Ali	351.01.11.	25887	107966

== M'diq-Fnideq Prefecture ==
=== Municipalities ===
Name	Geographic code	Households (2024)	Population (2024)
Allyene	573.01.07.	2131	8111
Belyounech	573.01.09.	1221	5208
Fnideq	573.01.01.	20061	77250
Martil	573.01.03.	26886	95896
M'Diq	573.01.05.	17498	67599

== Meknes Prefecture ==
=== Rural communes ===
Name	Geographic code	Households (2024)	Population (2024)	Notes
Ain Jemaa	061.03.01.	2918	14557	Urban centre: Ain Jemaa (4,311 inhabitants; 662 households)
Ain Karma-Oued Rommane	061.03.02.	3,254	13986	Urban centre: Ain Karma (5,551 inhabitants; 1,307 households)
Ain Orma	061.03.05.	889	3341	
Ait Ouallal	061.03.07.	5047	19079	Urban centre: El Fath Ait Ouallal (14,417 inhabitants; 3,842 households)
Charqaoua	061.07.01.	1141	4727	
Dar Oum Soltane	061.03.09.	1496	11609	
Dkhissa	061.05.01.	6574	28296	Urban centre: Zoualet (14,249 inhabitants; 3,250 households)
Majjate	061.05.03.	4909	20698	
M'Haya	061.05.05.	6424	30060	Urban centre: M'haya (6,965 inhabitants; 1,634 households)
Mrhassiyine	061.07.05.	2175	8355	
N'Zalat Bni Amar	061.07.07.	2062	7672	Urban centre: N'zalat (996 inhabitants; 305 households)
Oualili	061.07.09.	2366	9009	
Oued Jdida	061.05.07.	3736	16379	Urban centre: Oued Jdida (4,059 inhabitants; 995 households)
Sidi Abdallah Al Khayat	061.07.11.	2474	12158	
Sidi Slimane Moul Al Kifane	061.05.09.	5016	20427	Urban centre: Haj Kaddour (7,150 inhabitants; 1,881 households)

=== Municipalities ===
Name	Geographic code	Households (2024)	Population (2024)
Al Machouar - Stinia	061.01.03.	1065	5009
Boufakrane	061.01.05.	4093	16892
Meknes	061.01.01.	154528	551503
Moulay Driss Zerhoun	061.01.09.	2947	10038
Ouislane	061.01.11.	27967	112180
Toulal	061.01.07.	7215	26970

== Midelt Province ==
=== Rural communes ===
Name	Geographic code	Households (2024)	Population (2024)	Notes
Aghbalou	363.05.01.	2606	10296	Urban centre: Aghbalou Nssardane (3,219 inhabitants; 917 households)
Agoudim	363.17.03.	762	3826	
Ait Ayach	363.07.05.	2773	12932	
Ait Ben Yacoub	363.07.07.	1044	3743	
Ait Izdeg	363.07.09.	1642	7794	
Ait Yahya	363.15.01.	763	4293	
Amersid	363.07.11.	1356	6023	
Amouguer	363.15.03.	888	4363	
Anemzi	363.17.13.	1022	5140	
Bou Azmou	363.15.05.	2026	10100	
En-Nzala	363.09.01.	1012	4873	
Gourrama	363.09.03.	3379	15952	Urban centre: Gourrama (8,829 inhabitants; 1,998 households)
Guers Tiaallaline	363.09.05.	3106	15019	
Guir	363.09.07.	929	4363	
Imilchil	363.15.07.	2056	9164	
Itzer	363.07.17.	2946	10513	Urban centre: Itzer (5,700 inhabitants; 1,709 households)
Mibladen	363.07.19.	739	3052	
M'Zizel	363.09.09.	1561	7502	
Outerbat	363.15.09.	1372	6763	
Sidi Aayad	363.09.11.	2440	11562	
Sidi Yahya Ou Youssef	363.05.21.	1109	4877	
Tanourdi	363.05.23.	621	2834	
Tizi N'Ghachou	363.05.25.	627	2836	
Tounfite	363.17.27.	3301	13424	Urban centre: Tounfite (8,906 inhabitants; 2,354 households)
Zaida	363.07.29.	3696	14454	Urban centre: Zaida (8,503 inhabitants; 2,234 households)
Zaouiat Sidi Hamza	363.09.13.	934	5248	

=== Municipalities ===
Name	Geographic code	Households (2024)	Population (2024)	Notes
Boumia	363.01.15.	5879	21713	Urban centre: Boumia (19,433 inhabitants; 5,347 households)
Er-Rich	363.01.07.	6894	28462	
Midelt	363.01.03.	16225	62648	

== Mohammedia Prefecture ==
=== Rural communes ===
Name	Geographic code	Households (2024)	Population (2024)
Sidi Moussa Ben Ali	371.03.05.	3149	12973
Sidi Moussa Majdoub	371.03.07.	7614	30254

=== Municipalities ===
Name	Geographic code	Households (2024)	Population (2024)	Notes
Aïn Harrouda	371.01.03.	15533	60804	
Bni Yakhlef	371.01.05.	31669	117653	Urban centre: Bni Yakhlef (89,531 inhabitants; 24,665 households)
Ech-Challalate	371.01.07.	24562	98015	Urban centre: Ech-challalate (52,622 inhabitants; 13,201 households)
Mohammedia	371.01.01.	54738	194358	

== Moulay Yacoub Province ==
=== Rural communes ===
Name	Geographic code	Households (2024)	Population (2024)
Ain Bou Ali	591.05.01.	2639	12354
Ain Kansra	591.05.02.	3277	14910
Laajajra	591.05.03.	2985	14715
Louadaine	591.05.05.	2515	11523
Mikkes	591.03.03.	1305	6145
Oulad Mimoun	591.05.07.	2054	9399
Sebaa Rouadi	591.03.05.	5783	26750
Sebt Loudaya	591.03.07.	2333	11984
Sidi Daoud	591.05.09.	2686	13088

=== Municipalities ===
Name	Geographic code	Households (2024)	Population (2024)	Notes
Ain Chkef	591.01.03.	19657	91541	Urban centre: Ras El Mae (37,142 inhabitants; 7,019 households)
Moulay Yacoub	591.01.01.	1114	4545	

== Mediouna Province ==
=== Municipalities ===
Name	Geographic code	Households (2024)	Population (2024)
Al Majjatia Oulad Taleb	355.01.07.	24555	95457
Lahraouyine	355.01.01.	23054	87977
Mediouna	355.01.03.	7627	29972
Sidi Hajjaj Oued Hassar	355.01.09.	19027	76362
Tit Mellil	355.01.05.	13927	56019

== Nador Province ==
=== Rural communes ===
Name	Geographic code	Households (2024)	Population (2024)	Notes
Afsou	381.07.01.	457	2020	
Al Barkanyene	381.07.03.	632	2278	
Arekmane	381.07.05.	4424	16477	Urban centre: Kariat Arekmane (4,602 inhabitants; 1,307 households)
Bni Bouifrour	381.05.01.	1683	6846	
Bni Chiker	381.05.03.	5845	22763	Urban centre: Bni Chiker (4,825 inhabitants; 1,162 households)
Bni Oukil Oulad M'Hand	381.07.07.	3302	14691	
Bni Sidel Jbel	381.05.05.	2136	8199	
Bni Sidel Louta	381.05.07.	1387	5366	
Bouarg	381.05.09.	10534	44626	
Hassi Berkane	381.07.09.	1713	7465	
Iaazzanene	381.05.13.	2925	12706	
Ihaddadene	381.05.15.	3892	15667	Urban centre: Bouizazarene Ihaddadene (13,763 inhabitants; 3,459 households)
Iksane	381.05.17.	1967	7731	
Oulad Daoud Zkhanine	381.07.11.	909	3149	
Oulad Settout	381.07.13.	5981	26052	
Tiztoutine	381.07.17.	2360	9349	Urban centre: Tiztoutine (4,586 inhabitants; 1,179 households)

=== Municipalities ===
Name	Geographic code	Households (2024)	Population (2024)
Al Aaroui	381.01.01.	11844	46540
Bni Ansar	381.01.03.	13404	50508
Nador	381.01.05.	43049	158202
Ras El Ma	381.01.15.	2077	7527
Selouane	381.01.19.	7568	29628
Zaio	381.01.07.	9646	36766
Zeghanghane	381.01.09.	8355	31431

== Nouaceur Province ==
=== Rural communes ===
Name	Geographic code	Households (2024)	Population (2024)	Notes

=== Municipalities ===
Name	Geographic code	Households (2024)	Population (2024)	Notes
Bouskoura	385.01.01.	55578	200359	
Dar Bouazza	385.01.02.	82747	302970	
Nouaceur	385.01.03.	9008	36326	
Oulad Salah	385.01.05.	13524	51621	Urban centre: Victoria (33,185 inhabitants; 8,894 households)

== Ouarzazate Province ==
=== Rural communes ===
Name	Geographic code	Households (2024)	Population (2024)	Notes
Ait Zineb	401.03.01.	2334	10530	
Amerzgane	401.03.03.	1985	8765	
Iznaguen	401.03.05.	2666	11953	
Ghassate	401.07.01.	1431	7169	
Idelsane	401.07.03.	1840	8680	
Ighrem N'Ougdal	401.03.07.	3026	13727	
Imi N'Oulaoune	401.07.05.	3536	19734	
Khouzama	401.03.09.	1672	7401	
Ouisselsate	401.03.11.	2884	12471	
Siroua	401.03.13.	2030	8586	
Skoura Ahl El Oust	401.07.07.	4879	24053	Urban centre: Skoura (4,576 inhabitants; 1,087 households)
Tarmigt	401.07.09.	10058	46963	Urban centre: Tabounte (37,465 inhabitants; 7,902 households)
Telouet	401.03.15.	2655	12396	
Tidli	401.03.17.	3089	14841	
Toundoute	401.07.11.	2028	10177	

=== Municipalities ===
Name	Geographic code	Households (2024)	Population (2024)
Ouarzazate	401.01.07.	18297	79218
Taznakht	401.01.09.	2010	8268

== Oued Ed-Dahab Province ==
=== Rural communes ===
Name	Geographic code	Households (2024)	Population (2024)
Bir Anzarane	391.05.01.	925	2962
El Argoub	391.09.01.	4177	12182
Gleibat El Foula	391.05.03.	20	7155
Imlili	391.09.03.	1039	3345
Mijik	391.05.05.	168	646
Oum Dreyga	391.05.07.	10	3714

=== Municipalities ===
Name	Geographic code	Households (2024)	Population (2024)
Dakhla	391.01.01.	45401	165463

== Ouezzane Province ==
=== Rural communes ===
Name	Geographic code	Households (2024)	Population (2024)	Notes
Ain Beida	405.09.01.	2690	10368	
Asjen	405.09.03.	3048	11479	
Bni Quolla	405.07.01.	3752	13551	
Brikcha	405.09.05.	2508	8777	Urban centre: Brikcha (1,156 inhabitants; 388 households)
Kalaat Bouqorra	405.11.07.	3767	13999	
Lamjaara	405.13.03.	4579	19162	Urban centre: Ain Dorij (4,852 inhabitants; 1,319 households)
Masmouda	405.07.05.	4006	14594	
Moqrisset	405.09.09.	2585	9413	Urban centre: Moqrissat (2,007 inhabitants; 548 households)
Mzefroune	405.07.07.	1798	6226	
Ounnana	405.13.09.	3185	12123	
Sidi Ahmed Cherif	405.13.11.	2171	7913	
Sidi Bousber	405.13.13.	2696	9671	
Sidi Redouane	405.07.15.	5124	17903	Urban centre: Sidi Redouane (4,112 inhabitants; 1,124 households)
Teroual	405.13.17.	3322	11673	
Zghira	405.13.19.	3637	13415	
Zoumi	405.11.11.	9762	36573	Urban centre: Zoumi (4,662 inhabitants; 1,407 households)

=== Municipalities ===
Name	Geographic code	Households (2024)	Population (2024)
Ouezzane	405.01.09.	16266	57737

== Oujda-Angad Prefecture ==
=== Rural communes ===
Name	Geographic code	Households (2024)	Population (2024)
Ahl Angad	411.03.01.	4292	18051
Ain Sfa	411.03.03.	1039	4426
Bni Khaled	411.03.05.	1456	6239
Bsara	411.03.07.	325	1335
Isly	411.05.09.	1831	10256
Mestferki	411.05.11.	1023	4335
Sidi Boulenouar	411.05.17.	776	3600
Sidi Moussa Lemhaya	411.05.19.	1005	6062

=== Municipalities ===
Name	Geographic code	Households (2024)	Population (2024)
Bni Drar	411.01.11.	2595	10907
Naima	411.01.19.	257	1019
Oujda	411.01.23.	134330	506224

== Rabat Prefecture ==
=== Municipalities ===
Name	Geographic code	Households (2024)	Population (2024)
Touarga	421.01.07.	785	5703

=== Arrondissements of Rabat ===
Name	Geographic code	Households (2024)	Population (2024)
Agdal Riyad	421.01.01.	24248	70435
El Youssoufia	421.01.03.	45900	157587
Hassan	421.01.05.	32327	92454
Souissi	421.01.06.	6431	21049
Yacoub El Mansour	421.01.09.	47492	168391

== Rehamna Province ==
=== Rural communes ===
Name	Geographic code	Households (2024)	Population (2024)	Notes
Ait Hammou	427.07.01.	1463	7211	
Ait Taleb	427.07.03.	1669	8075	
Akarma	427.09.01.	899	4795	
Bouchane	427.07.05.	2109	9610	
Bourrous	427.09.03.	1362	6316	
Jaafra	427.07.07.	2200	10689	
Jaidate	427.09.05.	2912	13193	
Labrikiyne	427.07.09.	2433	12185	
Lamharra	427.09.07.	2056	9476	
Nzalat Laadam	427.09.09.	3460	19635	
Oulad Aamer Tizmarine	427.07.11.	1025	4533	
Oulad Hassoune Hamri	427.07.13.	1565	7792	
Oulad Imloul	427.09.11.	2224	9659	
Ras Ain Rhamna	427.09.13.	3362	16330	
Sidi Abdallah	427.07.15.	2116	9447	
Sidi Ali Labrahla	427.07.17.	1422	6718	
Sidi Boubker	427.09.15.	1207	5728	
Sidi Ghanem	427.07.19.	1747	8039	
Sidi Mansour	427.07.21.	1022	4766	
Skhour Rhamna	427.07.23.	3681	15565	Urban centre: Skhour Rhamna (6,283 inhabitants; 1,559 households)
Skoura Lhadra	427.07.25.	1752	7877	
Tlauh	427.09.19.	2001	9596	

=== Municipalities ===
Name	Geographic code	Households (2024)	Population (2024)
Benguerir	427.01.01.	27167	114872
Sidi Bou Othmane	427.01.17.	2821	12490

== Safi Province ==
=== Rural communes ===
Name	Geographic code	Households (2024)	Population (2024)	Notes
Atouabet	431.07.01.	2393	10378	
Ayir	431.09.01.	6709	30870	Urban centre: Laakarta (5,297 inhabitants; 1,179 households)
Bouguedra	431.03.01.	3592	15707	Urban centre: Bouguedra (2,218 inhabitants; 571 households)
Dar Si Aissa	431.09.03.	2623	11949	
El Beddouza	431.09.05.	3132	14278	
El Ghiate	431.07.03.	5300	23109	
El Gouraani	431.03.03.	2446	10859	
Hrara	431.09.07.	6676	30025	Urban centre: Hrara (1,993 inhabitants; 356 households)
Khatazakane	431.07.05.	4000	16691	
Laamamra	431.07.07.	2706	12025	
Labkhati	431.03.05.	3052	13731	
Lahdar	431.03.07.	2974	12809	
Lamaachate	431.07.09.	3945	15830	
Lamrasla	431.03.09.	3933	17997	
Lamsabih	431.03.11.	2404	10443	
Moul El Bergui	431.09.09.	3436	18856	
Nagga	431.07.11.	4926	21996	
Oulad Salmane	431.07.13.	3889	16457	
Saadla	431.09.15.	4040	18134	
Sidi Aissa	431.03.13.	2241	9528	
Sidi Ettiji	431.03.15.	3650	17197	

=== Municipalities ===
Name	Geographic code	Households (2024)	Population (2024)
Jamaat Shaim	431.01.09.	2915	11865
Safi	431.01.03.	85929	323888
Sebt Gzoula	431.01.11.	6002	24600

== Salé Prefecture ==
=== Rural communes ===
Name	Geographic code	Households (2024)	Population (2024)	Notes
Shoul	441.01.11.	5188	24913	
Ameur	441.01.13.	18540	75942	Urban centre: Ameur (23,971 inhabitants; 5,955 households)

=== Arrondissements of Salé ===
Name	Geographic code	Households (2024)	Population (2024)
Bab Lamrissa	441.01.03.	48307	167319
Bettana	441.01.05.	21404	76233
Hssaine	441.01.06.	63823	234326
Layayda	441.01.07.	57358	229838
Tabriquet	441.01.09.	65252	237385

=== Municipalities ===
Name	Geographic code	Households (2024)	Population (2024)
Sidi Bouknadel	441.01.08.	10439	43598

== Sefrou Province ==
=== Rural communes ===
Name	Geographic code	Households (2024)	Population (2024)	Notes
Adrej	451.03.01.	374	1216	
Aghbalou Aqorar	451.07.01.	2451	9920	
Ahl Sidi Lahcen	451.07.03.	964	3566	
Ain Cheggag	451.05.01.	6769	28584	Urban centre: Ain Cheggag (16,160 inhabitants; 3,931 households)
Ain Timguenai	451.03.03.	1750	6598	Urban centre: Zaouiat Bougrine (4,289 inhabitants; 1,144 households)
Ait Sebaa Lajrouf	451.05.03.	4603	18701	
Azzaba	451.07.05.	1623	6128	
Bir Tam Tam	451.03.05.	2426	8954	
Dar El Hamra	451.03.07.	1026	3540	
Ighzrane	451.03.09.	2271	8498	
Kandar Sidi Khiar	451.07.07.	2303	10417	
Laanoussar	451.07.09.	2195	9285	
Mtarnagha	451.03.11.	1110	4056	
Oulad Mkoudou	451.03.13.	1658	5872	
Ras Tabouda	451.03.15.	1629	6022	
Sidi Youssef Ben Ahmed	451.07.11.	3513	13748	
Tafajight	451.03.17.	326	1397	
Tazouta	451.07.13.	1523	5804	

=== Municipalities ===
Name	Geographic code	Households (2024)	Population (2024)
Bhalil	451.01.01.	3982	13727
El Menzel	451.01.03.	3241	11400
Imouzzer Kandar	451.01.05.	5942	21943
Ahermoumou	451.01.07.	4958	18469
Sefrou	451.01.09.	24625	86903

== Settat Province ==
=== Rural communes ===
Name	Geographic code	Households (2024)	Population (2024)	Notes
Ain Blal	461.07.01.	886	3992	
Ain Dorbane-Lahlaf	461.11.02.	1765	9151	
Bni Khloug	461.07.03.	2646	12092	
Bni Yagrine	461.17.03.	2361	13099	
Bouguargouh	461.11.03.	2017	9718	
Dar Chaffai	461.07.05.	3639	17411	
Gdana	461.15.05.	1906	8462	
Guisser	461.17.07.	2835	12189	Urban centre: Guisser (2,917 inhabitants; 721 households)
Khemisset Chaouia	461.15.09.	1182	5104	
Lahouaza	461.15.11.	1515	7018	
Lakhzazra	461.11.07.	1629	7455	
Laqraqra	461.07.07.	2073	10493	
Machraa Ben Abbou	461.17.13.	2106	9331	
Meskoura	461.07.09.	1186	6159	
M'Garto	461.11.13.	1764	7508	
Mniaa	461.13.09.	2281	11088	
Mrizigue	461.13.11.	1738	7926	
Mzoura	461.15.15.	2090	8426	
N'Khila	461.11.15.	2653	12787	
Oued Naanaa	461.13.17.	1506	7075	
Oulad Amer	461.07.11.	1104	5871	
Oulad Bouali Nouaja	461.07.13.	1160	5393	
Oulad Chbana	461.13.19.	1964	9513	
Oulad Fares	461.13.21.	2537	12096	
Oulad Fares El Halla	461.07.15.	572	2521	
Oulad Freiha	461.07.17.	2313	11410	
Oulad M'Hamed	461.11.23.	2091	9081	
Oulad Said	461.15.19.	2027	8745	Urban centre: Oulad Said (2,349 inhabitants; 559 households)
Oulad Sghir	461.17.21.	2748	13153	
Ras El Ain Chaouia	461.13.25.	3134	14244	Urban centre: Ras El Ain (3,561 inhabitants; 832 households)
Rima	461.17.23.	1827	8203	
Sgamna	461.13.27.	1916	9427	
Sidi Abdelkrim	461.11.29.	2839	13759	
Sidi Ahmed El Khadir	461.07.19.	1773	9731	
Sidi Boumehdi	461.07.21.	837	4150	
Sidi Dahbi	461.11.31.	1996	8972	
Sidi El Aidi	461.15.25.	3062	14165	
Sidi Hajjaj	461.13.33.	4566	22360	
Sidi Mohammed Ben Rahal	461.17.27.	2223	10511	
Toualet	461.17.31.	2317	11822	

=== Municipalities ===
Name	Geographic code	Households (2024)	Population (2024)
Ben Ahmed	461.01.01.	8161	33469
El Borouj	461.01.05.	4457	19438
Loulad	461.01.09.	1350	5772
Oulad M'Rah	461.01.13.	1927	8027
Settat	461.01.15.	45185	171556

== Sidi Bennour Province ==
=== Rural communes ===
Name	Geographic code	Households (2024)	Population (2024)	Notes
Bni Hilal	467.03.01.	4000	16767	
Bni Tsiriss	467.03.03.	2850	12794	
Bouhmame	467.07.05.	4993	23637	
Jabria	467.07.07.	4503	21071	
Khmis Ksiba	467.03.09.	1104	5249	
Koudiat Bni Dghough	467.05.11.	3289	15550	
Kridid	467.05.13.	3054	14259	Urban centre: Sebt Lamaarif (1,850 inhabitants; 414 households)
Laagagcha	467.05.15.	3220	14059	
Laamria	467.03.17.	2181	9957	
Laaounate	467.03.19.	4191	17486	Urban centre: Laaounate (6,291 inhabitants; 1,539 households)
Laatatra	467.07.21.	4040	18928	
Laghnadra	467.11.01.	7654	34680	
Lgharbia	467.11.03.	4891	22622	
Lmechrek	467.07.23.	3450	15770	
Metrane	467.03.25.	2127	9201	
M'Tal	467.07.27.	2161	8773	
Oulad Amrane	467.05.29.	2650	12059	Urban centre: Oulad Amrane (2,190 inhabitants; 520 households)
Oulad Boussaken	467.03.31.	1367	5962	
Oulad Sbaita	467.11.07.	5526	25231	
Oulad Si Bouhya	467.07.33.	3850	18535	
Saniat Berguig	467.11.09.	6447	28361	
Tamda	467.05.35.	2076	9043	

=== Municipalities ===
Name	Geographic code	Households (2024)	Population (2024)	Notes
Loualidia	467.01.05.	5048	21742	Urban centre: Loualidia (9,789 inhabitants; 2,459 households)
Sidi Bennour	467.01.07.	13912	56201	
Zemamra	467.01.09.	3413	13993	

== Sidi Ifni Province ==
=== Rural communes ===
Name	Geographic code	Households (2024)	Population (2024)
Ait Erkha	473.07.01.	1166	4490
Anfeg	473.07.03.	1220	3803
Arbaa Ait Abdellah	473.05.01.	679	2671
Boutrouch	473.07.05.	734	2693
Ibdar	473.07.07.	978	3323
Imi N'Fast	473.05.03.	449	1962
Mesti	473.05.05.	731	2533
Sbouya	473.05.09.	703	2772
Sebt Ennabour	473.07.09.	1512	6047
Sidi Abdallah Ou Belaid	473.07.11.	938	3524
Sidi H'Saine Ou Ali	473.07.13.	1321	4769
Sidi M'Bark	473.07.15.	1324	4898
Tangarfa	473.05.11.	1021	3895
Tighirt	473.07.17.	1614	5840
Tioughza	473.05.13.	2690	10007
Tnine Amellou	473.05.15.	831	3247

=== Municipalities ===
Name	Geographic code	Households (2024)	Population (2024)	Notes
Lakhsas	473.01.01.	1474	5603	
Mirleft	473.01.07.	2767	9828	Urban centre: Mirleft (7,257 inhabitants; 2,096 households)
Sidi Ifni	473.01.03.	6387	22696	

== Sidi Kacem Province ==
=== Rural communes ===
Name	Geographic code	Households (2024)	Population (2024)	Notes
Ain Dfali	481.03.01.	5659	23018	
Al Haouafate	481.05.01.	3961	18528	
Bab Tiouka	481.09.01.	1647	7626	
Bir Taleb	481.09.03.	2556	11843	
Bni Oual	481.03.03.	1618	6623	
Chbanate	481.09.05.	2246	10303	
Dar Laaslouji	481.11.03.	7170	36072	
Rmilat	481.11.05.	3572	19117	
Khnichet	481.07.05.	6193	26246	Urban centre: Khnichet (11,860 inhabitants; 2,938 households)
Lamrabih	481.07.07.	4592	20154	
Moulay Abdelkader	481.03.09.	1720	7740	
Nouirate	481.05.07.	5603	26833	
Oulad Nouel	481.07.11.	2670	11578	
Sefsaf	481.05.09.	5201	28106	
Selfat	481.09.07.	2127	10366	
Sidi Ahmed Benaissa	481.03.13.	1649	7685	
Sidi Al Kamel	481.11.11.	6472	34016	
Sidi Ameur Al Hadi	481.03.15.	2352	11703	
Sidi Azzouz	481.03.17.	3188	14484	
Sidi M'Hamed Chelh	481.07.19.	1780	7977	
Taoughilt	481.07.21.	3309	15013	
Tekna	481.09.09.	1425	7396	
Zaggota	481.09.11.	2159	10245	
Zirara	481.09.13.	3928	16829	Urban centre: Zirara (8,223 inhabitants; 1,981 households)

=== Municipalities ===
Name	Geographic code	Households (2024)	Population (2024)
Dar Gueddari	481.01.01.	1728	7826
Had Kourt	481.01.03.	2111	8554
Jorf El Melha	481.01.05.	7448	31976
Mechra Bel Ksiri	481.01.07.	8166	32615
Sidi-Kacem	481.01.11.	20288	75037

== Sidi Slimane Province ==
=== Rural communes ===
Name	Geographic code	Households (2024)	Population (2024)
Azghar	491.05.01.	2329	11707
Boumaiz	491.05.03.	5153	22693
Dar Bel Amri	491.05.05.	6780	32873
Kceibya	491.03.07.	6099	33007
M'Saada	491.05.09.	4584	22399
Oulad Ben Hammadi	491.05.11.	2896	13491
Oulad H'Cine	491.05.13.	7208	33227
Sfafaa	491.03.15.	4827	24744

== Skhirate-Témara Prefecture ==
=== Rural communes ===
Name	Geographic code	Households (2024)	Population (2024)	Notes
El Menzeh	501.03.01.	2162	7168	
Mers El Kheir	501.05.03.	6106	26544	Urban centre: Mers El Kheir (23,301 inhabitants; 5,432 households)
Oumazza	501.03.03.	1094	4322	
Sabbah	501.05.05.	3456	15552	
Sidi Yahya Zaer	501.03.11.	29368	116649	Urban centre: Sidi Yahya Zaer (12,315 inhabitants; 3,008 households)

=== Municipalities ===
Name	Geographic code	Households (2024)	Population (2024)
Ain Attig	501.01.09.	21033	73985
Aïn El Aouda	501.01.01.	23899	98502
Harhoura	501.01.03.	7021	20950
Skhirat	501.01.05.	32031	122705
Temara	501.01.07.	82146	297098

== Tan-Tan Province ==
=== Rural communes ===
Name	Geographic code	Households (2024)	Population (2024)
Abteh	521.05.01.	142	651
Ben Khlil	521.05.03.	102	951
Chbika	521.05.05.	93	277
Msied	521.03.01.	268	1501
Tilemzoun	521.03.03.	189	747

=== Municipalities ===
Name	Geographic code	Households (2024)	Population (2024)
El Ouatia	521.01.03.	3717	14258
Tan-Tan	521.01.01.	18797	76134

== Tanger-Assilah Prefecture ==
=== Rural communes ===
Name	Geographic code	Households (2024)	Population (2024)	Notes
Al Manzla	511.05.01.	629	2680	
Aquouass Briech	511.03.03.	1190	4981	
Sebt Azzinate	511.05.05.	1729	7265	
Dar Chaoui	511.05.07.	1078	4471	Urban centre: Dar Chaoui (1,494 inhabitants; 401 households)
Sahel Chamali	511.03.11.	1235	5028	
Sidi Lyamani	511.03.13.	2387	10616	Urban centre: Tnine Sidi Lyamani (1,031 inhabitants; 279 households)

=== Municipalities ===
Name	Geographic code	Households (2024)	Population (2024)
Assilah	511.01.01.	9745	36039
Gueznaia	511.01.09.	25039	88676

=== Arrondissements of Tangier ===
Name	Geographic code	Households (2024)	Population (2024)
Bni Makada	511.01.03.	150816	567465
Charf-Mghogha	511.01.05.	70679	252656
Charf-Souani	511.01.06.	33489	111772
Tanger-Medina	511.01.07.	107078	343535

== Taounate Province ==
=== Rural communes ===
Name	Geographic code	Households (2024)	Population (2024)	Notes
Aïn Aïcha	531.09.01.	5192	24723	Urban centre: Ain Aicha (8,103 inhabitants; 1,511 households)
Ain Legdah	531.09.03.	2601	10598	
Ain Maatouf	531.09.05.	2178	8639	
Ain Mediouna	531.07.01.	3779	15115	
Bni Oulid	531.07.03.	2525	8967	
Bni Ounjel Tafraout	531.07.05.	1456	5993	
Bni Snous	531.05.01.	1896	8479	
Bouadel	531.07.07.	2957	11564	
Bouarouss	531.09.07.	3596	16329	
Bouchabel	531.05.03.	3028	13767	
Bouhouda	531.07.09.	5746	24823	Urban centre: Bouhouda (3,496 inhabitants; 940 households)
El Bibane	531.03.01.	1623	5853	
El Bsabsa	531.09.09.	1608	7485	
Fennassa Bab El Hit	531.07.11.	2538	10285	
Galaz	531.03.03.	4132	15201	
Ghouazi	531.05.05.	3669	16405	
Jbabra	531.05.07.	3294	15904	
Khlalfa	531.07.13.	3584	14340	
Kissane	531.03.05.	3260	11763	
Loulja	531.05.09.	2904	13679	
Messassa	531.09.11.	1750	8195	
Mezraoua	531.07.15.	1921	7712	
Mkansa	531.05.11.	4942	23690	
Moulay Abdelkrim	531.05.13.	1556	6557	
Moulay Bouchta	531.05.15.	3133	12554	
Oudka	531.03.07.	2103	7380	
Oued Jemaa	531.09.13.	1698	7825	
Oulad Ayyad	531.09.15.	2186	9763	
Oulad Daoud	531.09.17.	2391	10800	
Ourtzagh	531.03.09.	3635	13256	Urban centre: Ourtzarh (2,075 inhabitants; 623 households)
Outabouabane	531.09.19.	1912	8560	
Ras El Oued	531.09.21.	2995	13299	
Ratba	531.03.11.	3848	14944	
Rghioua	531.07.17.	1130	3666	
Sidi El Abed	531.05.17.	2096	11240	
Sidi Haj M'Hamed	531.03.13.	2147	7880	
Sidi M'Hamed Ben Lahcen	531.09.23.	3485	16980	
Sidi Mokhfi	531.03.15.	1947	7915	
Sidi Yahya Bni Zeroual	531.03.17.	3654	14284	
Tabouda	531.03.19.	3422	13635	
Tafrant	531.03.21.	3387	13217	
Tamedit	531.07.19.	3124	12252	
Timezgana	531.03.23.	3644	15191	
Zrizer	531.07.21.	2106	7539	

=== Municipalities ===
Name	Geographic code	Households (2024)	Population (2024)
Ghafsai	531.01.01.	1894	7117
Karia Ba Mohamed	531.01.03.	5112	20859
Taounate	531.01.05.	10078	39114
Thar Es-Souk	531.01.07.	1406	5218
Tissa	531.01.09.	2783	12096

== Taourirt Province ==
=== Rural communes ===
Name	Geographic code	Households (2024)	Population (2024)
Ahl Oued Za	533.09.01.	2166	11024
Ain Lehjer	533.07.03.	1751	7692
El Atef	533.03.05.	183	933
Gteter	533.09.07.	1632	8222
Mechraa Hammadi	533.07.09.	1065	4343
Melg El Ouidane	533.09.11.	1786	8009
Mestegmer	533.07.13.	1245	5295
Oulad M'Hammed	533.03.15.	416	2316
Sidi Ali Belkassem	533.03.17.	2660	13951
Sidi Lahsen	533.03.19.	1386	6779
Tancherfi	533.07.21.	1320	6092

=== Municipalities ===
Name	Geographic code	Households (2024)	Population (2024)
Debdou	533.01.13.	1128	4447
El Aioun Sidi Mellouk	533.01.15.	9657	40652
Taourirt	533.01.33.	23633	100402

== Tarfaya Province ==
=== Rural communes ===
Name	Geographic code	Households (2024)	Population (2024)
Akhfennir	537.05.01.	822	2841
Daoura	537.03.03.	402	902
El Hagounia	537.03.05.	129	561
Tah	537.05.07.	253	894

=== Municipalities ===
Name	Geographic code	Households (2024)	Population (2024)
Tarfaya	537.01.05.	2722	11030

== Taroudant Province ==
=== Rural communes ===
Name	Geographic code	Households (2024)	Population (2024)
Adar	541.03.01.	1058	3043
Agadir Melloul	541.07.01.	1697	7518
Ahl Ramel	541.05.01.	1849	7496
Ahl Tifnoute	541.07.03.	1114	5196
Ahmar Laglalcha	541.11.01.	5069	21659
Ait Abdallah	541.03.03.	643	1635
Ait Igas	541.09.03.	2195	10378
Ait Makhlouf	541.09.05.	1035	4135
Amalou	541.03.05.	668	2188
Arazane	541.04.09.	1812	7883
Argana	541.11.03.	1023	4123
Askaouen	541.07.05.	1553	7046
Assads	541.05.05.	1058	3592
Assaisse	541.07.07.	1590	5934
Assaki	541.07.09.	1886	8048
Azaghar N'Irs	541.03.07.	1161	4009
Azrar	541.07.11.	1067	4242
Bigoudine	541.11.07.	1056	4174
Bounrar	541.09.11.	1302	4995
Eddir	541.11.09.	1732	7781
El Faid	541.04.13.	2616	10559
El Koudia El Beida	541.05.11.	5582	23666
Freija	541.09.15.	1998	9005
Ida Ou Gailal	541.04.17.	1459	6036
Ida Ougoummad	541.04.21.	1913	7543
Ida Ou Moumen	541.11.19.	1432	5833
Igli	541.04.23.	3061	13832
Igoudar Mnabha	541.04.25.	2567	10974
Iguidi	541.07.13.	1733	7949
Imaouen	541.03.09.	623	1969
Imilmaiss	541.11.13.	1186	4967
Imi N'Tayart	541.03.11.	379	973
Imoulass	541.09.27.	1757	6889
Issen	541.11.15.	3163	13254
Lagfifat	541.05.17.	4671	19471
Lakhnafif	541.05.19.	2470	10706
Lamhadi	541.05.21.	2768	11927
Lamhara	541.04.29.	2656	11622
Lamnizla	541.11.31.	856	3427
Machraa El Ain	541.05.23.	3021	12243
Nihit	541.03.13.	516	1456
Oualqadi	541.03.15.	527	1477
Oulad Aissa	541.04.33.	2636	11732
Ouneine	541.04.35.	1783	7042
Ouzioua	541.07.37.	1748	8141
Sidi Abdellah Ou Said	541.04.39.	788	3003
Sidi Ahmed Ou Abdallah	541.09.41.	1023	4038
Sidi Ahmed Ou Amar	541.05.25.	4134	17914
Sidi Boaal	541.03.17.	778	2180
Sidi Borja	541.09.43.	2541	10736
Sidi Boumoussa	541.05.27.	5558	23160
Sidi Dahmane	541.09.45.	3423	14878
Sidi Hsaine	541.07.15.	1675	6716
Sidi Moussa Lhamri	541.11.29.	3814	17673
Sidi Mzal	541.03.19.	497	1373
Sidi Ouaaziz	541.04.47.	2227	9241
Tabia	541.03.21.	353	814
Tafingoult	541.04.49.	1442	5670
Tafraouten	541.09.51.	1622	7026
Talgjount	541.04.53.	1280	5234
Talmakante	541.11.33.	798	3336
Tamaloukte	541.09.55.	1072	4241
Taouyalte	541.07.17.	1576	7097
Tassousfi	541.07.19.	1546	5998
Tataoute	541.03.23.	1135	3767
Tazemmourt	541.09.57.	1699	6856
Tidsi Nissendalene	541.05.33.	1295	4395
Tigouga	541.04.59.	922	3867
Tindine	541.03.25.	640	1853
Tinzart	541.04.61.	1391	6127
Tiout	541.09.63.	824	3017
Tisfane	541.03.27.	478	1414
Tisrasse	541.07.65.	1371	5608
Tizgzaouine	541.07.21.	1267	4653
Tizi N'Test	541.04.67.	956	3588
Toubkal	541.07.23.	1834	8538
Toufelaazt	541.03.29.	358	1061
Toughmart	541.04.69.	1497	5035
Toumliline	541.03.31.	530	1463
Zagmouzen	541.07.25.	1672	7480
Zaouia Sidi Tahar	541.11.71.	3148	13479

=== Municipalities ===
Name	Geographic code	Households (2024)	Population (2024)
Ait Iaaza	541.01.01.	4145	17339
Aoulouz	541.01.02.	4605	21502
El Guerdane	541.01.03.	3292	13747
Irherm	541.01.05.	1310	4127
Oulad Berhil	541.01.07.	7068	30330
Oulad Teima	541.01.09.	24494	100284
Taliouine	541.01.11.	1753	7040
Taroudannt	541.01.13.	21821	83496

== Tata Province ==
=== Rural communes ===
Name	Geographic code	Households (2024)	Population (2024)
Adis	551.07.01.	1271	6468
Aguinane	551.05.01.	620	2396
Ait Ouabelli	551.03.01.	617	2140
Akka Ighane	551.05.03.	1338	6045
Allougoum	551.05.05.	1505	8251
Ibn Yacoub	551.05.07.	660	2530
Issafen	551.07.03.	975	3031
Kasbat Sidi Abdellah Ben M'Barek	551.03.03.	1335	6840
Oum El Guerdane	551.07.05.	651	3143
Tagmout	551.07.07.	1219	4300
Tamanarte	551.03.05.	1499	4999
Tigzmerte	551.07.09.	902	3600
Tissint	551.05.09.	1756	8797
Tizaghte	551.07.11.	984	3356
Tizounine	551.03.07.	521	2008
Tlite	551.05.11.	926	4166

=== Municipalities ===
Name	Geographic code	Households (2024)	Population (2024)
Akka	551.01.01.	1337	5575
Fam El Hisn	551.01.03.	1294	5908
Foum Zguid	551.01.05.	1902	8660
Tata	551.01.07.	4218	19544

== Taza Province ==
=== Rural communes ===
Name	Geographic code	Households (2024)	Population (2024)	Notes
Ait Saghrouchen	561.09.01.	4098	15147	
Ajdir	561.03.01.	2288	8640	Urban centre: Ajdir (1,370 inhabitants; 381 households)
Bab Boudir	561.13.01.	1013	4209	
Bab Marzouka	561.13.03.	3995	17323	
Bni Frassen	561.07.01.	4668	19873	
Bni Ftah	561.11.01.	2363	9632	
Bni Lent	561.13.05.	2638	10801	
Bouchfaa	561.07.03.	2396	10093	
Bouhlou	561.07.05.	2007	8510	
Bourd	561.03.03.	1770	6996	
Bouyablane	561.09.03.	363	1667	
Brarha	561.11.03.	1462	6625	
El Gouzate	561.11.05.	1462	5942	
Galdamane	561.13.07.	4840	21732	
Ghiata Al Gharbia	561.07.07.	4703	22437	
Gzenaya Al Janoubia	561.03.05.	2081	8125	
Jbarna	561.03.07.	640	2328	
Kaf El Ghar	561.11.07.	1846	7060	
Maghraoua	561.13.15.	1664	6775	
Matmata	561.09.07.	2942	11665	Urban centre: Matmata (2,423 inhabitants; 641 households)
Meknassa Acharqia	561.13.09.	1288	5197	
Meknassa Al Gharbia	561.13.11.	832	3422	
Msila	561.11.09.	1957	7800	
Oulad Chrif	561.13.13.	1819	7882	
Oulad Zbair	561.07.09.	3716	17562	Urban centre: Oulad Zbair (6,687 inhabitants; 1,512 households)
Rbaa El Fouki	561.07.11.	1352	6156	
Sidi Ali Bourakba	561.03.09.	1698	6280	
Smià	561.09.09.	1893	7385	
Taifa	561.11.11.	1527	6000	
Tainaste	561.11.13.	2532	10411	Urban centre: Tainaste (1,539 inhabitants; 450 households)
Tazarine	561.09.11.	576	2030	
Tizi Ouasli	561.03.11.	1490	5436	Urban centre: Tizi Ouasli (1,677 inhabitants; 464 households)
Traiba	561.11.15.	1494	5773	
Zrarda	561.09.13.	2512	9343	Urban centre: Zrarda (4,303 inhabitants; 1,178 households)

=== Municipalities ===
Name	Geographic code	Households (2024)	Population (2024)
Aknoul	561.01.01.	1208	4410
Oued Amlil	561.01.05.	2544	10929
Tahla	561.01.07.	7619	28612
Taza	561.01.11.	40727	150763

== Tinghir Province ==
=== Rural communes ===
Name	Geographic code	Households (2024)	Population (2024)	Notes
Ait El Farsi	577.07.01.	1040	5653	
Ait Hani	577.03.01.	2183	11120	
Ait Ouassif	577.09.03.	1599	8885	
Ait Sedrate Jbel El Oulia	577.05.05.	904	4978	
Ait Sedrate Jbel El Soufla	577.05.07.	1099	5228	
Ait Sedrate Sahl Charkia	577.09.09.	2920	15506	
Ait Sedrate Sahl El Gharbia	577.09.11.	3988	19985	
Ait Youl	577.05.13.	842	4680	
Alnif	577.02.05.	3578	20978	Urban centre: Alnif (5,457 inhabitants; 1,011 households)
H'Ssyia	577.02.11.	1860	11713	
Ighil N'Oumgoun	577.09.15.	3734	23218	
Ikniouen	577.05.17.	2539	17707	
Imider	577.07.19.	763	4296	
M'Semrir	577.05.21.	1487	8686	
M'Ssici	577.02.21.	895	5455	
Ouaklim	577.07.23.	1976	12050	
Souk Lakhmis Dades	577.09.25.	3408	16154	
Taghzoute N'Ait Atta	577.07.27.	3232	15654	
Tilmi	577.05.29.	2049	11691	
Toudgha El Oulia	577.07.31.	1244	5084	
Toudgha Essoufla	577.07.33.	2663	13890	
Assoul	577.03.05.	1611	6827	

=== Municipalities ===
Name	Geographic code	Households (2024)	Population (2024)
Boumalne Dades	577.01.03.	2769	12391
Kalaat M'Gouna	577.01.05.	3900	17737
Tinghir	577.01.11.	9840	44239

== Tiznit Province ==
=== Rural communes ===
Name	Geographic code	Households (2024)	Population (2024)
Afella Ighir	581.09.01.	855	2446
Ait Issafen	581.03.01.	813	2497
Ait Ouafqa	581.09.03.	1135	3376
Ammelne	581.09.05.	1088	2782
Anzi	581.03.03.	1793	6199
Arbaa Ait Ahmed	581.03.05.	1210	3918
Arbaa Rasmouka	581.11.01.	1378	4620
Arbaa Sahel	581.11.03.	2650	8820
Bounaamane	581.11.05.	2485	8932
El Maader El Kabir	581.11.07.	1797	6009
Ida Ou Gougmar	581.03.07.	1327	4250
Irigh N'Tahala	581.09.07.	518	1417
Ouijjane	581.11.09.	1180	4079
Reggada	581.11.11.	3458	12521
Sidi Ahmed Ou Moussa	581.03.09.	910	3339
Sidi Bouabdelli	581.11.13.	1290	4610
Tafraout El Mouloud	581.03.11.	710	2014
Tarsouat	581.09.09.	741	2001
Tassrirt	581.09.11.	464	1130
Tighmi	581.03.13.	1551	5492
Tizoughrane	581.03.15.	1231	3725
Tnine Aday	581.03.17.	539	1696
Tnine Aglou	581.11.15.	2979	9950

=== Municipalities ===
Name	Geographic code	Households (2024)	Population (2024)
Tafraout	581.01.05.	1849	6124
Tiznit	581.01.07.	23860	86595

== Tétouan Province ==
=== Rural communes ===
Name	Geographic code	Households (2024)	Population (2024)	Notes
Ain Lahsan	571.03.01.	1888	7450	
Al Hamra	571.05.01.	2399	11877	
Al Khrroub	571.03.03.	509	2099	
Al Oued	571.05.05.	2238	10875	
Azla	571.05.07.	5553	22985	
Bghaghza	571.03.05.	1386	6238	
Bni Harchen	571.03.07.	1511	6423	
Bni Idder	571.03.11.	983	4659	
Bni Leit	571.05.13.	1004	5004	
Bni Said	571.05.15.	2358	10465	
Dar Bni Karrich	571.05.17.	2493	10115	Urban centre: Dar Bni Karrich (4,113 inhabitants; 1,104 households)
Jbel Lahbib	571.03.09.	1109	4126	Urban centre: Karia (1,494 inhabitants; 395 households)
Mallalienne	571.03.15.	2691	10874	
Oulad Ali Mansour	571.05.19.	850	4683	
Saddina	571.03.17.	1802	7619	
Sahtryine	571.03.21.	1987	8733	
Souk Kdim	571.03.19.	1986	8699	
Zaitoune	571.05.23.	3192	13492	
Zaouiat Sidi Kacem	571.05.25.	2729	12851	
Zinat	571.05.27.	1726	8214	

=== Municipalities ===
Name	Geographic code	Households (2024)	Population (2024)
Oued Laou	571.01.07.	3153	11690
Tetouan	571.01.11.	113837	422757

== Youssoufia Province ==
=== Rural communes ===
Name	Geographic code	Households (2024)	Population (2024)	Notes
Atiamim	585.07.01.	1486	6774	
El Gantour	585.07.03.	4192	17270	Urban centre: Sidi Ahmed (6,180 inhabitants; 1,554 households)
Esbiaat	585.07.05.	3124	14662	
Ighoud	585.05.07.	4669	22080	Urban centre: Ighoud (2,180 inhabitants; 519 households)
Jdour	585.05.09.	3897	19390	
Jnane Bouih	585.05.11.	4163	19755	
Lakhoualqa	585.07.13.	3142	14621	
Ras El Ain	585.07.15.	3752	19089	
Sidi Chiker	585.05.17.	4192	20291	

=== Municipalities ===
Name	Geographic code	Households (2024)	Population (2024)
Echemmaia	585.01.07.	6023	26547
Youssoufia	585.01.13.	16415	65669

== Zagora Province ==
=== Rural communes ===
Name	Geographic code	Households (2024)	Population (2024)
Afella N'Dra	587.03.01.	1149	6657
Afra	587.03.03.	1369	7554
Ait Boudaoud	587.11.05.	779	4757
Ait Ouallal	587.11.07.	1827	11751
Bleida	587.07.09.	616	4309
Bni Zoli	587.07.11.	2150	16241
Bouzeroual	587.07.13.	1385	9972
Errouha	587.07.15.	1432	9521
Fezouata	587.09.17.	1047	8001
Ktaoua	587.09.19.	1204	6157
Mezguita	587.03.21.	1135	7084
M'Hamid El Ghizlane	587.09.23.	1234	6664
N'Kob	587.11.25.	1477	7742
Oulad Yahia Lagraire	587.03.27.	1791	10686
Taftechna	587.07.29.	714	4661
Taghbalte	587.11.31.	1328	9176
Tagounite	587.09.33.	2603	15122
Tamegroute	587.09.35.	2771	19207
Tamezmoute	587.03.37.	1787	10953
Tansifte	587.03.39.	2040	11389
Tazarine	587.11.41.	2254	13895
Ternata	587.07.43.	2266	15911
Tinzouline	587.07.45.	2109	14652

=== Municipalities ===
Name	Geographic code	Households (2024)	Population (2024)
Agdz	587.01.01.	2254	11189
Zagora	587.01.13.	7898	42294
