= Sidi Ghanem =

Sidi Ghanem may refer to:

- Sidi Ghanem, Chichaoua Province
- Sidi Ghanem, Rehamna Province
