= Adassil =

Coordinates: 31°06′N 8°29′W

- Rural commune and town
- Interactive map of Adassil
- Country: Morocco
- Region: Marrakesh-Safi
- Province: Chichaoua

Population (2004)
  - Total: 7,219
- Time zone: UTC+0 (GMT)

Adassil is a town and rural commune in Chichaoua Province of the Marrakesh-Safi region of Morocco. At the time of the 2004 census, the commune had a population of 7,219 living in 1,323 households.

== Earthquake ==
In the 2023 Morocco earthquake, Adassil was largely destroyed.
