= Ait Haddou Youssef =

- Rural commune and town
- Location within Morocco Location within Africa
- Coordinates: 30°56′15″N 8°43′26″W
- Country: Morocco
- Region: Marrakech-Tensift-Al Haouz
- Province: Chichaoua Province

Population (2004)
  - Total: 5,557
- Time zone: UTC+0 (GMT)

Ait Haddou Youssef is a town and rural commune in Chichaoua Province of the Marrakech-Tensift-Al Haouz region of Morocco. At the time of the 2004 census, the commune had a total population of 5557 people living in 786 households.
