= Majjat =

- Rural commune and town
- Interactive map of Majjat
- Country: Morocco
- Region: Marrakech-Tensift-Al Haouz
- Province: Chichaoua Province

Population (2004)
  - Total: 11,798
- Time zone: UTC+0 (GMT)

Majjat is a town and rural commune in Chichaoua Province of the Marrakech-Tensift-Al Haouz region of Morocco . At the time of the 2004 census, the commune had a total population of 11,798 people living in 1,988 households.
