= Zaouia Annahlia =

- Rural commune and town
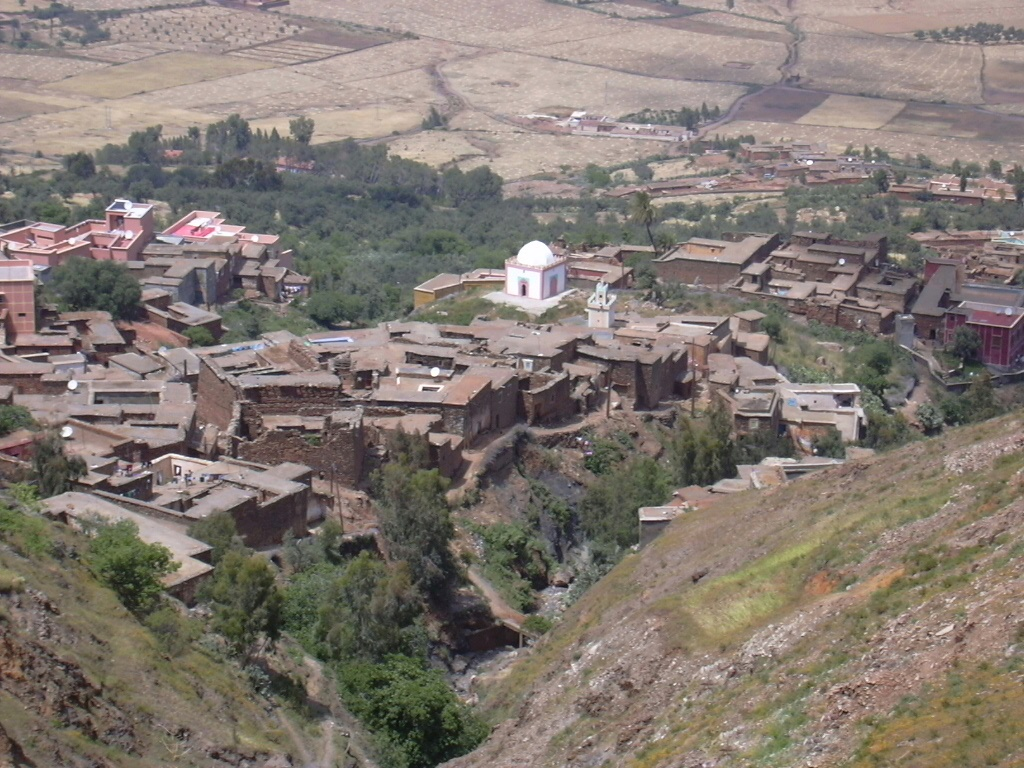

- Location within Morocco
- Coordinates: 31.22011°N 8.64786°W
- Country: Morocco
- Region: Marrakech-Tensift-Al Haouz
- Province: Chichaoua Province

Population (2004)
  - Total: 15,950
- Time zone: UTC+0 (GMT)

Zaouia Annahlia is a town and rural commune in Chichaoua Province of the Marrakech-Tensift-Al Haouz region of Morocco. At the time of the 2004 census, the commune had a total population of 15,950 people living in 2,604 households. According to later censuses, the population was 15,950 in 2004, 10,757 in 2014, and 11,722 in 2024.
