= Sidi Bouzid Arragragui =

Sidi Bouzid Arragragui سيدي بوزيد الركراكي
- Rural commune and town
- Interactive map of Sidi Bouzid Arragragui
- Country: Morocco
- Region: Marrakech-Tensift-Al Haouz
- Province: Chichaoua Province

Population (2004)
  - Total: 9,378
- Time zone: UTC+0 (GMT)

Sidi Bouzid Arragragui is a town and rural commune in Chichaoua Province of the Marrakech-Tensift-Al Haouz region of Morocco. At the time of the 2004 census, the commune had a total population of 9378 people living in 1751 households.
