= Douirane =

- Rural commune and town
- Location within Morocco
- Coordinates: 31.22458°N 8.72499°W
- Country: Morocco
- Region: Marrakesh-Safi
- Province: Chichaoua

Population (2004)
  - Total: 14,191
- Time zone: UTC+0 (GMT)

Douirane is a town and rural commune in Chichaoua Province of the Marrakesh-Safi region of Morocco. At the time of the 2004 census, the commune had a total population of 14,191 people living in 2551 households.
