= Tazarine =

- Location in Morocco
- Coordinates: 33°52′19.6″N 4°11′9.36″W
- Country: Morocco
- Region: Taza-Al Hoceima-Taounate
- Province: Taza

Population (2004)
  - Total: 2,623
- Time zone: UTC+0 (GMT)

Tazarine is a commune in the Taza Province of the Taza-Al Hoceima-Taounate administrative region of Morocco. According to the 2004 census, the commune had a total population of 2,623 people living in 467 households.
