= Assif El Mal =

Assif El Mal أسيف المال
- Rural commune and town
- Location within Morocco
- Coordinates: 31.26527°N 8.45861°W
- Country: Morocco
- Region: Marrakech-Tensift-Al Haouz
- Province: Chichaoua Province

Population (2004)
  - Total: 6,739
- Time zone: UTC+0 (GMT)

Assif El Mal is a town and rural commune in Chichaoua Province of the Marrakech-Tensift-Al Haouz region of Morocco. At the time of the 2004 census, the commune had a total population of 6739 people living in 1321 households.
