= Timezgadiouine =

Coordinates: 30°53′N 9°03′W

- Rural commune and town
- Interactive map of Timezgadiouine
- Country: Morocco
- Region: Marrakech-Tensift-Al Haouz
- Province: Chichaoua Province

Population (2004)
  - Total: 8,673
- Time zone: UTC+0 (GMT)

Timezgadiouine is a town and rural commune in Chichaoua Province of the Marrakech-Tensift-Al Haouz region of Morocco. At the time of the 2004 census, the commune had a total population of 8673 people living in 1613 households.
