= Lamzoudia =

Coordinates: 31°35′N 8°29′W

- Rural commune and town
- Interactive map of Lamzoudia
- Country: Morocco
- Region: Marrakesh-Safi
- Province: Chichaoua

Population (2004)
  - Total: 22,454
- Time zone: UTC+0 (GMT)

Lamzoudia is a town and rural commune in Chichaoua Province of the Marrakesh-Safi region of Morocco. At the time of the 2004 census, the commune had a total population of 22,454 people living in 3400 households.
