= Ichamraren =

- Rural commune and town
- Location within Morocco
- Coordinates: 31.12821°N 9.12858°W
- Country: Morocco
- Region: Marrakech-Tensift-Al Haouz
- Province: Chichaoua Province

Population (2004)
  - Total: 7,402
- Time zone: UTC+0 (GMT)

Ichamraren is a town and rural commune in the Chichaoua Province of the Marrakech-Safi region of Morocco. At the time of the 2004 census, the commune had a total population of 7,402 people living in 1,286 households.
