= Taouloukoult =

Coordinates: 31°13′N 9°05′W

- Rural commune and town
- Interactive map of Taouloukoult
- Country: Morocco
- Region: Marrakech-Tensift-Al Haouz
- Province: Chichaoua Province

Population (2004)
  - Total: 10,668
- Time zone: UTC+0 (GMT)

Taouloukoult is a town and rural commune in Chichaoua Province of the Marrakech-Tensift-Al Haouz region of Morocco. At the time of the 2004 census, the commune had a total population of 10668 people living in 1999 households.
