= Sid L'Mokhtar =

Coordinates: 31°34′12″N 9°00′36″W

Sid L'Mokhtar Sidi EL Mokhtar, Larb3a Sidi Mokhtar
- Town
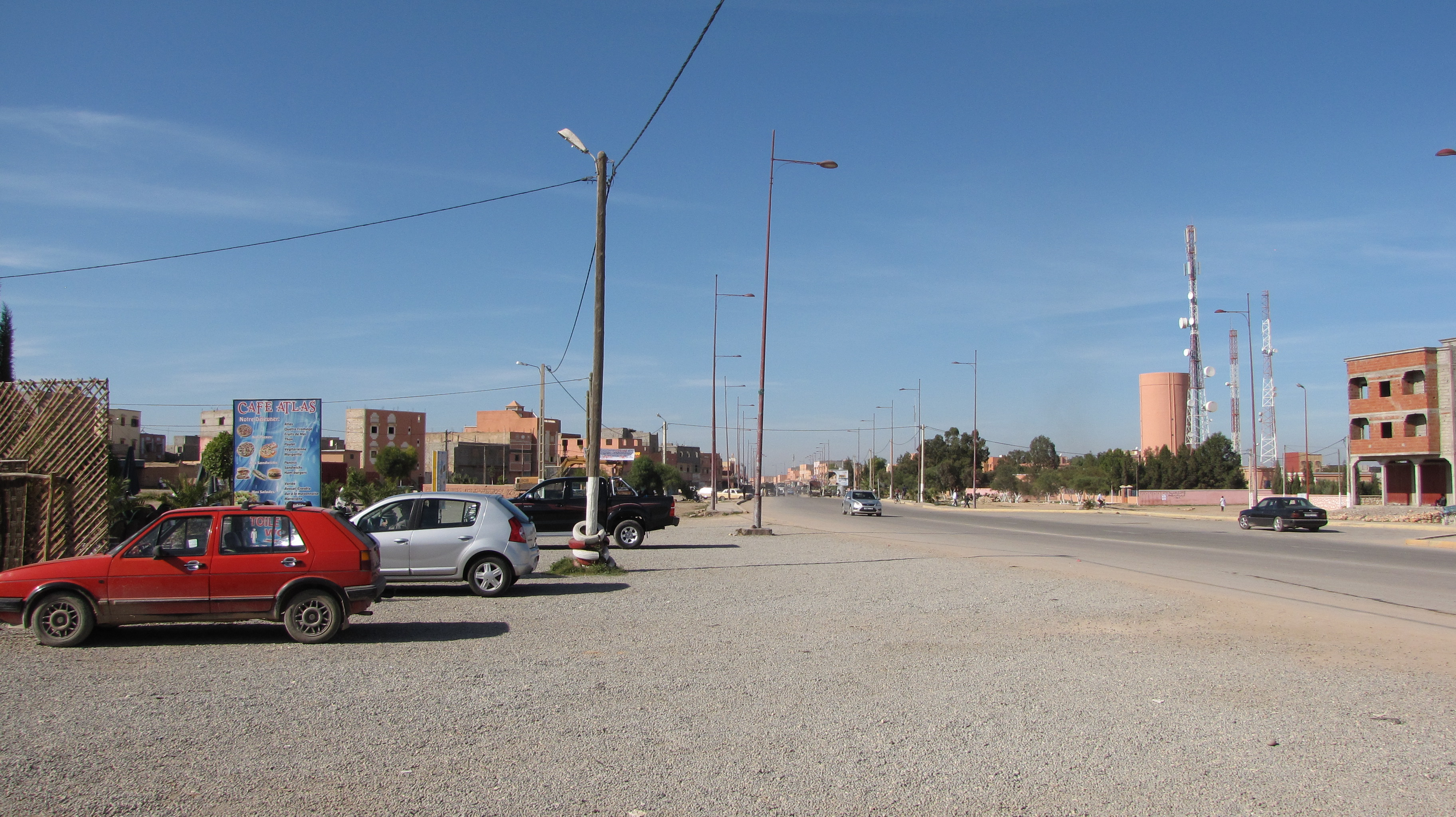
- A view in Sid L'Mokhtar.
- Interactive map of Sid L'Mokhtar
- Country: Morocco
- Region: Marrakesh-Safi
- Province: Chichaoua Province

Population (2004)
  - Total: 19,188
- Time zone: UTC+0 (GMT)

Sid L'Mokhtar or Sidi EL Mokhtar is a town located 100 km from Marrakesh and 75 km from Essaouira, it is a rural commune in Chichaoua Province of the Marrakesh-Safi region of Morocco. At the time of the 2004 census, the commune had a total population of 19188 people living in 3669 households. Sidi Mokhtar is also known as the home town of Ouled Bou Sbaa Tribe.
