= Irohalen =

- Rural commune and town
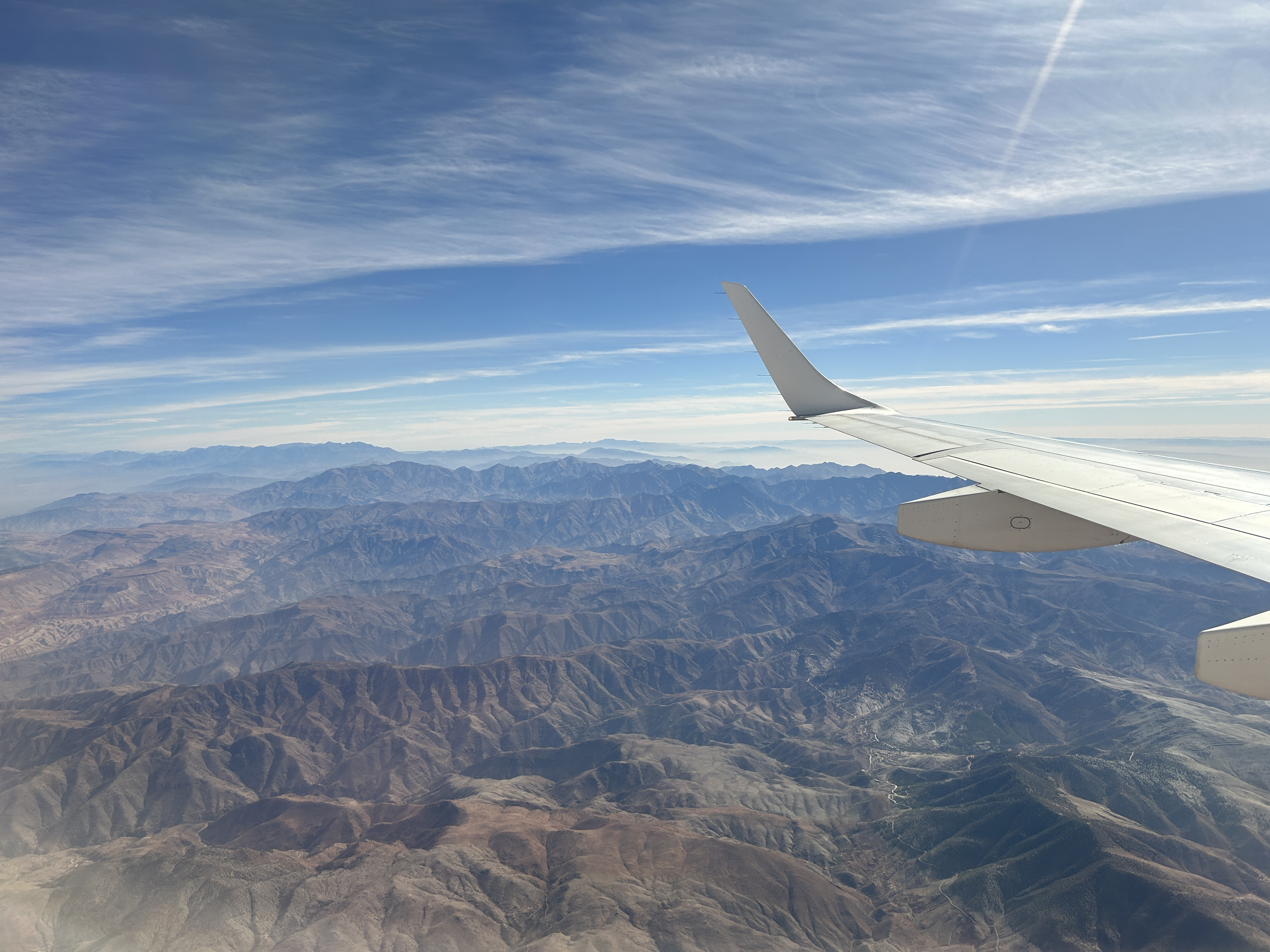
- Interactive map of Irohalen
- Country: Morocco
- Region: Marrakech-Tensift-Al Haouz
- Province: Chichaoua Province

Population (2004)
  - Total: 6,037
- Time zone: UTC+0 (GMT)

Irohalen is a town and rural commune in Chichaoua Province of the Marrakech-Tensift-Al Haouz region of Morocco. At the time of the 2004 census, the commune had a total population of 6037 people living in 1085 households.
