= Rahhala =

- Rural commune and town
- Location within Morocco
- Coordinates: 31.3356°N 9.1172°W
- Country: Morocco
- Region: Marrakech-Tensift-Al Haouz
- Province: Chichaoua Province

Population (2004)
  - Total: 6,357
- Time zone: UTC+0 (GMT)

Rahhala is a town and rural commune in Chichaoua Province of the Marrakech-Tensift-Al Haouz region of Morocco. At the time of the 2004 census, the commune had a total population of 6357 people living in 1173 households.
