= Oued L'Bour =

Oued L'Bour واد البور
- Rural commune and town
- Interactive map of Oued L'Bour
- Country: Morocco
- Region: Marrakech-Tensift-Al Haouz
- Province: Chichaoua Province

Population (2004)
  - Total: 6,864
- Time zone: UTC+0 (GMT)

Oued L'Bour is a town and rural commune in Chichaoua Province of the Marrakech-Tensift-Al Haouz region of Morocco. At the time of the 2004 census, the commune had a total population of 6864 people living in 1364 households.
