= Afalla Issen =

- Rural commune and town
- Location within Morocco
- Coordinates: 30°59′27″N 8°58′38″W
- Country: Morocco
- Region: Marrakesh-Safi
- Province: Chichaoua

Population (2014)
  - Total: 8,129
- Time zone: UTC+0 (GMT)

Afalla Issen is a town and rural commune in Chichaoua Province of the Marrakech-Safi region of Morocco. At the time of the 2004 census, the commune had a total population of 6961 people living in 1523 households.
