= Nfifa =

Nfifa نفيفة
- Rural commune and town
- Location within Morocco
- Coordinates: 31.26°N 8.89°W
- Country: Morocco
- Region: Marrakesh-Safi
- Province: Chichaoua

Population (2004)
  - Total: 5,455
- Time zone: UTC+0 (GMT)

Nfifa is a town and rural commune in Chichaoua Province of the Marrakesh-Safi region of Morocco. At the time of the 2004 census, the commune had a total population of 5,455 living in 1,056 households.
