= Imindounit =

- Rural commune and town
- Interactive map of Imindounit
- Coordinates: 31.03706°N 8.52536°W
- Country: Morocco
- Region: Marrakech-Tensift-Al Haouz
- Province: Chichaoua Province

Population (2004)
  - Total: 9,873
- Time zone: UTC+0 (GMT)

Imindounit is a town and rural commune in Chichaoua Province of the Marrakech-Safi region of Morocco. It belongs to the Ait Achahrar family. At the time of the 2004 census, the commune had a total population of 9873 people living in 1621 households.
