= Lalla Aaziza =

- Rural commune and town
- Location within Morocco
- Coordinates: 31°04′53″N 8°42′02″W
- Country: Morocco
- Region: Marrakesh-Safi
- Province: Chichaoua

Population (2004)
  - Total: 7,781
- Time zone: UTC+0 (GMT)

Lalla Aaziza is a town and rural commune in Chichaoua Province of the Marrakesh-Safi region of Morocco. At the time of the 2004 census, the commune had a total population of 7781 people living in 1355 households.
