= M'Zouda =

- Rural commune and town
- Interactive map of M'Zouda
- Coordinates: 31°34′48″N 8°29′35″W
- Country: Morocco
- Region: Marrakech-Tensift-Al Haouz
- Province: Chichaoua Province

Population (2004)
  - Total: 15,166
- Time zone: UTC+0 (GMT)

M'Zouda is a town and rural commune in Chichaoua Province of the Marrakech-Tensift-Al Haouz region of Morocco. At the time of the 2004 census, the commune had a total population of 15166 people living in 2671 households.
