= Bouabout =

- Rural commune and town
- Location within Morocco
- Coordinates: 31°16′N 9°11′W
- Country: Morocco
- Region: Marrakech-Tensift-Al Haouz
- Province: Chichaoua Province

Population (2004)
  - Total: 12,196
- Time zone: UTC+0 (GMT)

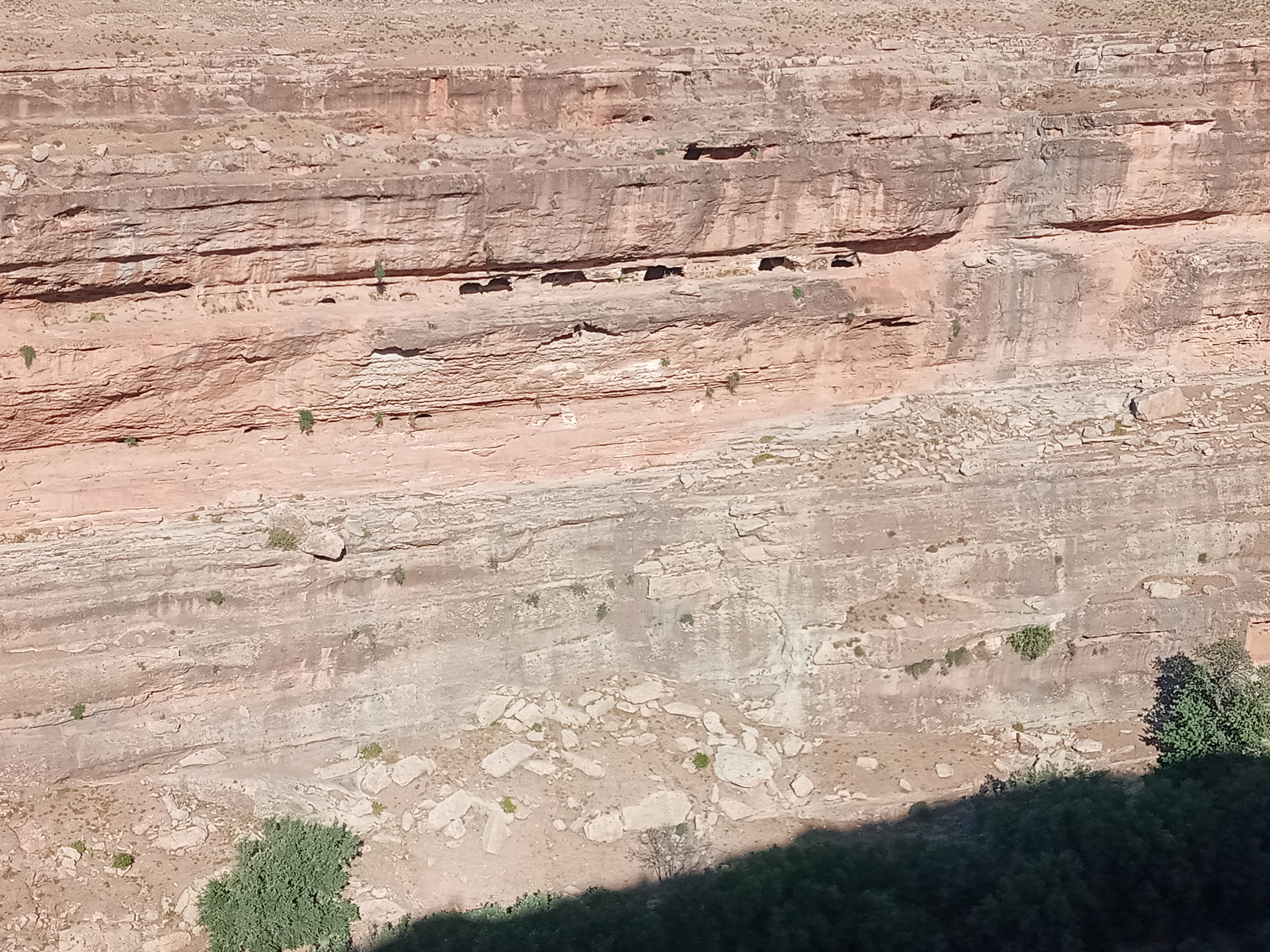

Bouabout is a town and rural commune in Chichaoua Province of the Marrakech-Tensift-Al Haouz region of Morocco. At the time of the 2004 census, the commune had a total population of 12196 people living in 2245 households.
