= Ahdil =

Rural commune and town in Morocco

Coordinates: 31°33′42″N 8°53′40″W

- Rural commune and town
- Interactive map of Ahdil
- Country: Morocco
- Region: Marrakech-Tensift-Al Haouz
- Province: Chichaoua Province

Population (2004)
  - Total: 11,764
- Time zone: UTC+0 (GMT)

Ahdil is a town and rural commune in Chichaoua Province of the Marrakech-Tensift-Al Haouz region of Morocco. At the time of the 2004 census, the commune had a total population of 11,764 living in 1,667 households.
