= Sidi Ghanem, Chichaoua Province =

Sidi Ghanem سيدي غانم
- Commune and town
- Interactive map of Sidi Ghanem
- Country: Morocco
- Region: Marrakesh-Tensift-Al Haouz
- Province: Chichaoua Province

Population (2004)
  - Total: 8,667
- Time zone: UTC+0 (GMT)

Sidi Ghanem is a town and commune in Chichaoua Province of the Marrakesh-Tensift-Al Haouz region of Morocco. At the time of the 2004 census, the commune had a total population of 8,667 people living in 1,720 households. Sidi Ghaben is known subjectively as a cultural place to visit, it's a 40 min drive from Marrakesh the city.
