= Chichaoua =

Coordinates: 31°32′N 8°46′W

Chichaoua شيشاوة ⵛⵉⵛⴰⵡⴰ
- City
- Interactive map of Chichaoua
- Country: Morocco
- Region: Marrakesh-Safi
- Province: Chichaoua Province

Population (2024)
  - Total: 38,452
- Time zone: UTC+0 (GMT)

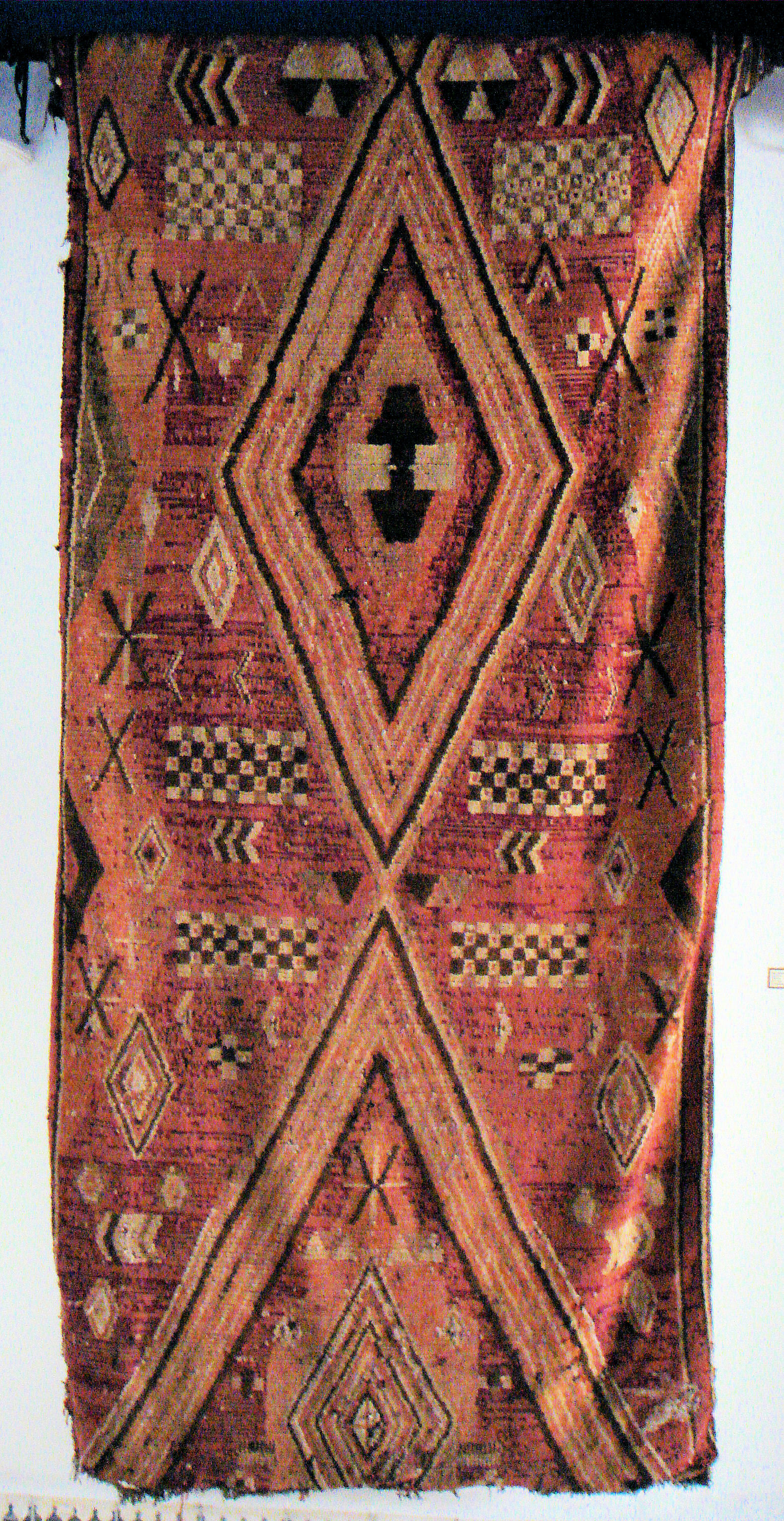
Chichaoua traditional carpet. Mohammed ben Abdallah museum.

Chichaoua (Arabic: شيشاوة, romanized: Shīshāwa; Standard Moroccan Tamazight: ⵛⵉⵛⴰⵡⴰ) is the capital and namesake for Chichaoua Province, Marrakesh-Safi, Morocco. According to the 2024 census it has a population of 38,452.
