= Chichaoua Province =

Chichaoua Province إقليم شيشاوة ⵜⴰⵙⴳⴰ ⵏ ⵛⵉⵛⴰⵡⴰ
- Province
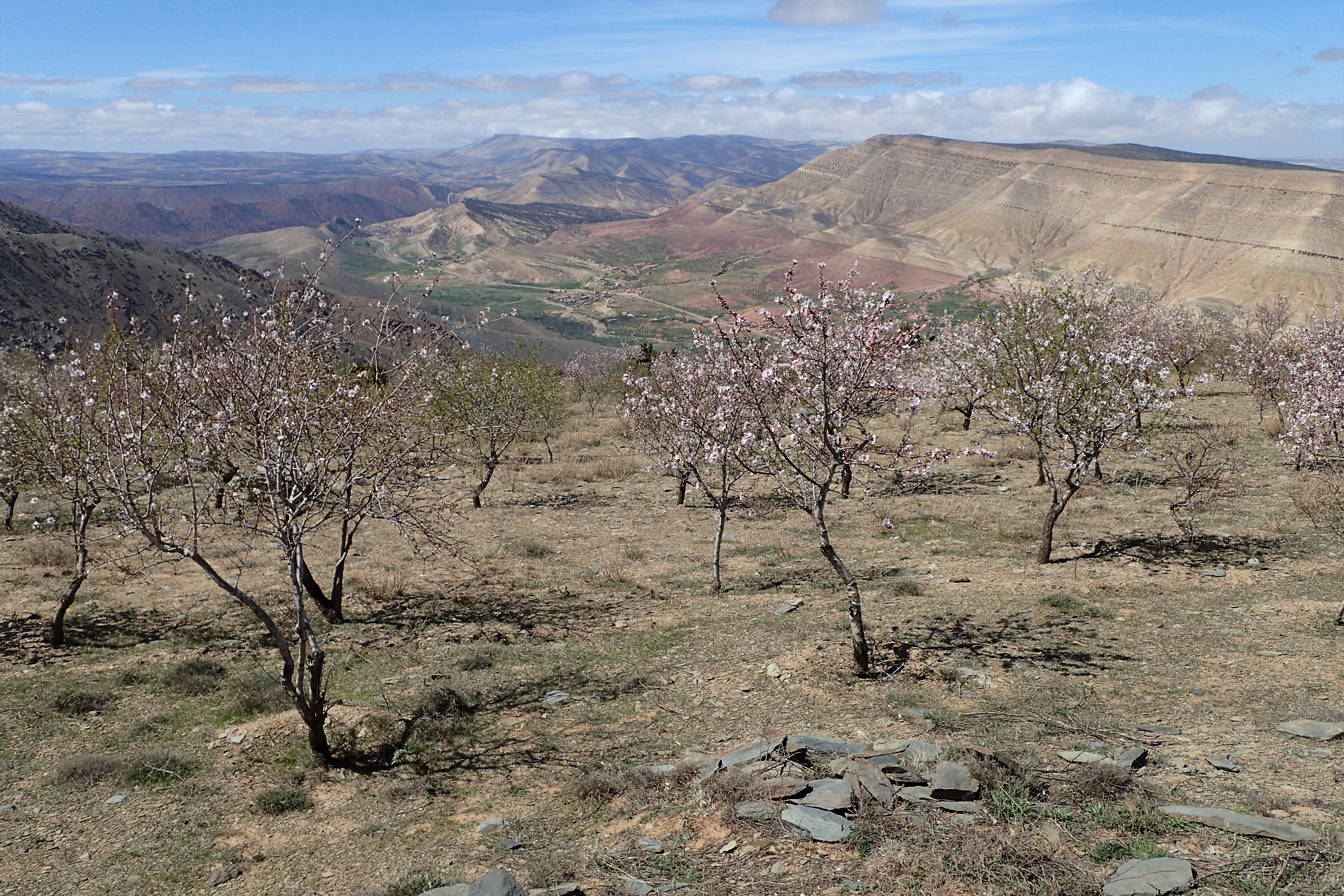
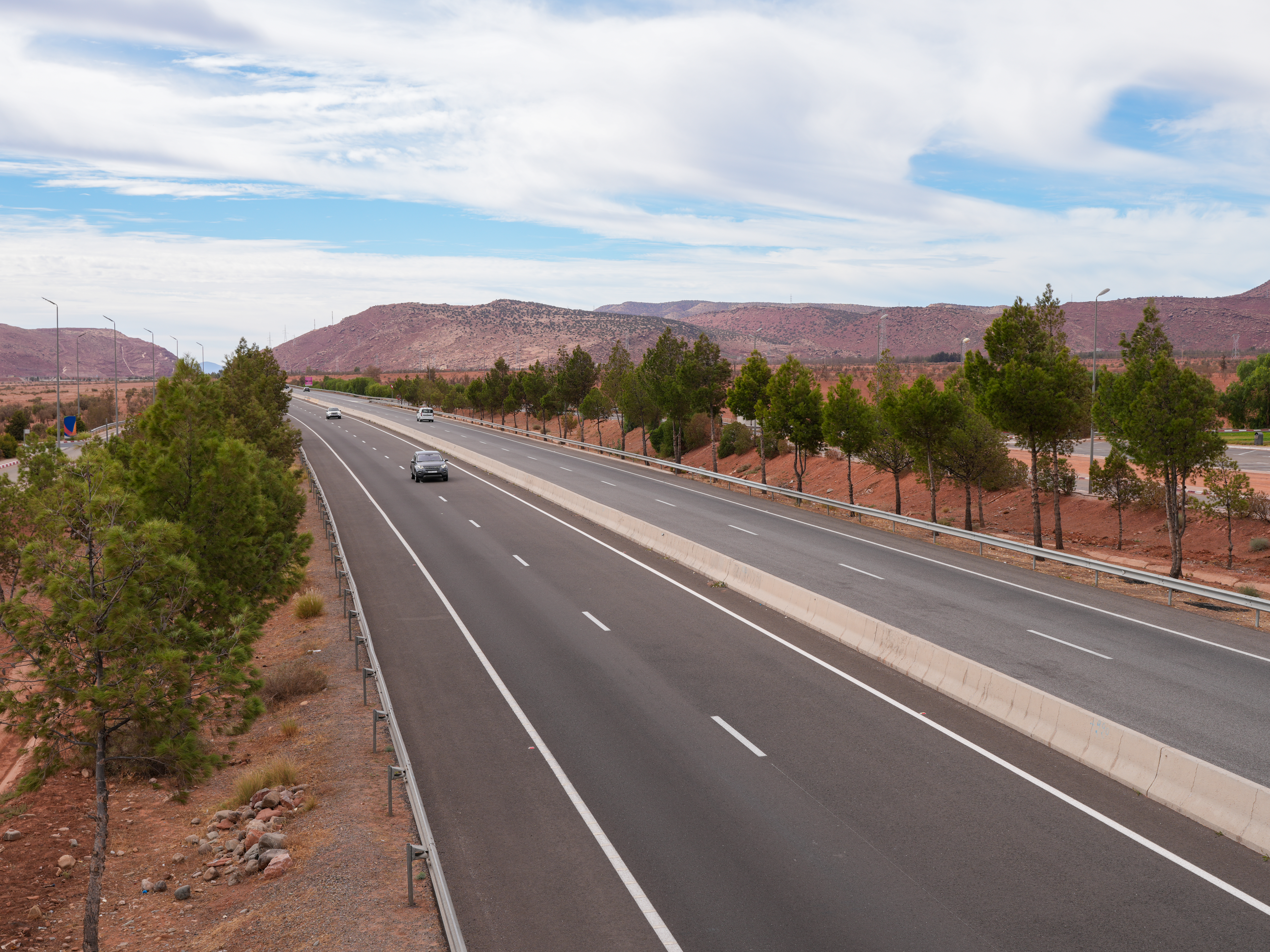
- Interactive map of Chichaoua Province
- Coordinates: 31°32′N 8°46′W
- Country: Morocco
- Region: Marrakesh-Safi
- Capital: Chichaoua

Government
  - Governor: Abdullatif Berrada Al Azizi

Population (2024)
  - Total: 379,079
- Time zone: UTC+0 (GMT)

Chichaoua (Arabic: إقليم شيشاوة: Standard Moroccan Tamazight: ⵜⴰⵙⴳⴰ ⵏ ⵛⵉⵛⴰⵡⴰ) is a predominantly rural province in the Moroccan region of Marrakesh-Safi. Its population in 2024 was 379,079.

The major cities and towns are:

- Chichaoua
- Imintanut
- Sid L Mukhtar

== Earthquake ==
In September 2023, the 2023 Al Haouz earthquake took place. This was the biggest earthquake in fifty plus years.

== Subdivisions ==
Communes of Chichaoua Province

The province is divided administratively into the following:

=== Rural communes ===
Name	Geographic code	Households (2024)	Population (2024)	Notes
Adassil	161.07.01.	1702	7078	
Afalla Issen	161.05.01.	1928	7221	
Ahdil	161.03.01.	2290	11130	
Ain Tazitounte	161.05.03.	1166	4651	
Ait Haddou Youssef	161.05.05.	1022	5174	
Ait Hadi	161.03.03.	2189	8847	
Assif El Mal	161.07.03.	2024	8002	
Bouabout	161.09.01.	2510	9825	
Bouabout Amdlane	161.09.03.	1633	6405	
Douirane	161.07.05.	3993	17256	
Gmassa	161.07.07.	2660	10675	
Ichamraren	161.09.05.	1537	5707	
Imindounit	161.07.09.	2337	10890	
Irohalen	161.05.07.	1261	5031	
Kouzemt	161.09.07.	927	3371	
Lalla Aaziza	161.05.09.	1656	7534	
Lamzoudia	161.03.05.	5960	27004	
Majjat	161.07.11.	3557	14708	
M'Zouda	161.07.13.	6177	25342	
Nfifa	161.05.11.	1643	6282	
Oued L'Bour	161.05.13.	1352	4918	
Oulad Moumna	161.03.07.	1708	7092	
Rahhala	161.09.09.	1344	4859	
Saidate	161.03.09.	1602	6354	
Sidi Abdelmoumen	161.09.11.	2063	7055	
Sidi Bouzid Arragragui	161.03.13.	2152	8622	
Sidi Ghanem	161.05.15.	2073	8397	
Sidi M'Hamed Dalil	161.03.15.	1338	5619	
Sid L'Mokhtar	161.03.11.	6764	27083	Urban centre: Sid L'mokhtar (20,860 inhabitants; 5,251 households)
Taouloukoult	161.09.13.	2436	9362	
Timezgadiouine	161.05.17.	1770	6780	
Timlilt	161.09.15.	1504	5582	
Zaouia Annahlia	161.07.15.	2490	11722	

=== Municipalities ===
Name	Geographic code	Households (2024)	Population (2024)
Chichaoua	161.01.01.	9127	38452
Imintanoute	161.01.03.	6367	25049
