= Faid =

Faid may refer to:

== People ==
- Íriel Fáid, Irish king
- Mary Alice Faid or Mary Faid (1897–1990), Scottish novelist
- Robert W. Faid (1929–2008), American author
- Rédoine Faïd (born 1972), French criminal

== Places ==
- El Faid, Morocco
- Faid, Rhineland-Palatinate, Germany
- Faïd, Tunisia
