= Ahmar Laglalcha =

- Rural commune and town
- Location within Morocco
- Coordinates: 30.517515°N 8.899575°W
- Country: Morocco
- Region: Souss-Massa-Drâa
- Province: Taroudant Province

Population (2004)
  - Total: 13,854
- Time zone: UTC+0 (GMT)

Ahmar Laglalcha is a small town and rural commune in Taroudant Province of the Souss-Massa-Drâa region of Morocco. At the time of the 2004 census, the commune had a total population of 13,854 people living in 2,504 households.
