= Sidi Dahmane =

Sidi Dahmane سيدي دحمان
- Rural commune and town
- Location within Morocco
- Country: Morocco
- Region: Souss-Massa-Drâa
- Province: Taroudant Province

Population (2004)
  - Total: 8,414
- Time zone: UTC+0 (GMT)

Sidi Dahmane is a small town and rural commune in Taroudant Province of the Souss-Massa-Drâa region of Morocco. At the time of the 2004 census, the commune had a population of 8,414 living in 1,560 households.
