= Ouzioua =

Ouzioua أوزيوة
- Rural commune and town
- Interactive map of Ouzioua
- Country: Morocco
- Region: Souss-Massa-Drâa
- Province: Taroudant Province

Population (2004)
  - Total: 7,467
- Time zone: UTC+0 (GMT)

Ouzioua is a small town and rural commune in Taroudant Province of the Souss-Massa-Drâa region of Morocco. At the time of the 2004 census, the commune had a total population of 7467 people living in 1194 households.
