= Tidsi Nissendalene =

- Rural commune and town
- Interactive map of Tidsi Nissendalene
- Country: Morocco
- Region: Souss-Massa-Drâa
- Province: Taroudant Province

Population (2004)
  - Total: 6,180
- Time zone: UTC+0 (GMT)

Tidsi Nissendalene is a small town and rural commune in Taroudant Province of the Souss-Massa-Drâa region of Morocco. At the time of the 2004 census, the commune had a total population of 6180 people living in 1054 households.
