= Imoulass =

- Rural commune and town
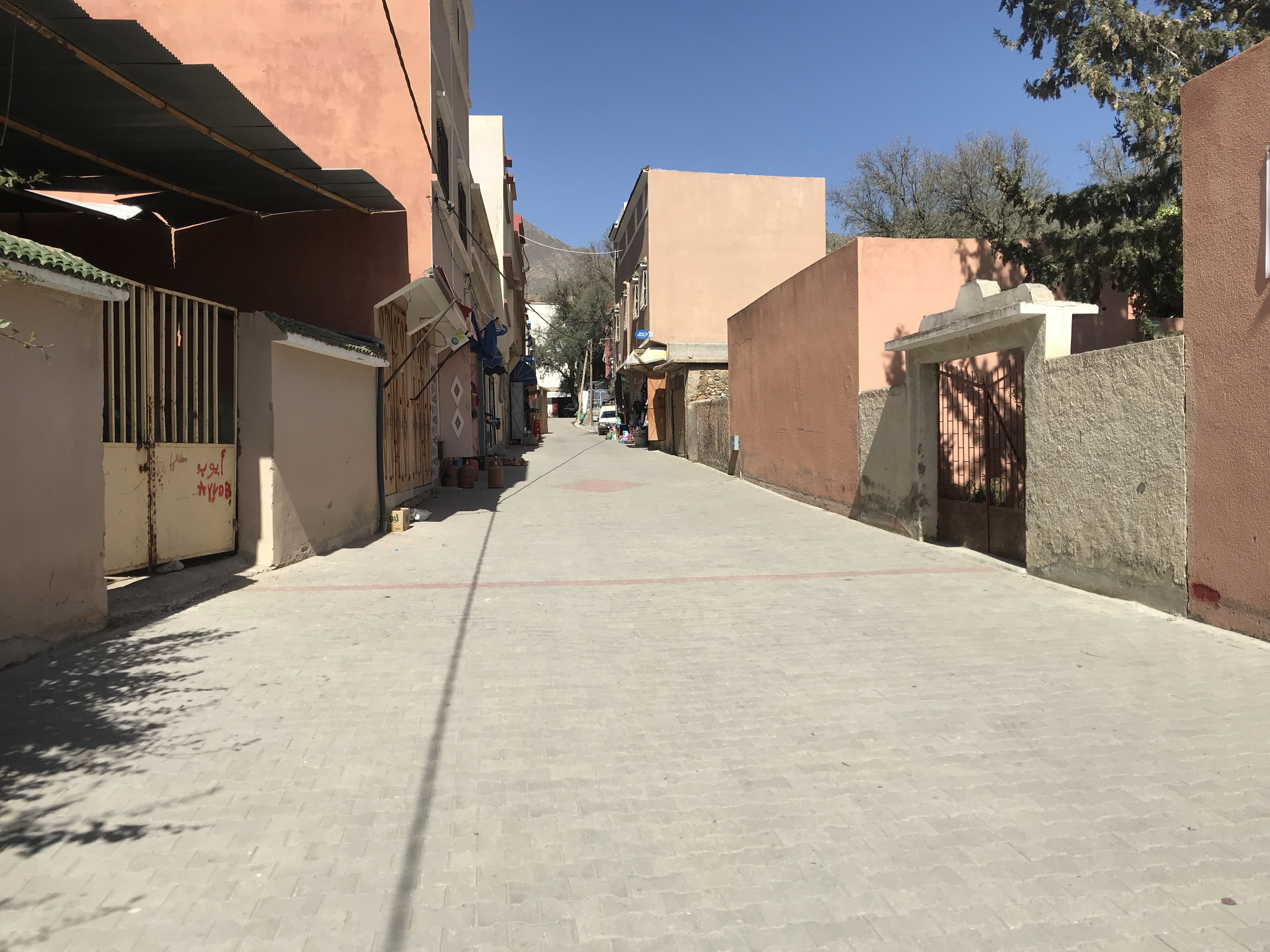
- Central Imoulass
- Interactive map of Imoulass
- Country: Morocco
- Region: Souss-Massa-Drâa
- Province: Taroudant Province

Population (2004)
  - Total: 9,320
- Time zone: UTC+0 (GMT)

Imoulass is a small town and rural commune in Taroudant Province of the Souss-Massa-Drâa region of Morocco. At the time of the 2004 census, the commune had a total population of 9320 people living in 1648 households.
