= Bounrar =

Coordinates: 30.338415°N 8.79587°W

- Rural commune and town
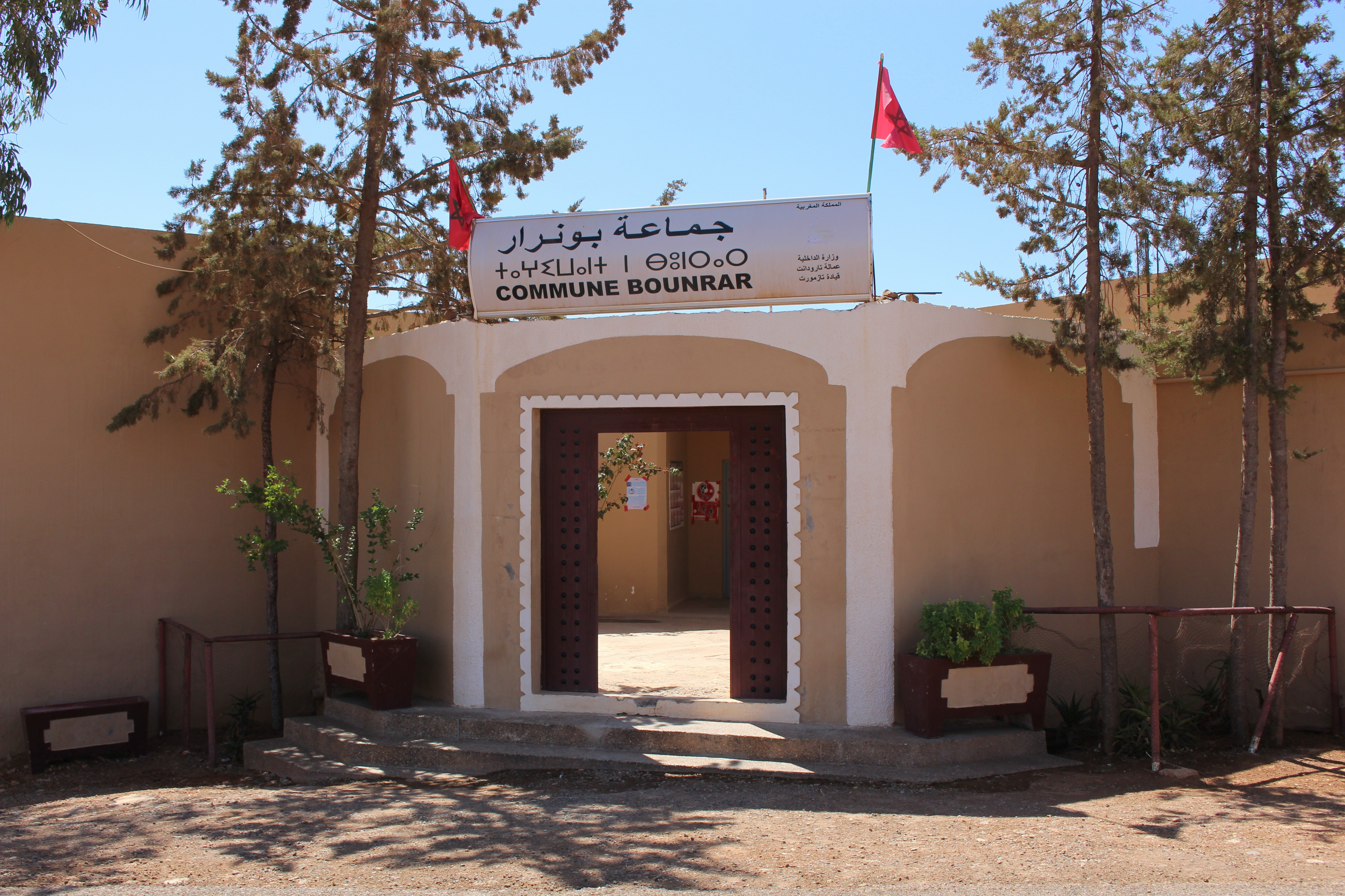
- Interactive map of Bounrar
- Country: Morocco
- Region: Souss-Massa-Drâa
- Province: Taroudant Province

Population (2004)
  - Total: 6,855
- Time zone: UTC+0 (GMT)

Bounrar is a small town and rural commune in Taroudant Province of the Souss-Massa-Drâa region of Morocco. At the time of the 2004 census, the commune had a total population of 6,855 people living in 1,154 households.
