= Sidi Mzal =

- Rural commune and town
- Interactive map of Sidi Mzal
- Country: Morocco
- Region: Souss-Massa-Drâa
- Province: Taroudant Province

Population (2024)
  - Total: 1,367
- Time zone: UTC+0 (GMT)

Sidi Mzal is a small town and rural commune in Taroudant Province of the Souss-Massa-Drâa region of Morocco. At the time of the 2004 census, the commune had a total population of 1367 people living in 631 households.
