= Ida Ou Moumen =

- Rural commune and town
- Interactive map of Ida Ou Moumen
- Coordinates: 30°35′44″N 9°00′21″W
- Country: Morocco
- Region: Souss-Massa-Drâa
- Province: Taroudant Province

Population (2004)
  - Total: 6,023
- Time zone: UTC+0 (GMT)

Ida Ou Moumen is a small town and rural commune in Taroudant Province of the Souss-Massa-Drâa region of Morocco. At the time of the 2004 census, the commune had a total population of 6023 people living in 961 households.
