= Sidi Moussa Lhamri =

- Rural commune and town
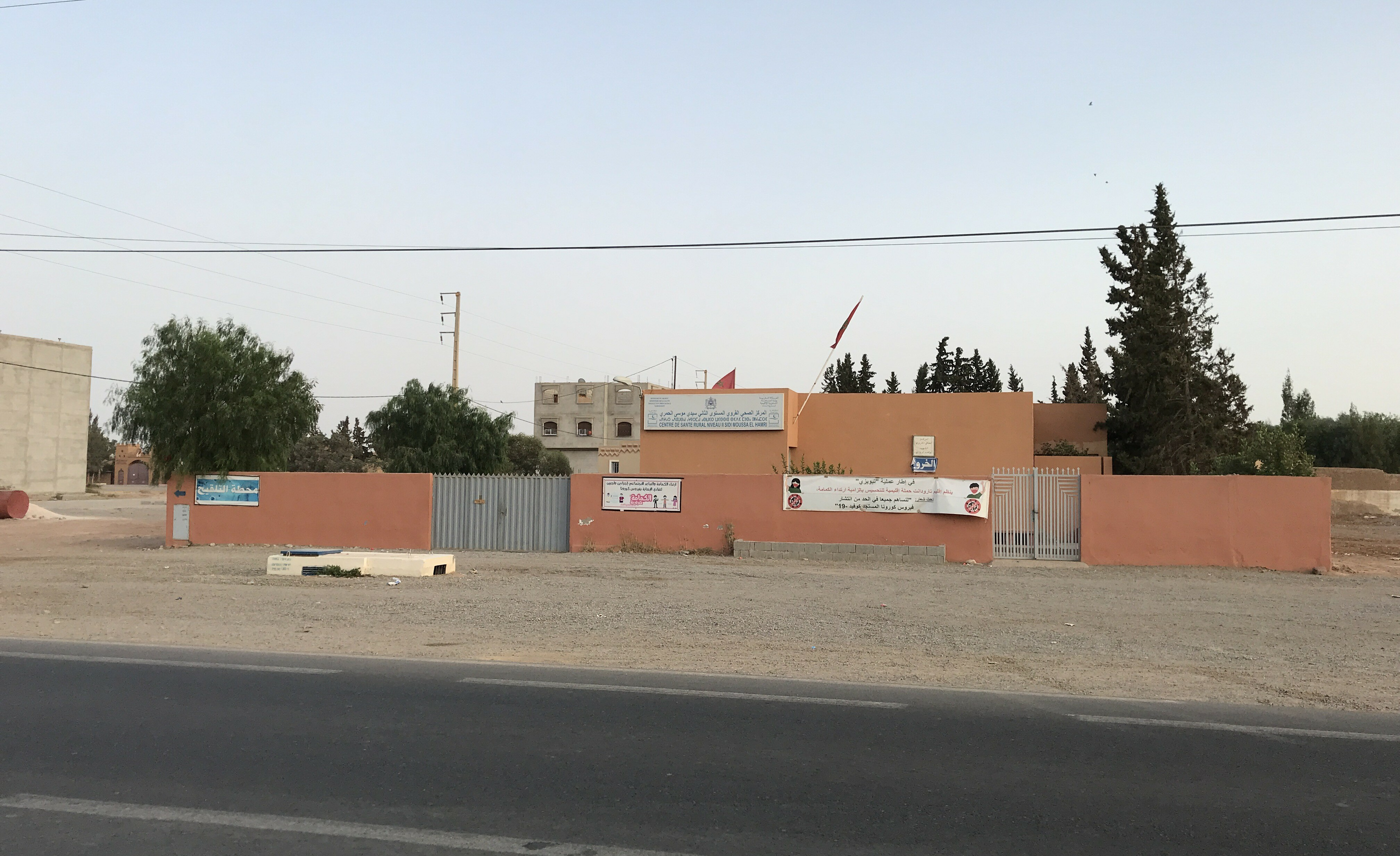
- Health center
- Interactive map of Sidi Moussa Lhamri
- Country: Morocco
- Region: Souss-Massa-Drâa
- Province: Taroudant Province

Population (2014)
  - Total: 14,972
- Time zone: UTC+0 (GMT)

Sidi Moussa Lhamri is a small town and rural commune in Taroudant Province of the Souss-Massa-Drâa region of Morocco. At the time of the 2004 census, the commune had a total population of 12,074 people living in 1826 households.
