= Imilmaiss =

Imilmaiss ⵉⵎⵉⵍⵎⴰⵢⵙ إميلمايس
- Rural commune and town
- Location within Morocco
- Coordinates: 30.904°N 8.834°W
- Country: Morocco
- Region: Souss-Massa-Drâa
- Province: Taroudant Province

Population (2004)
  - Total: 7,398
- Time zone: UTC+0 (GMT)

Imilmaiss is a small town and rural commune in Taroudant Province of the Souss-Massa-Drâa region of Morocco. At the time of the 2004 census, the commune had a total population of 7,398 people living in 1,188 households.
