= Talgjount =

- Rural commune and town
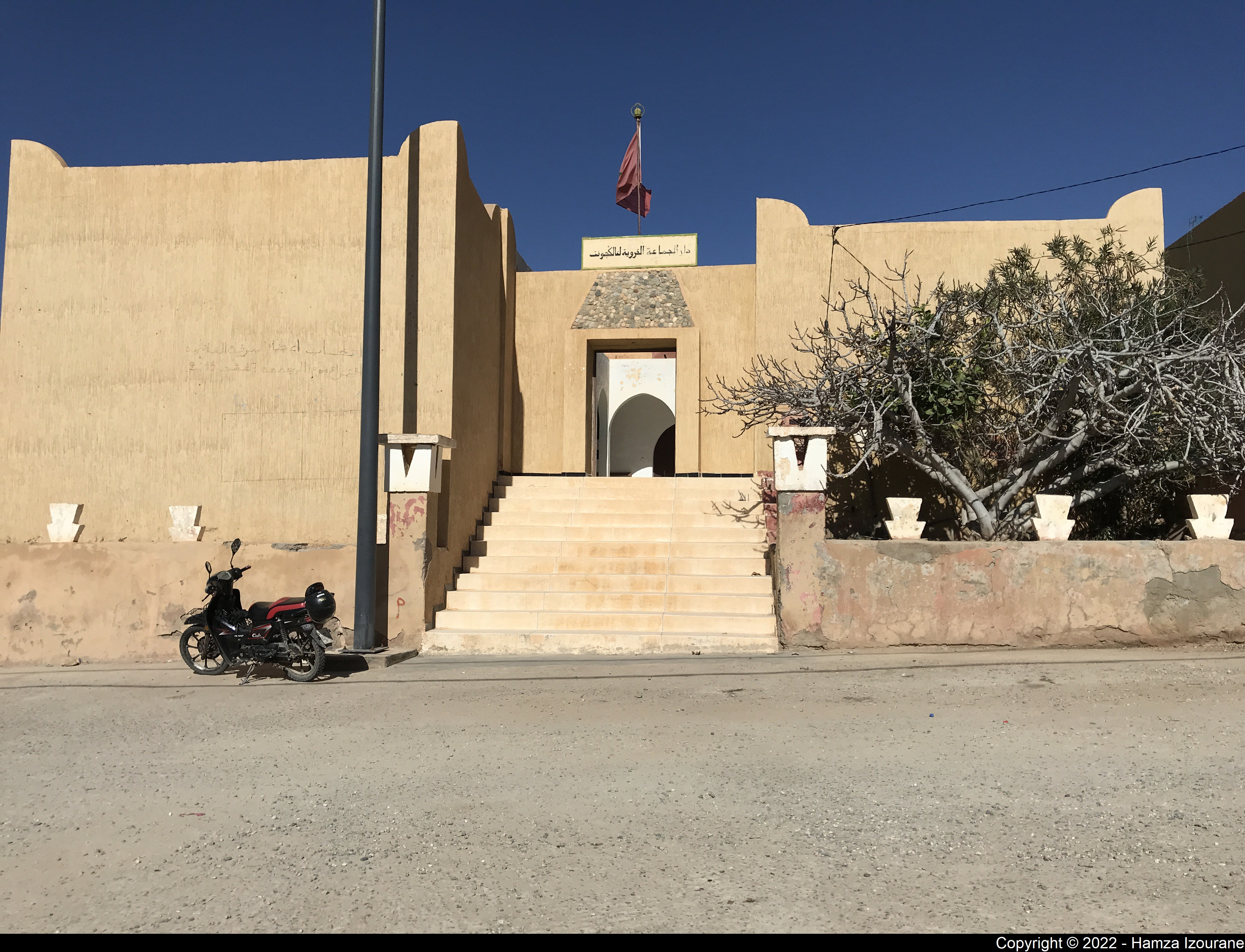

- Location within Morocco
- Coordinates: 30°43′50″N 8°32′45″W
- Country: Morocco
- Region: Souss-Massa-Drâa
- Province: Taroudant Province

Population (2004)
  - Total: 5,662
- Time zone: UTC+0 (GMT)

Talgjount is a small town and rural commune in Taroudant Province of the Souss-Massa-Drâa region of Morocco. At the time of the 2004 census, the commune had a total population of 5,662 people living in 911 households.
