= Zaouia Sidi Tahar =

Zaouia Sidi Tahar زاوية سيدي الطاهر
- Rural commune and town
- Location within Morocco
- Coordinates: 30.471119°N 9.119765°W
- Country: Morocco
- Region: Souss-Massa-Drâa
- Province: Taroudant Province

Population (2004)
  - Total: 9,511
- Time zone: UTC+0 (GMT)

Zaouia Sidi Tahar is a small town and rural commune in Taroudant Province of the Souss-Massa-Drâa region of Morocco. At the time of the 2004 census, the commune had a total population of 9,511 people living in 1,571 households.
