= Tataoute =

- Rural commune and town
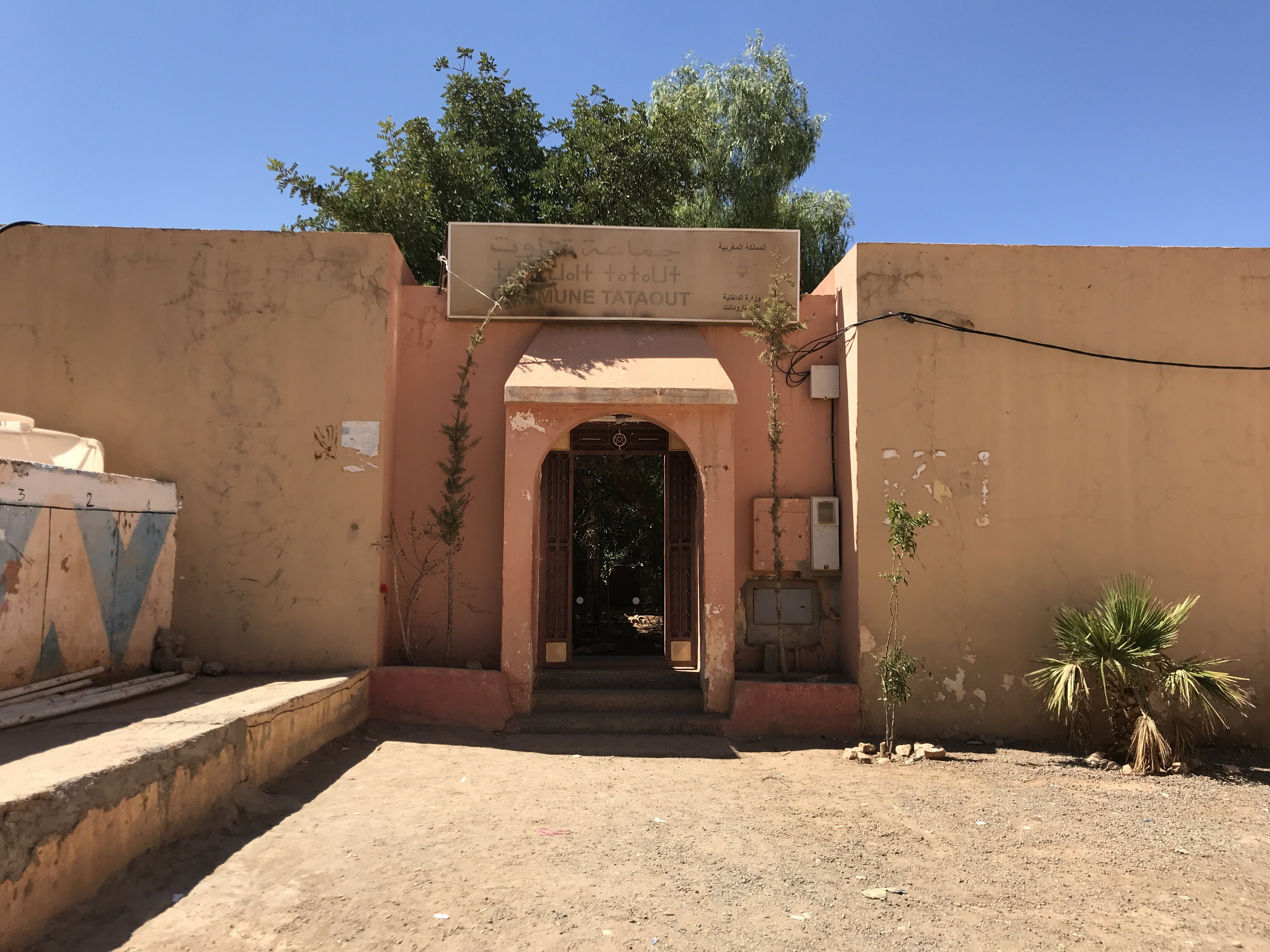
- Interactive map of Tataoute
- Country: Morocco
- Region: Souss-Massa-Drâa
- Province: Taroudant Province

Population (2004)
  - Total: 5,630
- Time zone: UTC+0 (GMT)

Tataoute is a small town and rural commune in Taroudant Province of the Souss-Massa-Drâa region of Morocco. At the time of the 2004 census, the commune had a total population of 5630 people living in 1109 households.
