= Sidi Ahmed Ou Amar =

- Rural commune and town
- Interactive map of Sidi Ahmed Ou Amar
- Coordinates: 30°25′11″N 9°09′52″W
- Country: Morocco
- Region: Souss-Massa-Drâa
- Province: Taroudant Province

Population (2004)
  - Total: 13,753
- Time zone: UTC+0 (GMT)

Sidi Ahmed Ou Amar is a small town and rural commune in Taroudant Province of the Souss-Massa-Drâa region of Morocco. At the time of the 2004 census, the commune had a total population of 13,753 people living in 2287 households.
