= Freija, Morocco =

Coordinates: 30°29′N 8°47′W

Freija
- Rural commune and town
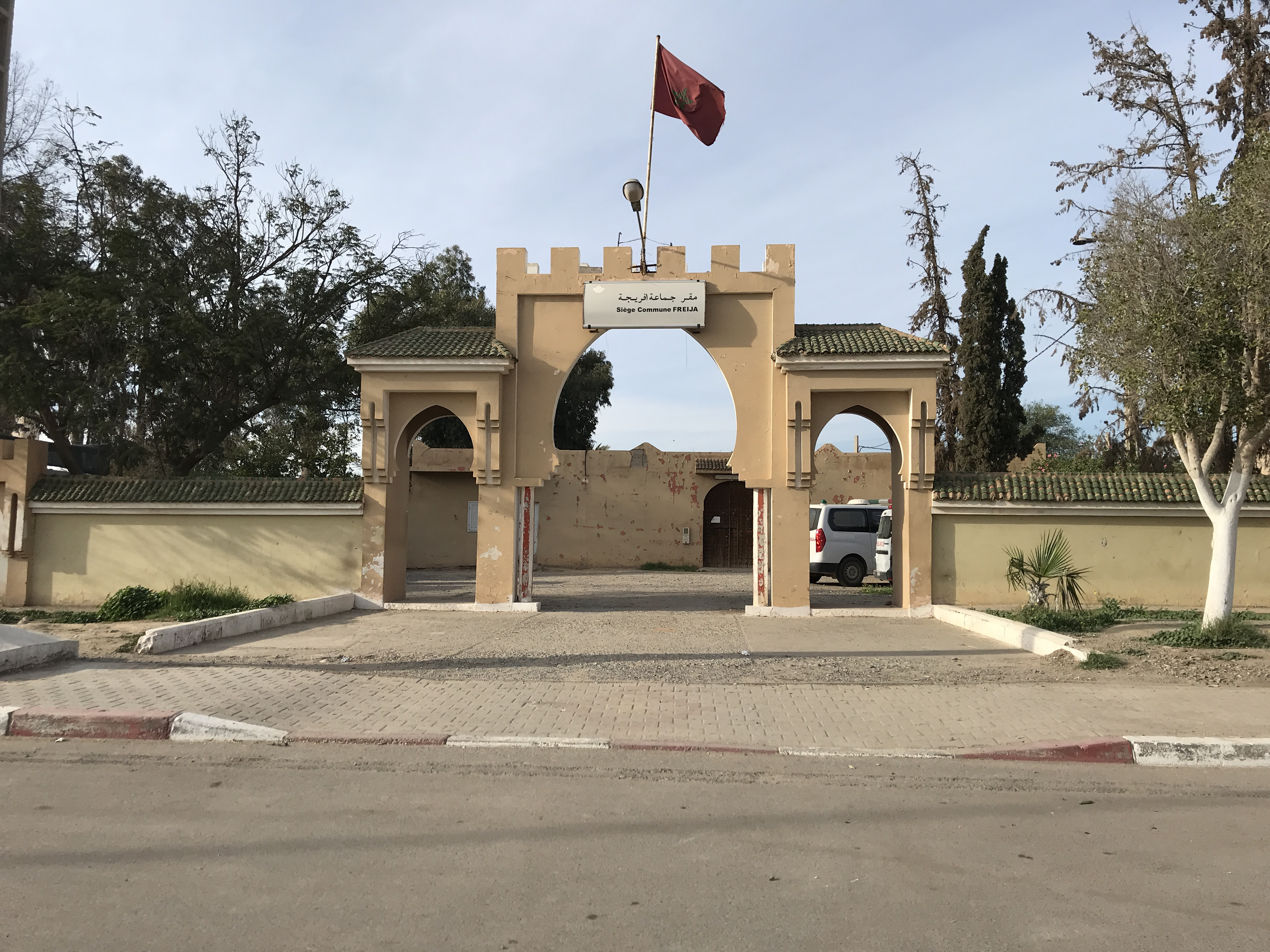

- Location within Morocco
- Country: Morocco
- Region: Souss-Massa
- Province: Taroudant

Population (2004)
  - Total: 7,685
- Time zone: UTC+0 (WET)
  - Summer (DST): UTC+1 (WEST)

Freija is a small town and rural commune in Taroudant Province of the Souss-Massa region of Morocco. At the time of the 2004 census, the commune had a total population of 7685 people living in 1200 households.

The best known story or rather true story is that around 1960-1980 a man named Abdelmalek Bahida settled in the village and there are still lands from him living there today Riad Freija is from the Familia Bahida and will be continued from generation to generation
