= Sidi Ahmed Ou Abdallah =

- Rural commune and town
- Interactive map of Sidi Ahmed Ou Abdallah
- Country: Morocco
- Region: Souss-Massa-Drâa
- Province: Taroudant Province

Population (2004)
  - Total: 4,543
- Time zone: UTC+0 (GMT)

Sidi Ahmed Ou Abdallah is a small town and rural commune in Taroudant Province of the Souss-Massa-Drâa region of Morocco. At the time of the 2004 census, the commune had a total population of 4543 people living in 822 households.
