= Ait Makhlouf =

Coordinates: 33°25′N 4°19′W

- Rural commune and town
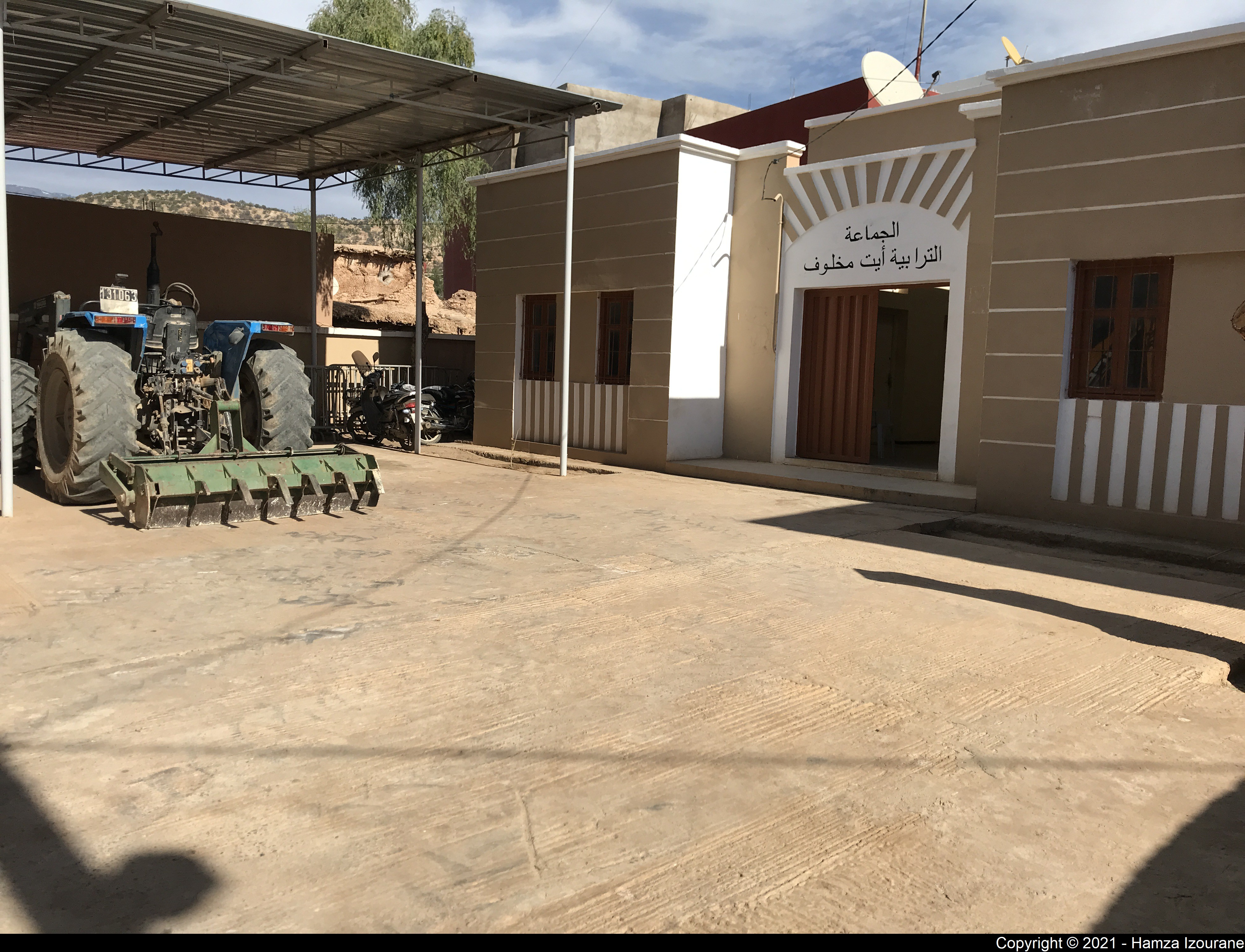
- headquarters of the rural commune of Ait Makhlouf
- Interactive map of Ait Makhlouf
- Country: Morocco
- Region: Souss-Massa-Drâa
- Province: Taroudant Province

Population (2004)
  - Total: 5,285
- Time zone: UTC+0 (GMT)

Ait Makhlouf is a small town and rural commune in Taroudant Province of the Souss-Massa-Drâa region of Morocco. At the time of the 2004 census, the commune had a total population of 5,285 people living in 1,001 households.
