= Igli =

Igli may refer to:

== Places ==
- Igli, Algeria, a town and commune
- Igli, Morocco, a small town and rural commune

== People ==
- Igli Allmuça (born 1980), Albanian footballer
- Igli Cara, Albanian politician
- Igli Tare (born 1973), Albanian former footballer
