= Agadir Melloul =

Coordinates: 30°13′N 7°48′W

- Rural commune and town
- Interactive map of Agadir Melloul
- Country: Morocco
- Region: Souss-Massa-Drâa
- Province: Taroudant Province

Population (2004)
  - Total: 8,756
- Time zone: UTC+0 (GMT)

Agadir Melloul is a small town and rural commune in Taroudant Province of the Souss-Massa-Drâa region of Morocco. At the time of the 2004 census, the commune had a total population of 8756 people living in 1307 households.
