= Assersif =

- Town
- Location within Morocco
- Coordinates: 29.5736°N 9.270°W
- Country: Morocco
- Region: Souss-Massa-Draa
- Elevation: 530 m (1,740 ft)
- Time zone: UTC+0 (GMT)

Assersif (Arabic: أسرسيف) is a town in the region of Souss-Massa-Drâa in southern Morocco, some 18 km (11.1 mi) south-west of Agadir, the region's capital and largest city.
