= Ahl Ramel =

Coordinates: 30.312296°N 9.106655°W

Ahl Ramel أهل الرمل
- Rural commune and town
- Interactive map of Ahl Ramel
- Country: Morocco
- Region: Souss-Massa-Drâa
- Province: Taroudant Province

Population (2004)
  - Total: 8,286
- Time zone: UTC+0 (GMT)

Ahl Ramel is a small town and rural commune in Taroudant Province of the Souss-Massa-Drâa region of Morocco. At the time of the 2004 census, the commune had a total population of 8,286 people living in 1,386 households.
