= Lamhadi =

Coordinates: 32°18′N 9°01′W

- Rural commune and town
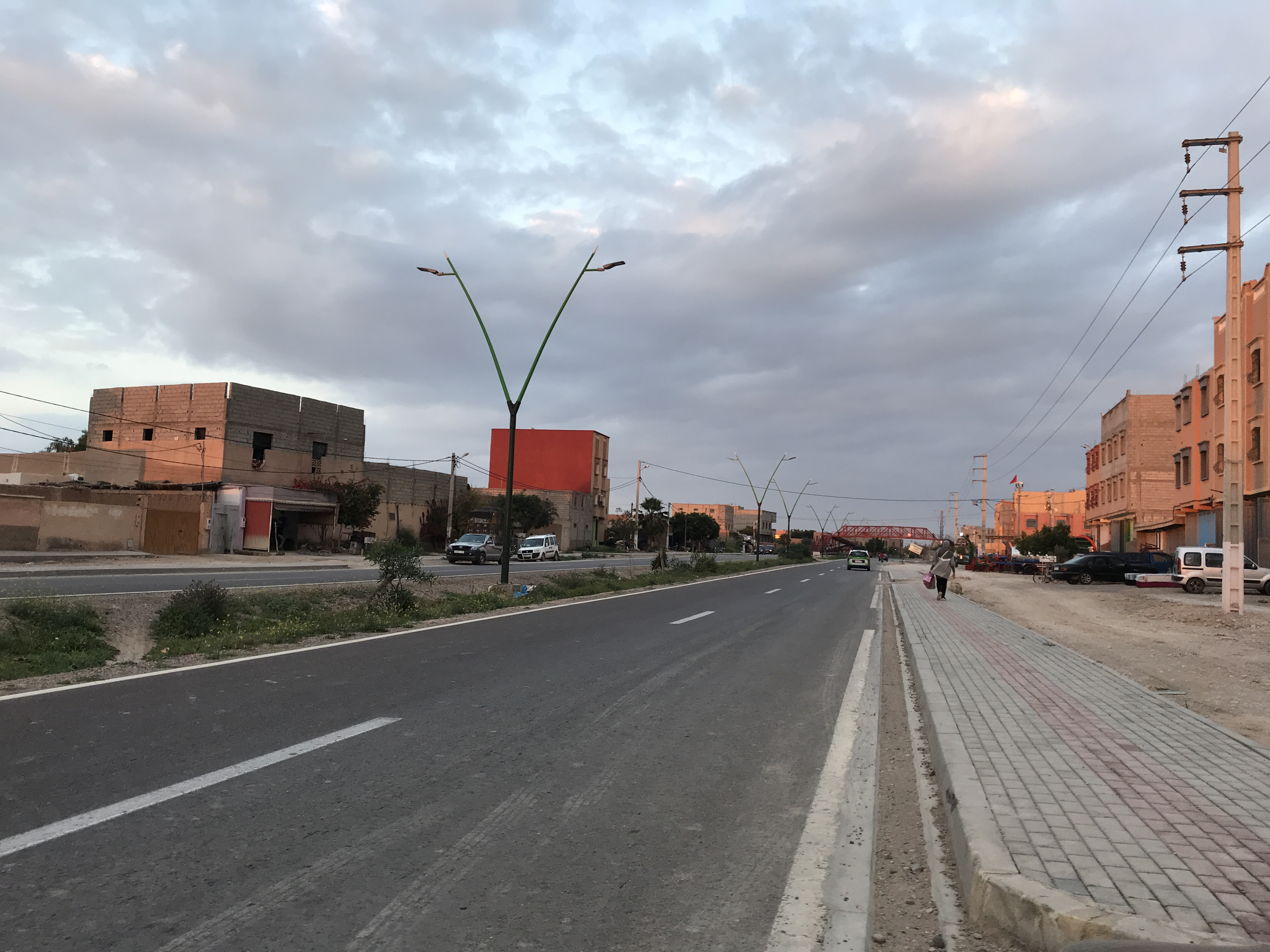
- Interactive map of Lamhadi
- Country: Morocco
- Region: Souss-Massa-Drâa
- Province: Taroudant Province

Population (2004)
  - Total: 10,651
- Time zone: UTC+0 (GMT)

Lamhadi is a small town and rural commune in Taroudant Province of the Souss-Massa-Drâa region of Morocco. At the time of the 2004 census, the commune had a total population of 10,651 people living in 1,632 households.
