= Imi N'Tayart =

- Rural commune and town
- Interactive map of Imi N'Tayart
- Country: Morocco
- Region: Souss-Massa-Drâa
- Province: Taroudant Province

Population (2004)
  - Total: 2,366
- Time zone: UTC+0 (GMT)

Imi N'Tayart is a small town and rural commune in Taroudant Province of the Souss-Massa-Drâa region of Morocco. At the time of the 2004 census, the commune had a total population of 2366 people living in 624 households.
