= Ida Ou Gailal =

Coordinates: 30°38′N 8°38′W

- Rural commune and town
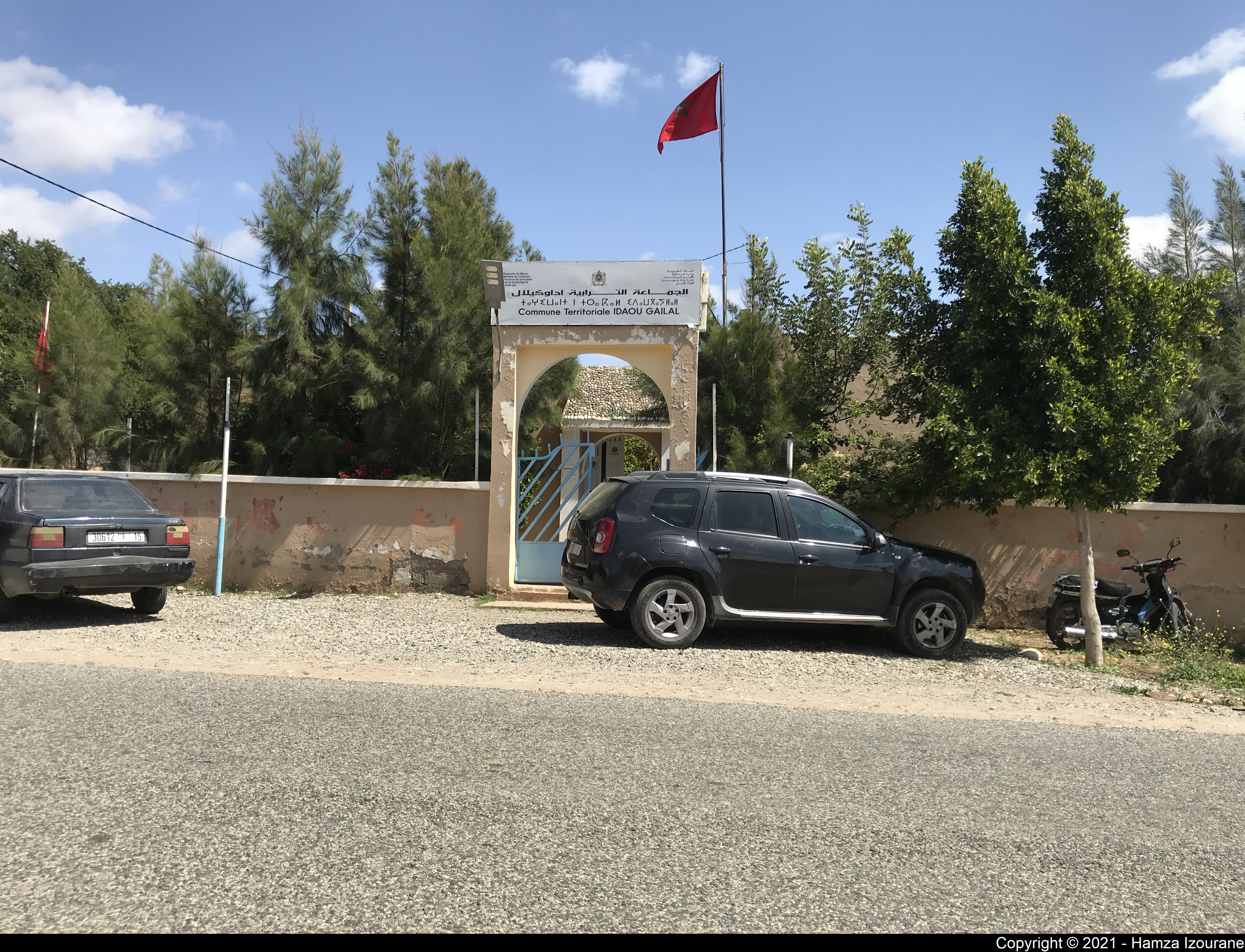
- Ida Ou Gailal
- Interactive map of Ida Ou Gailal
- Country: Morocco
- Region: Souss-Massa-Drâa
- Province: Taroudant Province

Population (2004)
  - Total: 6,431
- Time zone: UTC+0 (GMT)

Ida Ou Gailal is a small town and rural commune in Taroudant Province of the Souss-Massa-Drâa region of Morocco. At the time of the 2004 census, the commune had a total population of 6431 people living in 1057 households.
