= Lamnizla =

- Rural commune and village
- Location within Morocco
- Coordinates: 30.608000°N 9.074167°W
- Country: Morocco
- Region: Souss-Massa-Drâa
- Province: Taroudant Province

Population (2004)
  - Total: 4,994
- Time zone: UTC+0 (GMT)

Lamnizla (also El Had Mnzila or El-Menizla) is a village and rural commune in Taroudant Province of the Souss-Massa-Drâa region of Morocco. At the time of the 2004 census, the commune had a total population of 4,994 people living in 773 households. The village is situated in the foothills of the Atlas Mountains.
