= Tinzart =

Coordinates: 30°37′N 7°45′W

- Rural commune and town
- Interactive map of Tinzart
- Country: Morocco
- Region: Souss-Massa-Drâa
- Province: Taroudant Province

Population (2004)
  - Total: 5,513
- Time zone: UTC+0 (GMT)

Tinzart is a small town and rural commune in Taroudant Province of the Souss-Massa-Drâa region of Morocco. At the time of the 2004 census, the commune had a total population of 5513 people living in 963 households.
