= Azrar =

Coordinates: 30.170235°N 7.923435°W

- Rural commune and town
- Interactive map of Azrar
- Country: Morocco
- Region: Souss-Massa-Drâa
- Province: Taroudant Province

Population (2004)
  - Total: 5,045
- Time zone: UTC+0 (GMT)

Azrar is a small town and rural commune in Taroudant Province of the Souss-Massa-Drâa region of Morocco. At the time of the 2004 census, the commune had a total population of 5045 people living in 804 households.
