= Tizgzaouine =

Coordinates: 31°00′N 7°09′W

- Rural commune and town
- Interactive map of Tizgzaouine
- Country: Morocco
- Region: Souss-Massa-Drâa
- Province: Taroudant Province

Population (2004)
  - Total: 5,986
- Time zone: UTC+0 (GMT)

Tizgzaouine is a small town and rural commune in Taroudant Province of the Souss-Massa-Drâa region of Morocco. At the time of the 2004 census, the commune had a total population of 5,986 people living in 1,061 households.
