= Ouneine =

- Rural commune and town
- Location within Morocco
- Coordinates: 30°52′02″N 8°11′09″W
- Country: Morocco
- Region: Souss-Massa-Drâa
- Province: Taroudant Province

Population (2004)
  - Total: 8,417
- Time zone: UTC+0 (GMT)

Ouneine is a small town and rural commune in Taroudant Province of the Souss-Massa-Drâa region of Morocco. At the time of the 2004 census, the commune had a total population of 8,417 people living in 1,379 households.
