= Issen =

- Rural commune and town
- Interactive map of Issen
- Coordinates: 30°25′54″N 9°15′28″W
- Country: Morocco
- Region: Souss-Massa-Drâa
- Province: Taroudant Province

Population (2004)
  - Total: 10,624
- Time zone: UTC+0 (GMT)

Issen is a small town and rural commune in Taroudant Province of the Souss-Massa-Drâa region of Morocco.

== Population ==
At the time of the 2004 census, the commune had a total population of 10,624 people living in 1755 households.
