= Tafingoult =

Coordinates: 30°46′N 8°23′W

- Rural commune and town
- Interactive map of Tafingoult
- Country: Morocco
- Region: Souss-Massa-Drâa
- Province: Taroudant Province

Population (2004)
  - Total: 6,559
- Time zone: UTC+0 (GMT)

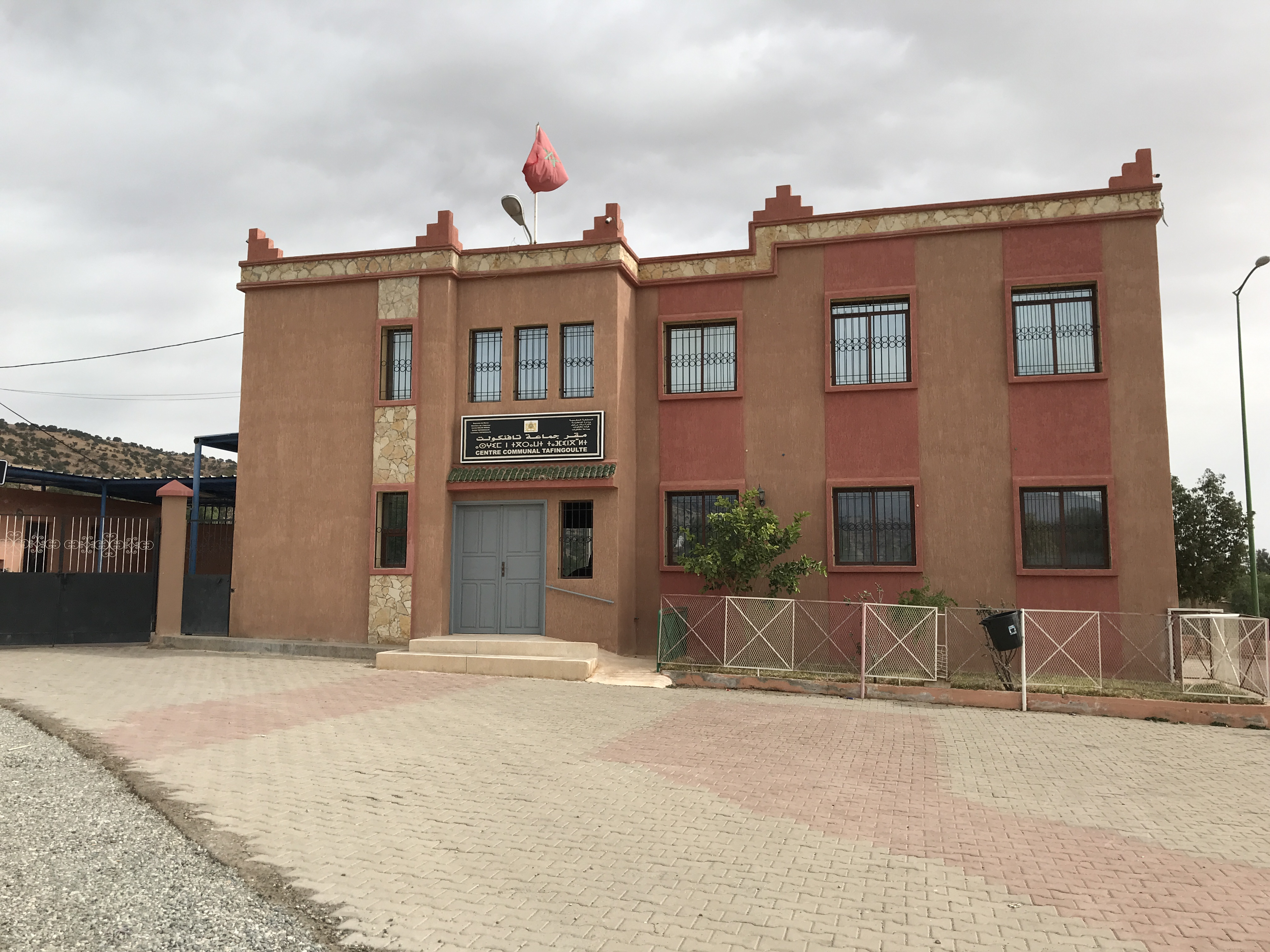
Tafenkoult Commune City hall - Taroudant Province

Tafingoult is a small town and rural commune in Taroudant Province of the Souss-Massa-Drâa region of Morocco. At the time of the 2004 census, the commune had a total population of 6559 people living in 1070 households.
