= Askaouen =

Coordinates: 30.768724°N 7.77292°W

- Rural commune and town
- Interactive map of Askaouen
- Country: Morocco
- Region: Souss-Massa-Drâa
- Province: Taroudant Province

Population (2004)
  - Total: 7,447
- Time zone: UTC+0 (GMT)

Askaouen is a small town and rural commune in Taroudant Province of the Souss-Massa-Drâa region of Morocco. At the time of the 2004 census, the commune had a total population of 7,447 people living in 1,166 households.
