= Sidi Boaal =

- Rural commune and town
- Interactive map of Sidi Boaal
- Country: Morocco
- Region: Souss-Massa-Drâa
- Province: Taroudant Province

Population (2004)
  - Total: 4,042
- Time zone: UTC+0 (GMT)

Sidi Boaal is a small town and rural commune in Taroudant Province of the Souss-Massa-Drâa region of Morocco. At the time of the 2004 census, the commune had a total population of 4042 people living in 855 households.
