= Tindine =

- Rural commune and town
- Interactive map of Tindine
- Country: Morocco
- Region: Souss-Massa-Drâa
- Province: Taroudant Province

Population (2004)
  - Total: 3,612
- Time zone: UTC+0 (GMT)

Tindine is a small town and rural commune in Taroudant Province of the Souss-Massa-Drâa region of Morocco. At the time of the 2004 census, the commune had a total population of 3,612 people living in 767 households.
