= Tazemmourt =

- Rural commune and town
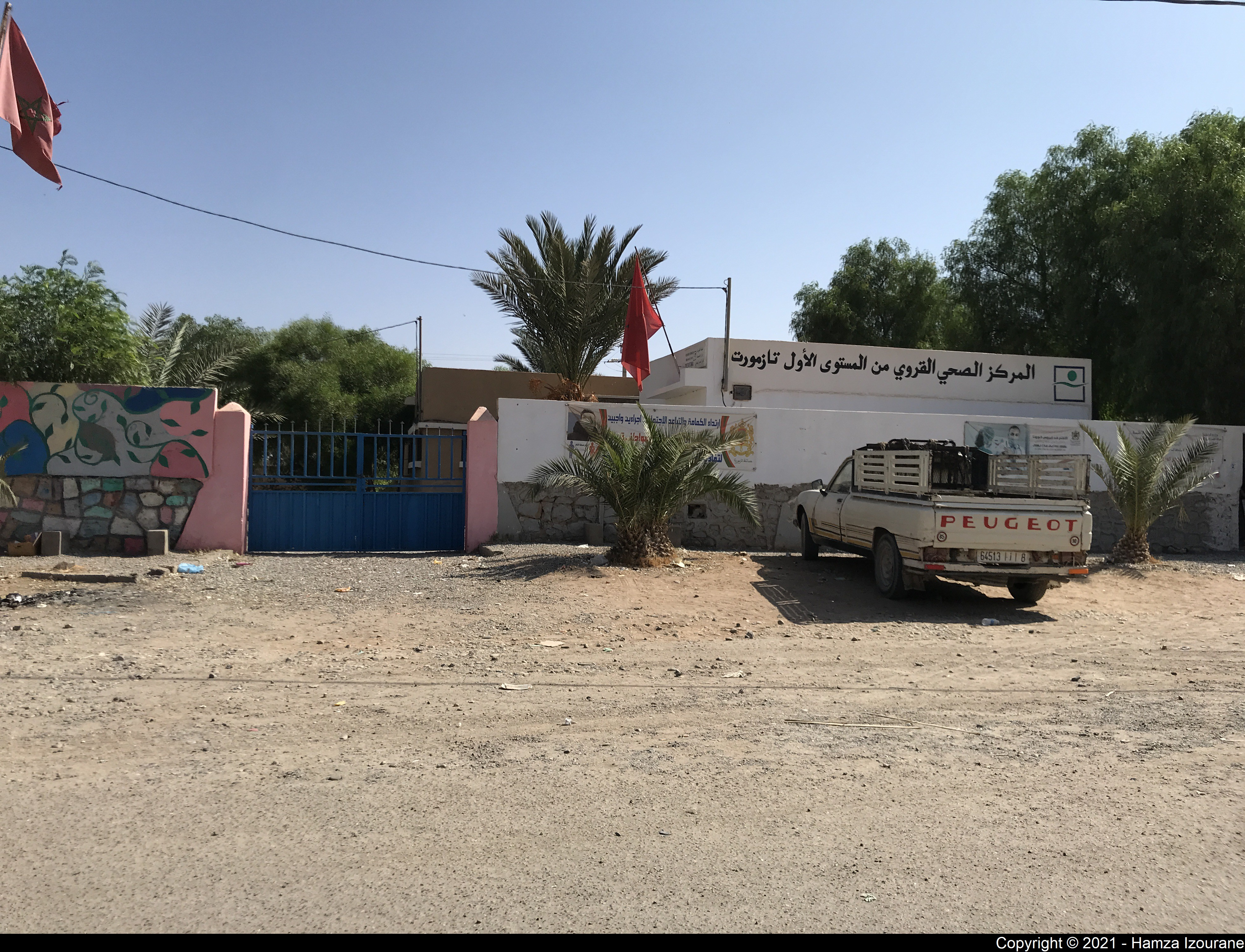
- Tazemmourt Health Center
- Interactive map of Tazemmourt
- Coordinates: 30°24′26″N 8°49′41″W
- Country: Morocco
- Region: Souss-Massa-Drâa
- Province: Taroudant Province

Population (2004)
  - Total: 5,676
- Time zone: UTC+0 (GMT)

Tazemmourt is a small town and rural commune in Taroudant Province of the Souss-Massa-Drâa region of Morocco. At the time of the 2004 census, the commune had a total population of 5676 people living in 985 households.
