= Amalou =

Amalou may refer to,

- Amalou, Algeria
- Amalou, Morocco
