= Sidi Hsaine =

Sidi Hsaine ⵙⵉⴷⵉ ⵃⵙⴰⵢⵏ سيدي حساين
- Rural commune and town
- Interactive map of Sidi Hsaine
- Country: Morocco
- Region: Souss-Massa-Drâa
- Province: Taroudant Province

Population (2004)
  - Total: 7,507
- Time zone: UTC+0 (GMT)

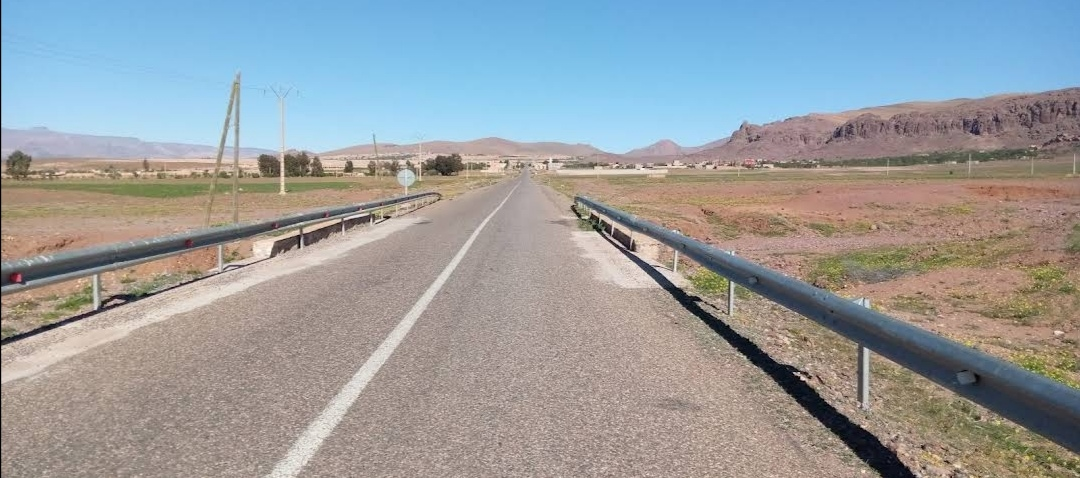
Road to Sidi Hsaine

Sidi Hsaine (Arabic: سيدي حساين) (Tachelhit: ⵙⵉⴷⵉ ⵃⵙⴰⵢⵏ) is a small town and rural commune in Taroudant Province of the Souss-Massa-Drâa region of Morocco. At the time of the 2004 census, the commune had a total population of 7507 people living in 1222 households.
