= Tiout =

Tiout may refer to,

- Tiout, Algeria
- Tiout, Morocco
