= Tabia, Taroudannt =

Tabia
- Rural commune and town
- Location within Morocco
- Country: Morocco
- Region: Souss-Massa-Drâa
- Province: Taroudannt Province

Population (2004)
  - Total: 2,329
- Time zone: UTC+0 (GMT)

Tabia is a small town and rural commune in Taroudannt Province of the Souss-Massa-Drâa region of Morocco. At the time of the 2004 census, the commune had a total population of 2,329 people living in 487 households.
