= Sidi Abdellah Ou Said =

Coordinates: 31°34′N 9°33′W

- Rural commune and town
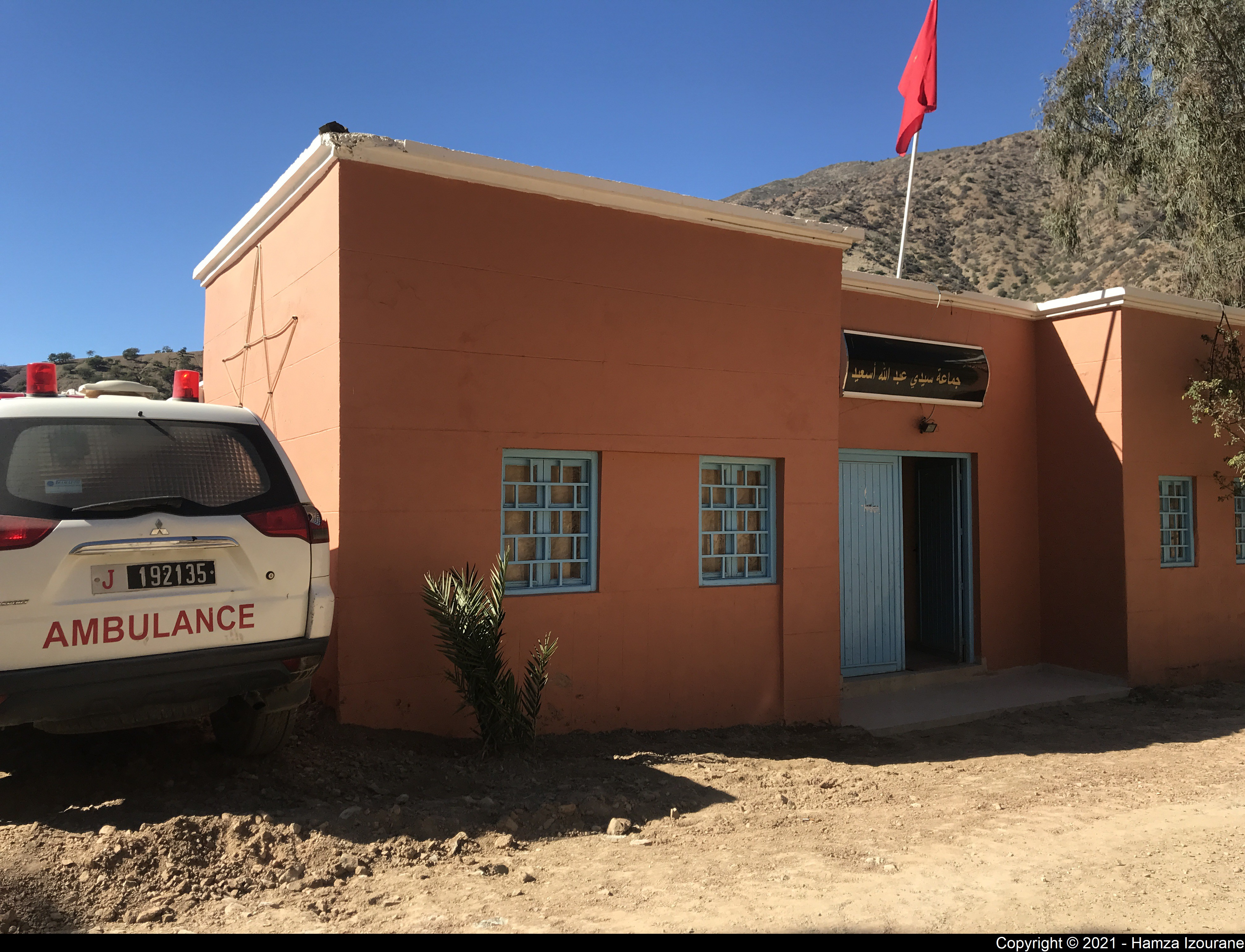
- Interactive map of Sidi Abdellah Ou Said
- Country: Morocco
- Region: Souss-Massa-Drâa
- Province: Taroudant Province

Population (2004)
  - Total: 4,014
- Time zone: UTC+0 (GMT)

Sidi Abdellah Ou Said is a small town and rural commune in Taroudant Province of the Souss-Massa-Drâa region of Morocco. At the time of the 2004 census, the commune had a total population of 4014 people living in 662 households.
