= Imaouen =

- Rural commune and town
- Interactive map of Imaouen
- Country: Morocco
- Region: Souss-Massa-Drâa
- Province: Taroudant Province

Population (2004)
  - Total: 3,103
- Time zone: UTC+0 (GMT)

Imaouen is a small town and rural commune in Taroudant Province of the Souss-Massa-Drâa region of Morocco. At the time of the 2004 census, the commune had a total population of 3103 people living in 639 households.
