= Ait Igas =

Coordinates: 30.596745°N 8.769755°W

- Rural commune and town
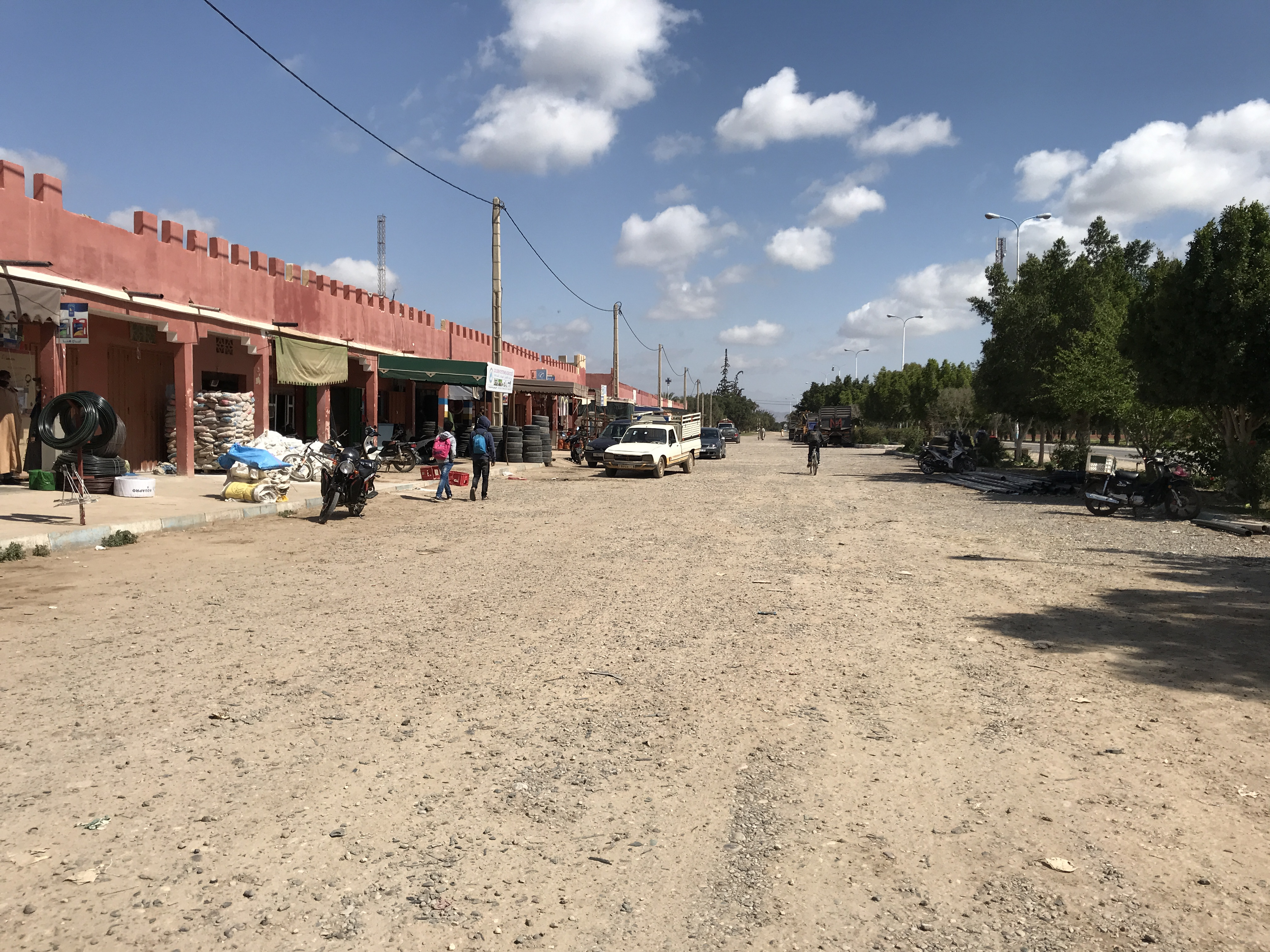
- Central Ait Igas
- Interactive map of Ait Igas
- Country: Morocco
- Region: Souss-Massa-Drâa
- Province: Taroudant Province

Population (2004)
  - Total: 9,553
- Time zone: UTC+0 (GMT)

Ait Igas is a small town and rural commune in Taroudant Province of the Souss-Massa-Drâa region of Morocco. At the time of the 2004 census, the commune had a total population of 9553 people living in 1308 households.
