= Tizi N'Test =

Tizi N'Test ⵜⵉⵣⵉ ⵏ ⵜⴰⵙⵜ تيزي نتاست
- Rural commune and town
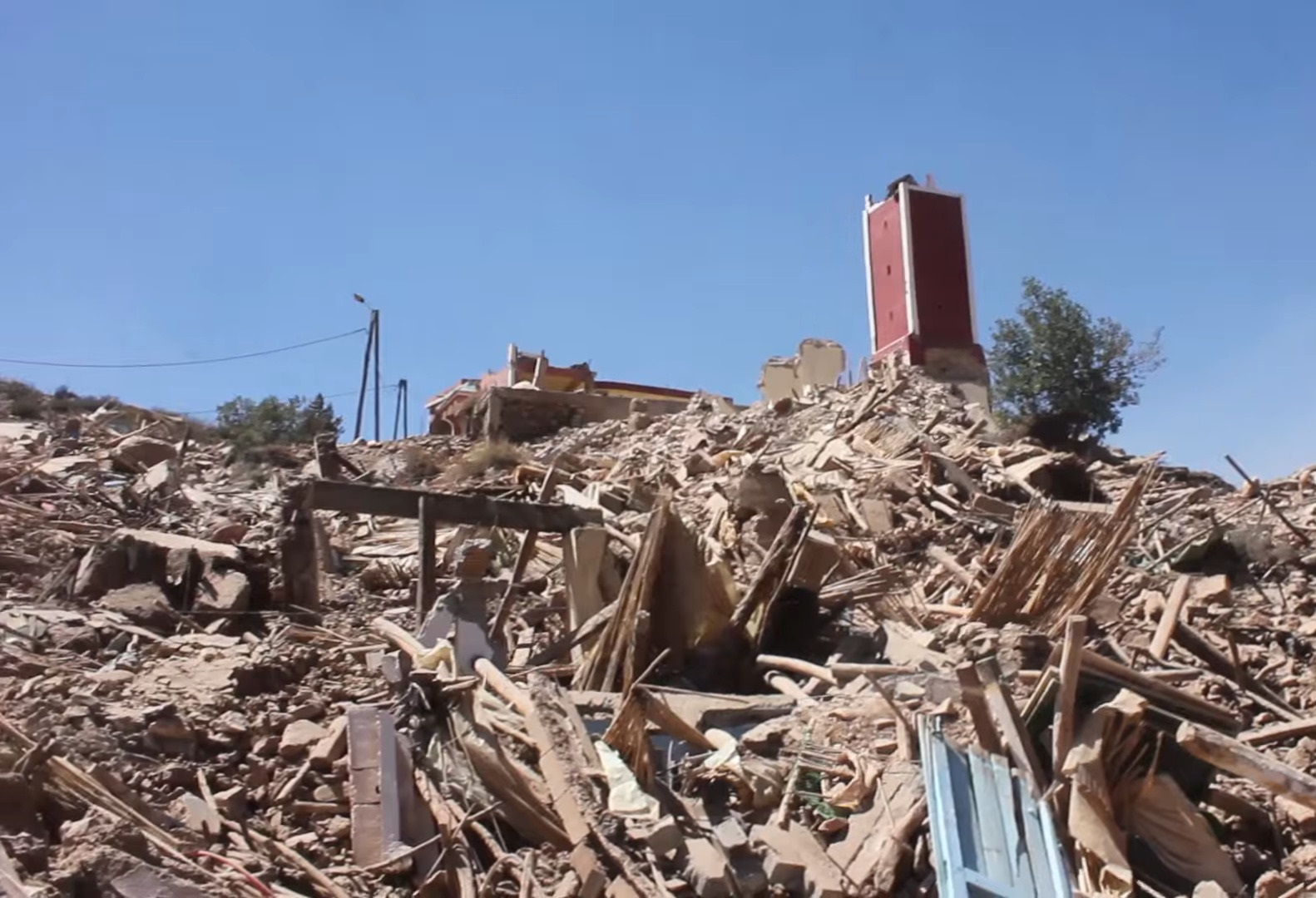
- Damage in Tizi N'Test following the 2023 Marrakesh-Safi earthquake
- Interactive map of Tizi N'Test
- Coordinates: 30°50′40″N 08°23′24″W
- Country: Morocco
- Region: Souss-Massa-Drâa
- Province: Taroudant Province

Population (2004)
  - Total: 5,391
- Time zone: UTC+0 (GMT)

Tizi N'Test is a small town and rural commune in Taroudant Province of the Souss-Massa-Drâa region of Morocco. At the time of the 2004 census, the commune had a total population of 5,391 people living in 906 households.

== History ==
The town suffered heavy damage in the 2023 Marrakesh-Safi earthquake.
