= Oulad Berhil =

Coordinates: 30.640783°N 8.475008°W

Oulad Berhil اولاد برحيل
- Town
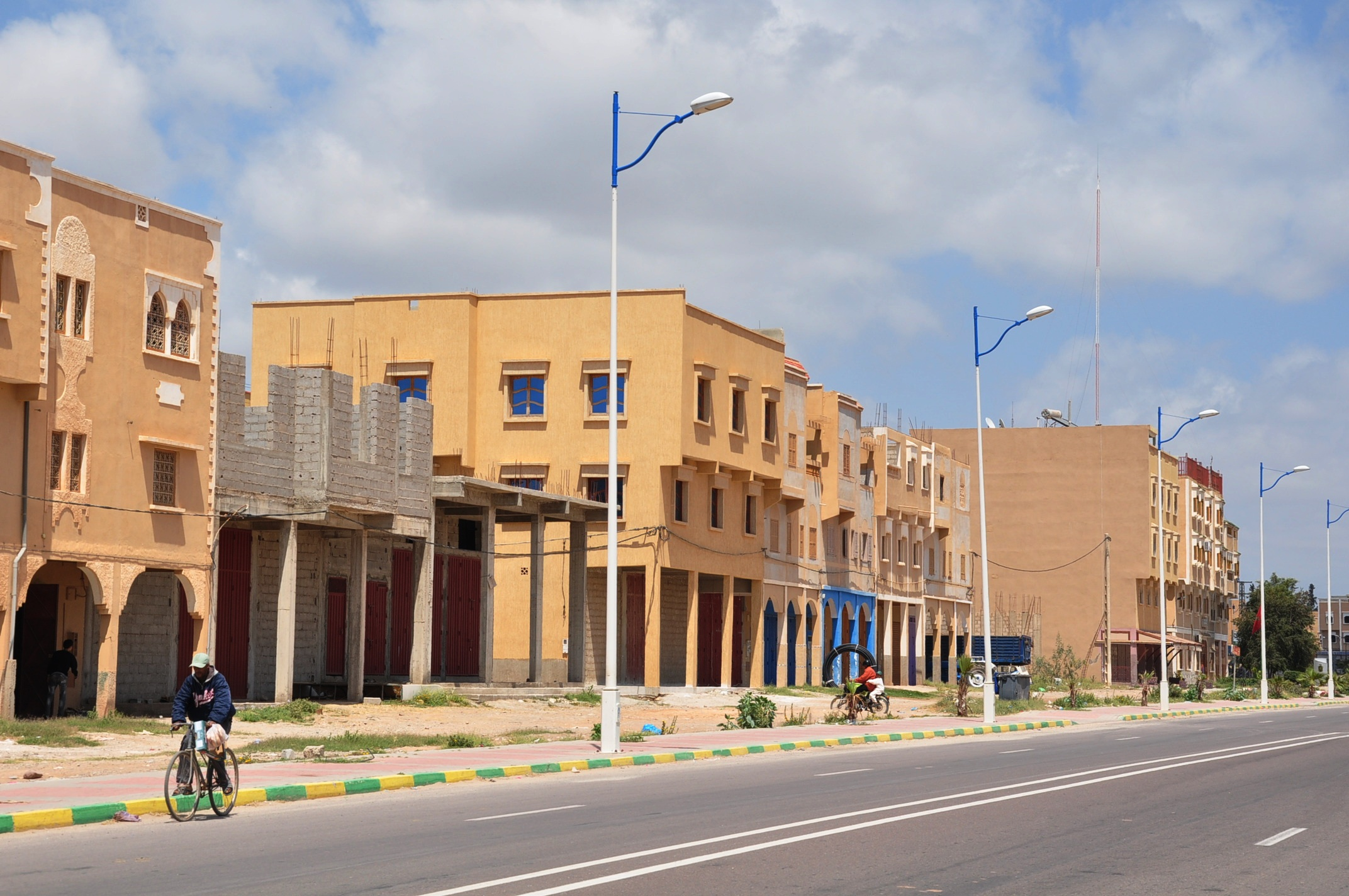
- Main street in Oulad Berhil around noon
- Interactive map of Oulad Berhil
- Country: Morocco
- Region: Souss-Massa
- Province: Taroudant
- Elevation: 1,610 ft (490 m)

Population (2013)
  - Total: 23,230 (est.)
- Time zone: UTC+0 (GMT)

Oulad Berhil (also: Ouled Berhil or Olad Berhil. Arabic: اولاد برحيل) is a town in the valley of the Sous River in Taroudant Province, Souss-Massa region, Morocco. The town has grown explosively over the last two decades, from 9,211 inhabitants in 1994 to 15,359 in 2004 and to an estimated 23,230 in 2013.

Oulad Berhil is noted for its old Kasbah, 800m south of the main road (signposted from the town centre), which has been turned into a sumptuous hotel-restaurant, the Riad Hida. It is also known as alhofra (الحفرة) by its young generations on social media.
