= Oulad Aissa =

Oulad Aissa أولاد عيسى Ouled Aissa
- Rural commune and town
- Location within Morocco
- Coordinates: 30.558°N 8.614°W
- Country: Morocco
- Region: Souss-Massa
- Province: Taroudant Province

Population (2004)
  - Total: 9,736
- Time zone: UTC+0 (GMT)

Oulad Aissa is a small town and rural commune in Taroudant Province of the Souss-Massa region of Morocco. At the time of the 2004 census, the commune had a total population of 9,736 people living in 1,636 households.
