= El Faid =

- Rural commune and town
- Location within Morocco
- Coordinates: 30°37′N 8°13′W
- Country: Morocco
- Region: Souss-Massa-Drâa
- Province: Taroudant Province

Population (2004)
  - Total: 12,811
- Time zone: UTC+0 (GMT)

El Faid is a small town and rural commune in Taroudant Province of the Souss-Massa-Drâa region of Morocco. At the time of the 2004 census, the commune had a total population of 12,811 people living in 1,983 households.
