= El Guerdane =

Coordinates: 29.65°N 7.95°W

- Town
- Interactive map of El Guerdane
- Country: Morocco
- Region: Souss-Massa
- Province: Taroudant

Population (2004)
  - Total: 9,222
- Time zone: UTC+0 (GMT)

El Guerdane is a town in Taroudant Province, Souss-Massa, Morocco. According to the 2004 census it has a population of 9,222.
