= Arazan =

Rural commune and town in Souss-Massa, Morocco

Coordinates: 30°30′N 8°36′W

Arazan ⴰⵔⴰⵣⴰⵏ أَرَزَانْ
- Rural commune and town
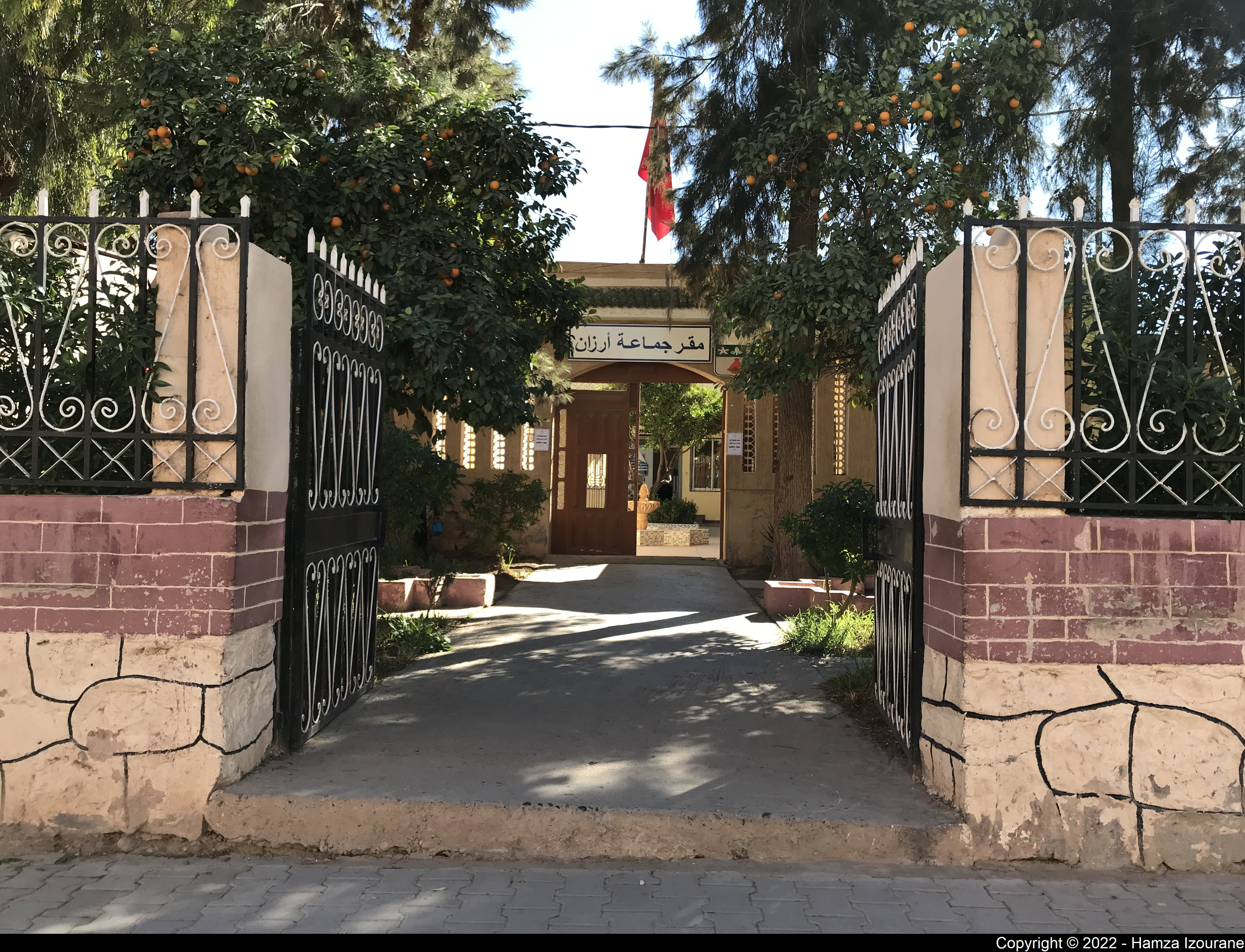
- Interactive map of Arazan
- Country: Morocco
- Region: Suss-Massa
- Province: Taroudant Province

Population (2014)
  - Total: 7,999
- Time zone: UTC+0 (GMT)

Arazan (Arabic: ارزان) is a small town and rural commune in Taroudant Province of the Souss-Massa region of Morocco. At the time of the 2014 census, the commune had a total population of 7999 people living in 1422 households.

The town was home to a significant population of Berber Jews until their departure to Israel in the mid-1960s. A synagogue preserved by the local inhabitants was restored in 2010 by Jewish philanthropist Peter Geffen and Jewish-Moroccan tour guide Raphael David Elmaleh.
