= Irherm =

Coordinates: 30°05′15″N 8°27′35″W

Irherm ⵉⵖⵔⵎ / إغرم
- Town
- Interactive map of Irherm
- Country: Morocco
- Region: Souss-Massa
- Province: Taroudant

Population (2004)
  - Total: 4,624
- Time zone: UTC+0 (GMT)

Irherm (Standard Moroccan Tamazight: ⵉⵖⵔⵎ, Arabic: إغرم, also spelled Igherm) is a town in Taroudant Province, Souss-Massa, Morocco. According to the 2004 census it has a population of 4,624.

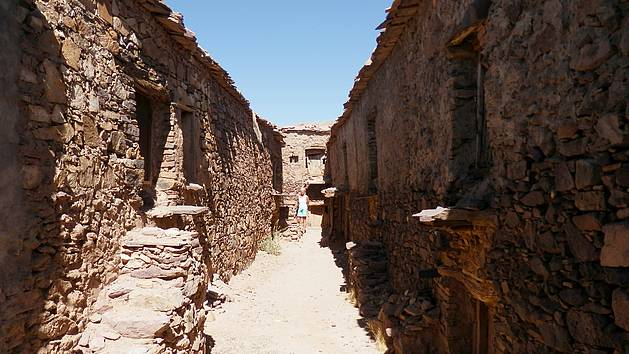
The fortified storehouse (agadir) of Irherm
