= Amalou, Morocco =

Amalou
- Rural commune and town
- Location within Morocco Location within Africa
- Country: Morocco
- Region: Souss-Massa-Drâa
- Province: Taroudant Province

Population (2004)
  - Total: 3,873
- Time zone: UTC+0 (GMT)

Amalou is a small town and rural commune that is located in the Taroudant Province of the Souss-Massa-Drâa region of Morocco. At the time of the 2004 census, the commune had a total population of 3,873 people living in 809 households.
