= Nihit =

- Rural commune and town
- Location within Morocco
- Coordinates: 30.3128°N 8.5146°W
- Country: Morocco
- Region: Souss-Massa
- Province: Taroudant

Population (2004)
  - Total: 2,357
- Time zone: UTC+0 (GMT)

Nihit is a small town and rural commune in Taroudant Province of the Souss-Massa region of Morocco. At the time of the 2004 census, the commune had a total population of 2,357 people living in 549 households.
