= Tiout, Morocco =

Tiout
- Rural commune and town
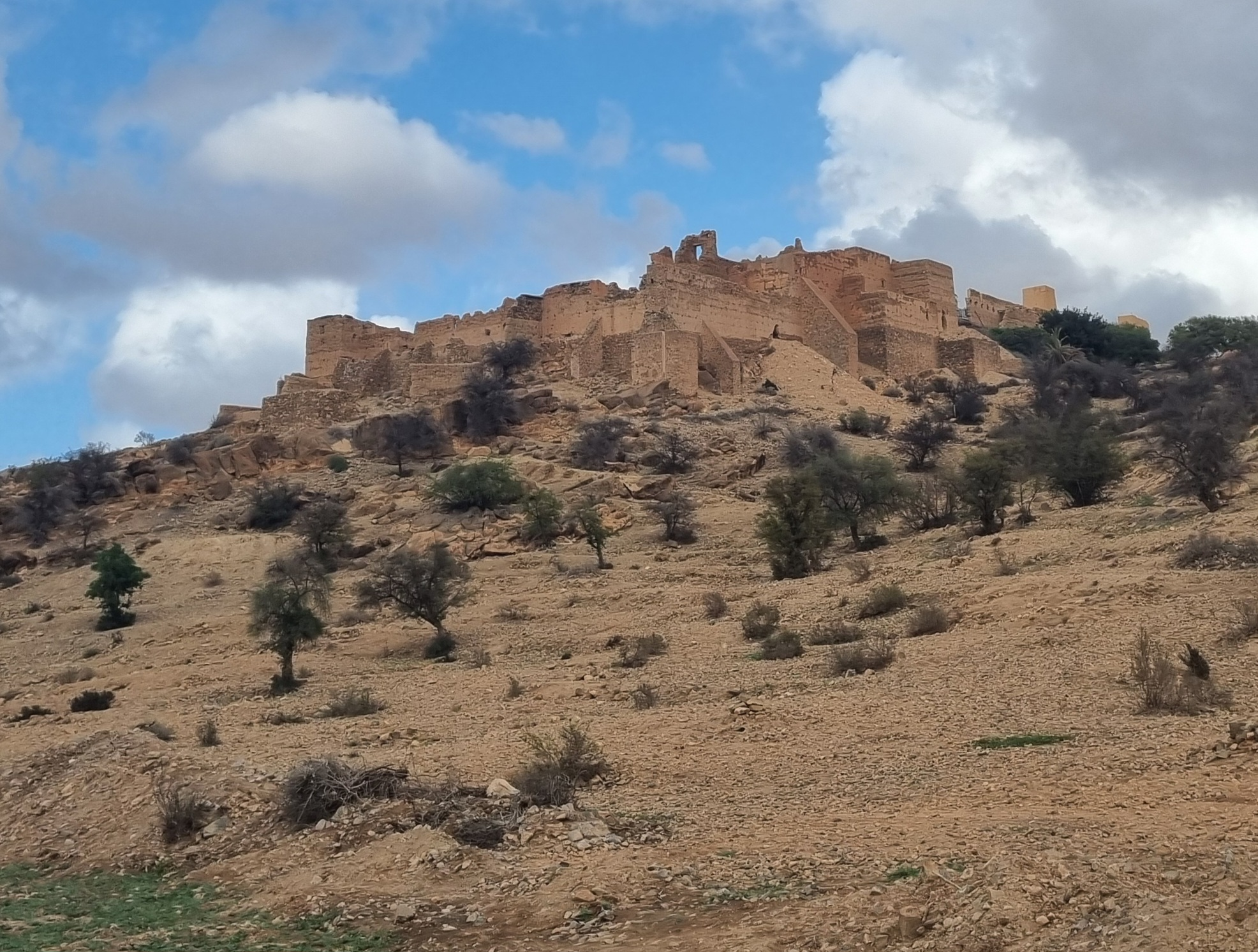
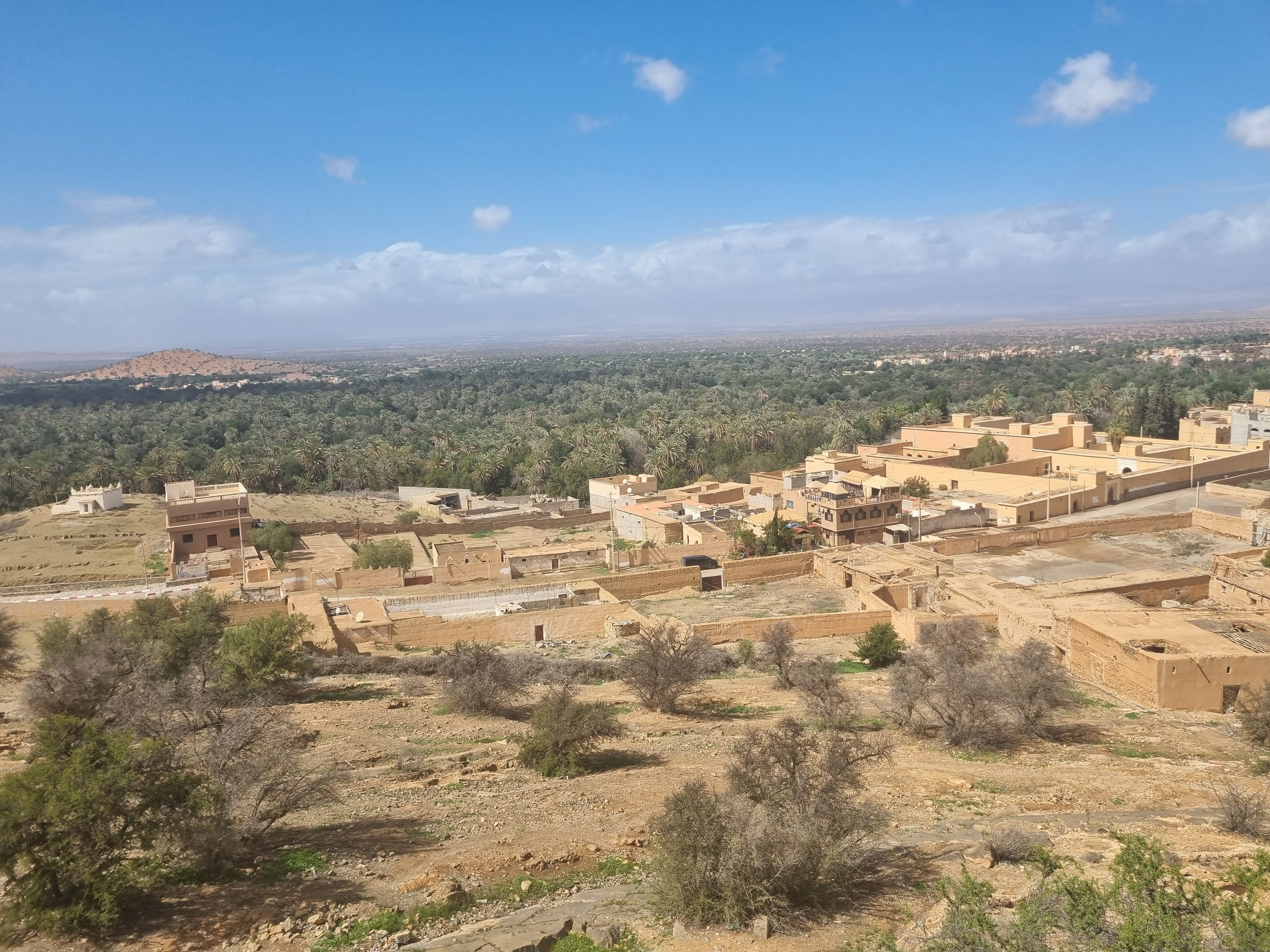

- Location within Morocco
- Coordinates: 29°57′N 9°21′W
- Country: Morocco
- Region: Souss-Massa-Drâa
- Province: Taroudant Province

Population (2014)
  - Total: 2,920
- Time zone: UTC+0 (GMT)

Tiout (Shilha Tiyyiwt) is a small town and rural commune in Taroudant Province of the Souss-Massa-Drâa region of Morocco. At the 2014 census, the commune had a total population of 2,920 people living in 664 households.
