= Igli, Morocco =

Coordinates: 29.500074°N 9.050086°W

Igli
- Rural commune and town
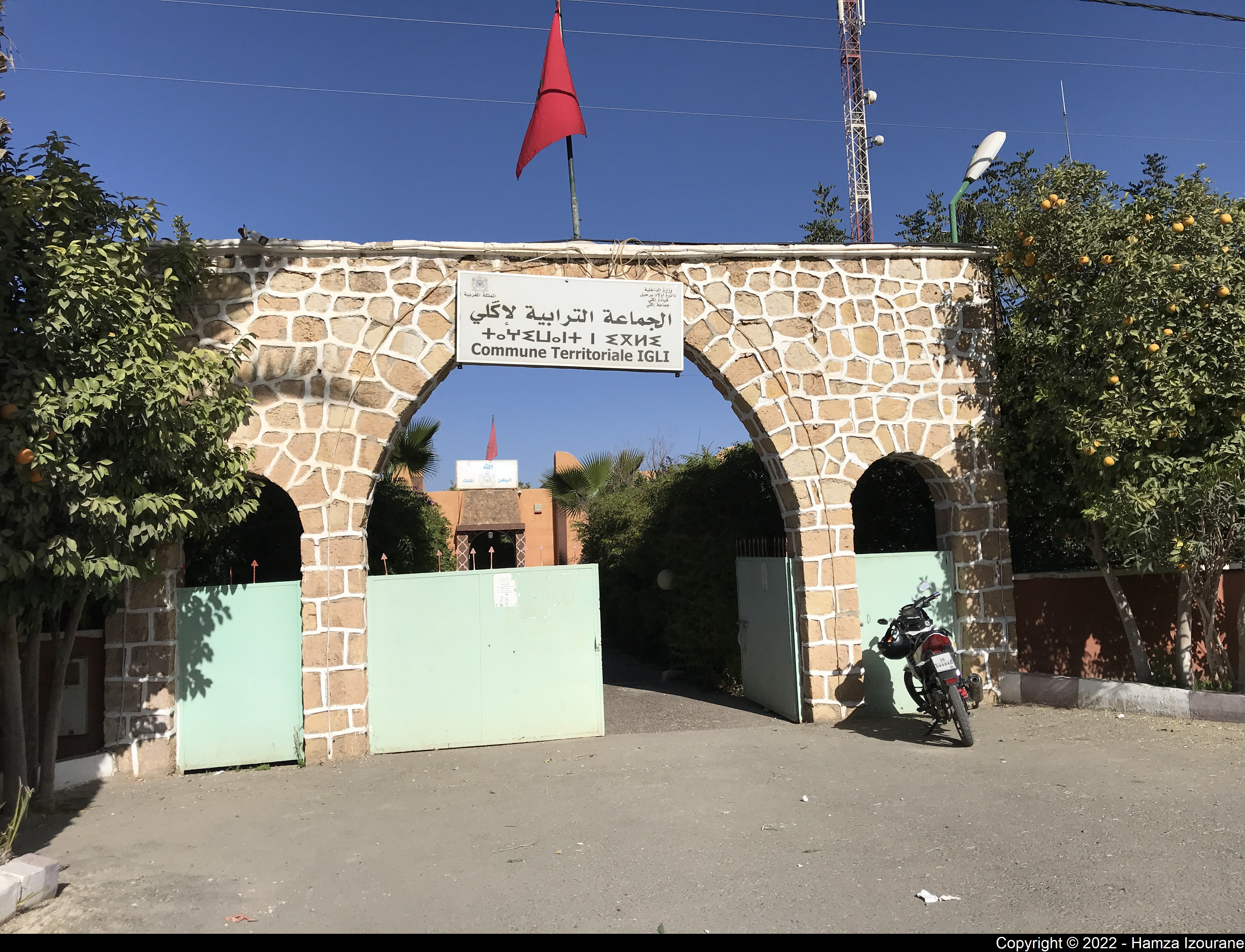
- Entrance to Igli
- Interactive map of Igli
- Country: Morocco
- Region: Souss-Massa-Drâa
- Province: Taroudant Province

Population (2004)
  - Total: 10,034
- Time zone: UTC+0 (WET)
  - Summer (DST): UTC+1 (WEST)

Igli is a small town and rural commune in Taroudant Province of the Souss-Massa-Drâa region of Morocco. At the time of the 2004 census, the commune had a total population of 10,034 people living in 1658 households.

During the 9th-century, Igli was the capital of the sous vice-royalty headed by one of Idriss II sons, it controlled Nafis to the north and Tamdoult in the south. The principality quickly lost control over these cities to the lords of Aghmat and Sijilmasa.
