= Mary Alice Faid =

British writer

- Born: 21 January 1897; Greenock, Scotland
- Died: 14 January 1990 (aged 92); Helensburgh, Scotland
- Spouse: Alexander Carson Dunn
- Writing career
- Genres: Children's literature, religious fiction, romantic fiction

Mary Alice Faid (21 January 1897 – 14 January 1990), was a Scottish writer of children's books, mostly religious fiction, and of adult fiction.

== Personal life ==
Mary Alice Faid was born in Greenock, Scotland, in 1897. Her father was a butcher. She may have attended the University of Glasgow. She married Alexander Carson Dunn in 1923 in the Primitive Methodist Church; he was a teacher. She died in Helensburgh, Scotland, in 1990.

Faid is best known for the Trudy series of ten books for children. These take the eponymous heroine from school age to adult life, with an emphasis on her involvement with the evangelistic movement and urban missions. As well as Faid's prolific output of romantic novels, she also wrote stories for women's magazines. She published as both Mary Alice Faid and Mary Faid.

== Selected books ==
=== Trudy series ===
- Trudy Takes Charge (Pickering & Inglis, 1949)
- Trudy's Island Holiday (Pickering & Inglis, 1950)
- Trudy's Uphill Road (Pickering & Inglis, 1951)
- Trudy's College Days (Pickering & Inglis, 1953)
- School Ma'am Trudy (Pickering & Inglis, 1955)
- Trudy on Her Own (Pickering & Inglis, 1957)
- Trudy's Small Corner (Pickering & Inglis, 1959)
- Trudy Married (Pickering & Inglis, 1961)
- Trudy in Demand (Pickering & Inglis, 1964)
- Trudy and Family (Pickering & Inglis, 1970)

=== Adult romance fiction ===
- Dear Dominie (Hurst & Blackett, 1954)
- A Bride for the Laird (Hurst & Blackett, 1955)
- Stairway to Happiness (Hurst & Blackett, 1955)
- Dance to your Shadow (Hurst & Blackett, 1956)
- The Singing Rain (Hurst & Blackett, 1958)
- Rodrick's Isle (Hurst & Blackett, 1959)
- Mrs. Drummond's Daughters (Hurst & Blackett, 1960)
- Daffodil Square (Hurst & Blackett, 1962)
- Love Will Venture In (Hurst & Blackett, 1963), serialised in Woman's Weekly
- The Glass Keepsake (Hurst & Blackett, 1965)
- The Walls of Rossa (Hurst & Blackett, 1967)
- The Rowan in the Rock (Hurst & Blackett, 1969)
- The Other Side of the Park (Hurst and Blackett, 1972)
- First Love, Second Love (Hurst and Blackett, 1974)
- The Daughter at Home (Hale, 1977)
- The Marshalls of Croma (Hale, 1977)
- No Stars so Bright (Hale, 1978)
- A Kiss for the Teacher (Hale, 1979)
- The Summer of the Wedding (Hale, 1980)
- Love's Ebbing Tide (Hale, 1983)
