= Taroudant Province =

Province of Morocco

Coordinates: 30°28′1″N 8°52′48″W

Taroudant Province إقليم تارودانت ⵜⴰⵙⴳⴰ ⵏ ⵜⵔⵓⴷⴰⵏⵜ
- Province
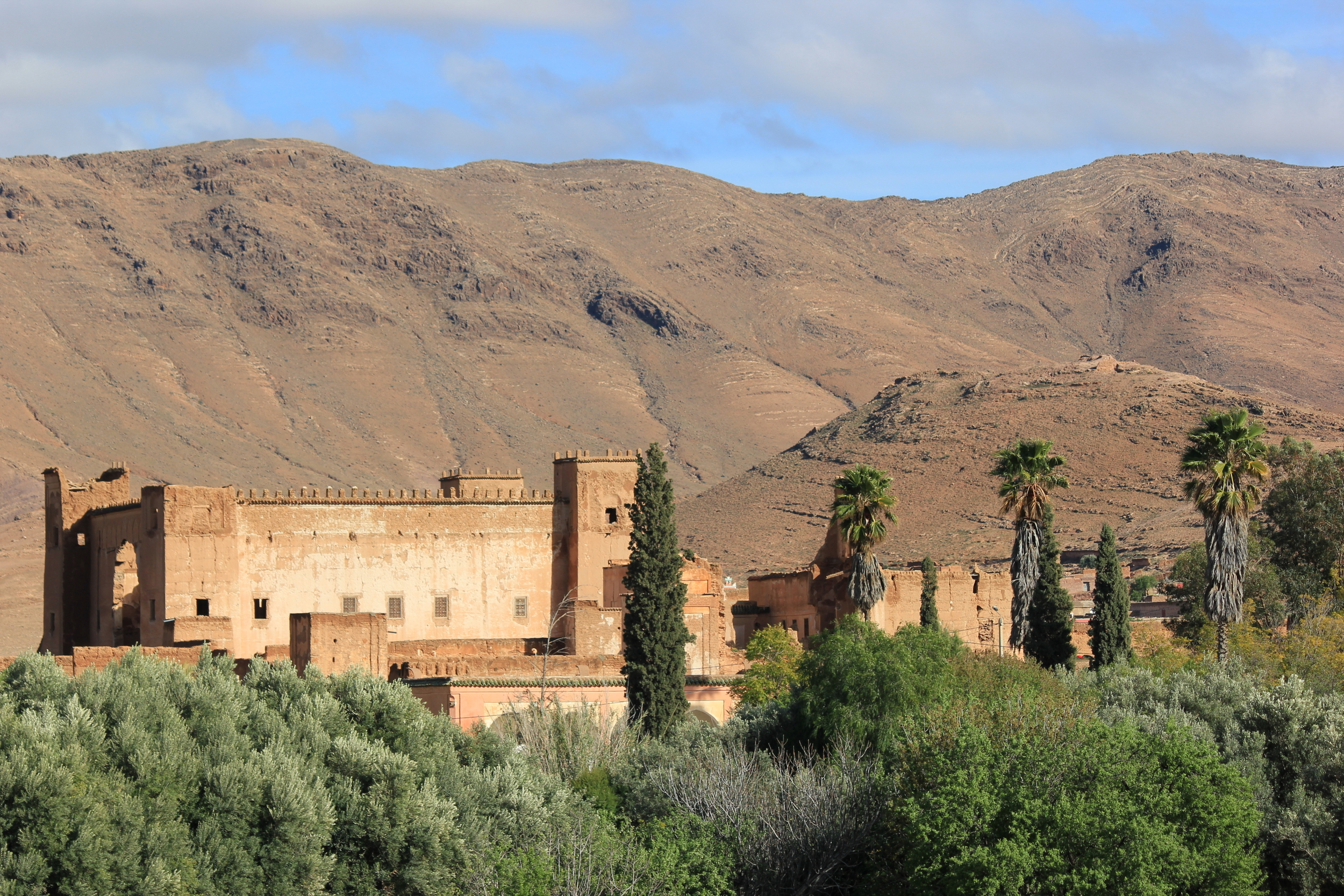
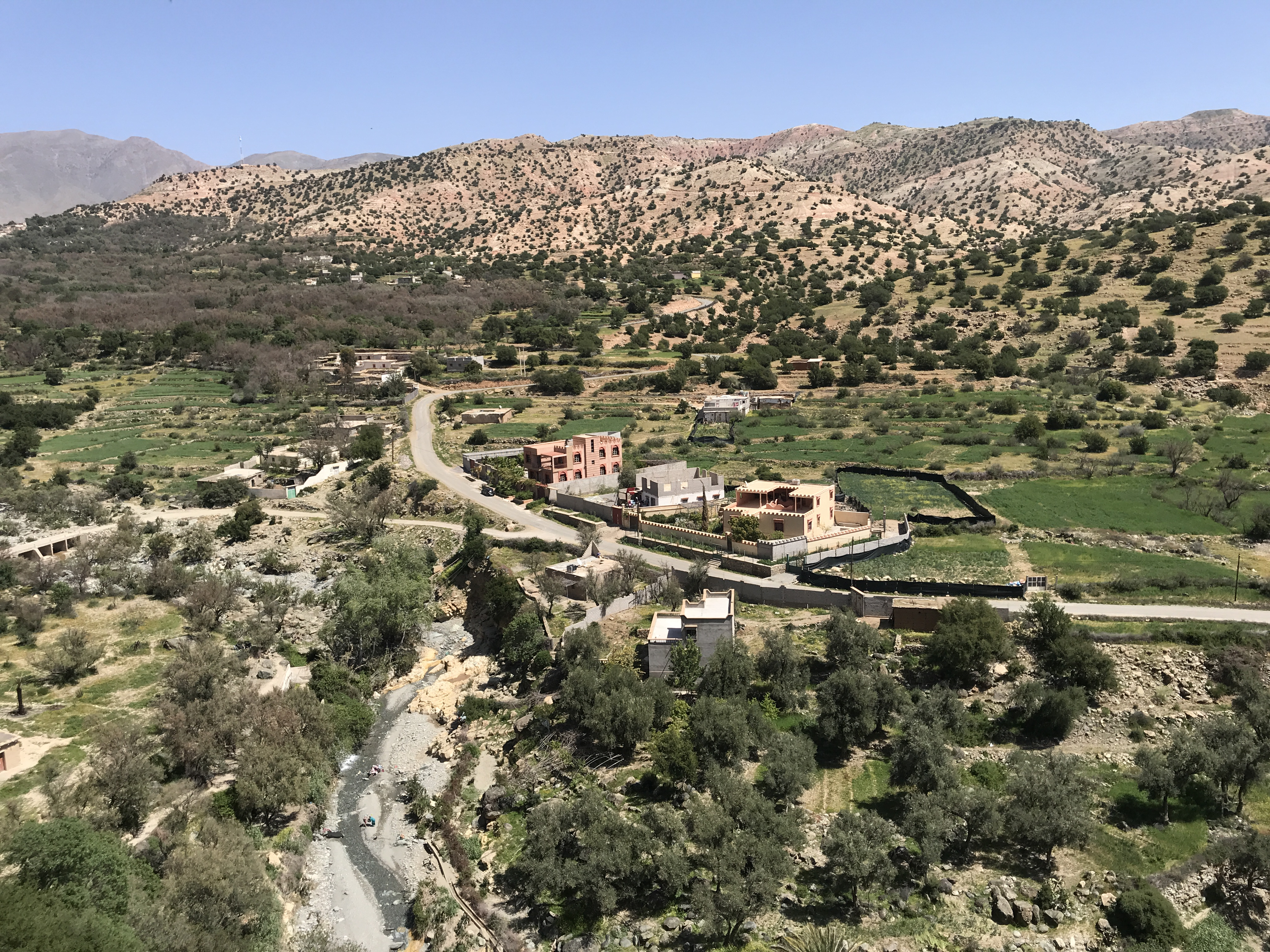
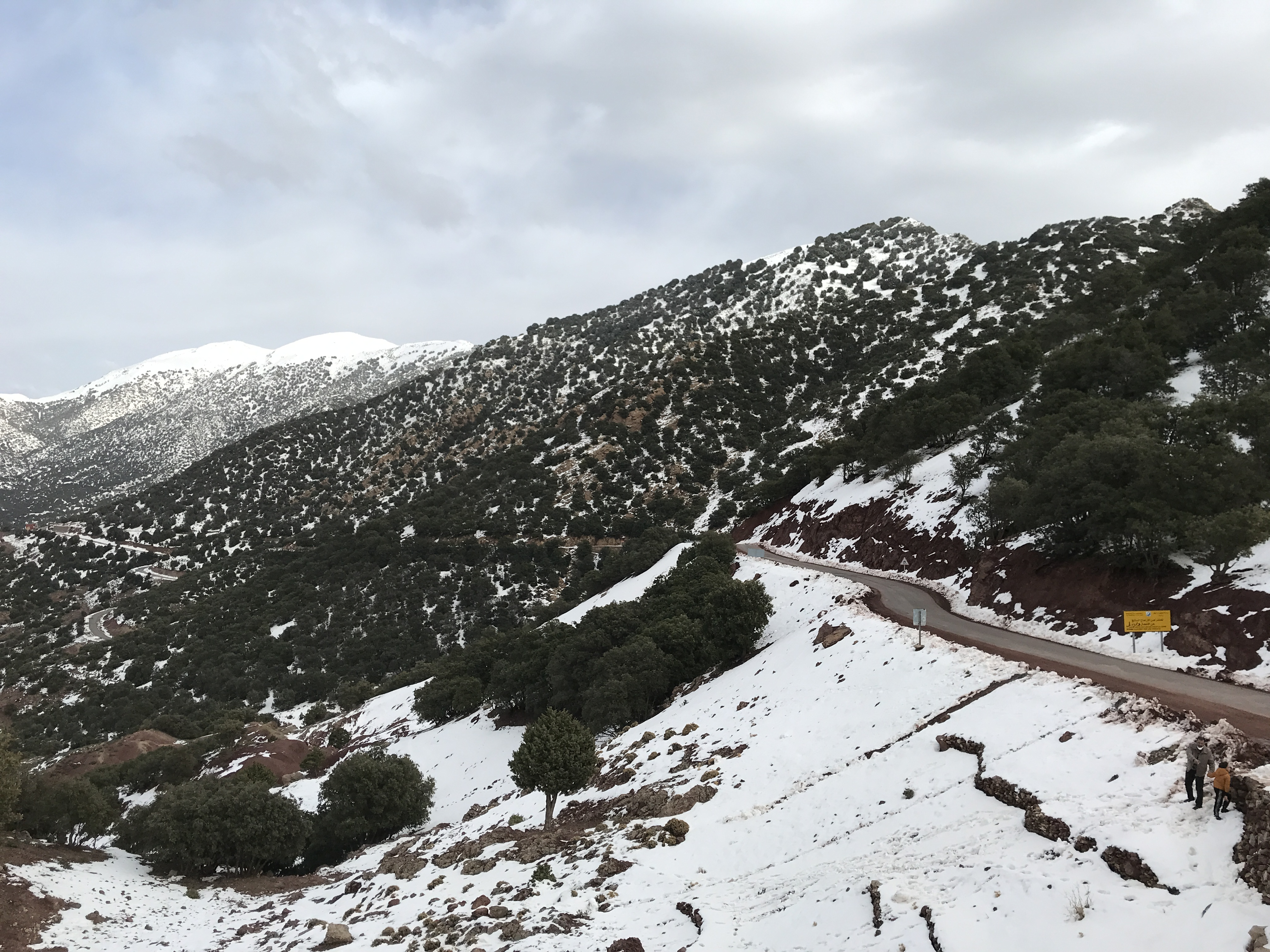
- The Kasbah of Taliouine The village of Afensou, Imoulass Tizi N'Test heights in winter
- Interactive map of Taroudant Province
- Country: Morocco
- Region: Souss-Massa
- Seat: Taroudant

Population (2024)
  - Total: 857,673

Taroudant (Arabic: تارودانت, romanized: Tārūdānt; Standard Moroccan Tamazight: ⵜⴰⵔⵓⴷⴰⵏⵜ, romanized: Tarudant) is a province in the Moroccan region of Souss-Massa. Its population in 2024 is 857,673.

The major cities and towns are:

- Ait Iaaza
- Aoulouz
- El Guerdane
- Irherm
- Oulad Berhil
- Oulad Teima
- Taliouine
- Taroudant

== Subdivisions ==
Communes of Taroudant Province

The province is divided administratively into the following:

=== Rural communes ===
Name	Geographic code	Households (2024)	Population (2024)
Adar	541.03.01.	1058	3043
Agadir Melloul	541.07.01.	1697	7518
Ahl Ramel	541.05.01.	1849	7496
Ahl Tifnoute	541.07.03.	1114	5196
Ahmar Laglalcha	541.11.01.	5069	21659
Ait Abdallah	541.03.03.	643	1635
Ait Igas	541.09.03.	2195	10378
Ait Makhlouf	541.09.05.	1035	4135
Amalou	541.03.05.	668	2188
Arazane	541.04.09.	1812	7883
Argana	541.11.03.	1023	4123
Askaouen	541.07.05.	1553	7046
Assads	541.05.05.	1058	3592
Assaisse	541.07.07.	1590	5934
Assaki	541.07.09.	1886	8048
Azaghar N'Irs	541.03.07.	1161	4009
Azrar	541.07.11.	1067	4242
Bigoudine	541.11.07.	1056	4174
Bounrar	541.09.11.	1302	4995
Eddir	541.11.09.	1732	7781
El Faid	541.04.13.	2616	10559
El Koudia El Beida	541.05.11.	5582	23666
Freija	541.09.15.	1998	9005
Ida Ou Gailal	541.04.17.	1459	6036
Ida Ougoummad	541.04.21.	1913	7543
Ida Ou Moumen	541.11.19.	1432	5833
Igli	541.04.23.	3061	13832
Igoudar Mnabha	541.04.25.	2567	10974
Iguidi	541.07.13.	1733	7949
Imaouen	541.03.09.	623	1969
Imilmaiss	541.11.13.	1186	4967
Imi N'Tayart	541.03.11.	379	973
Imoulass	541.09.27.	1757	6889
Issen	541.11.15.	3163	13254
Lagfifat	541.05.17.	4671	19471
Lakhnafif	541.05.19.	2470	10706
Lamhadi	541.05.21.	2768	11927
Lamhara	541.04.29.	2656	11622
Lamnizla	541.11.31.	856	3427
Machraa El Ain	541.05.23.	3021	12243
Nihit	541.03.13.	516	1456
Oualqadi	541.03.15.	527	1477
Oulad Aissa	541.04.33.	2636	11732
Ouneine	541.04.35.	1783	7042
Ouzioua	541.07.37.	1748	8141
Sidi Abdellah Ou Said	541.04.39.	788	3003
Sidi Ahmed Ou Abdallah	541.09.41.	1023	4038
Sidi Ahmed Ou Amar	541.05.25.	4134	17914
Sidi Boaal	541.03.17.	778	2180
Sidi Borja	541.09.43.	2541	10736
Sidi Boumoussa	541.05.27.	5558	23160
Sidi Dahmane	541.09.45.	3423	14878
Sidi Hsaine	541.07.15.	1675	6716
Sidi Moussa Lhamri	541.11.29.	3814	17673
Sidi Mzal	541.03.19.	497	1373
Sidi Ouaaziz	541.04.47.	2227	9241
Tabia	541.03.21.	353	814
Tafingoult	541.04.49.	1442	5670
Tafraouten	541.09.51.	1622	7026
Talgjount	541.04.53.	1280	5234
Talmakante	541.11.33.	798	3336
Tamaloukte	541.09.55.	1072	4241
Taouyalte	541.07.17.	1576	7097
Tassousfi	541.07.19.	1546	5998
Tataoute	541.03.23.	1135	3767
Tazemmourt	541.09.57.	1699	6856
Tidsi Nissendalene	541.05.33.	1295	4395
Tigouga	541.04.59.	922	3867
Tindine	541.03.25.	640	1853
Tinzart	541.04.61.	1391	6127
Tiout	541.09.63.	824	3017
Tisfane	541.03.27.	478	1414
Tisrasse	541.07.65.	1371	5608
Tizgzaouine	541.07.21.	1267	4653
Tizi N'Test	541.04.67.	956	3588
Toubkal	541.07.23.	1834	8538
Toufelaazt	541.03.29.	358	1061
Toughmart	541.04.69.	1497	5035
Toumliline	541.03.31.	530	1463
Zagmouzen	541.07.25.	1672	7480
Zaouia Sidi Tahar	541.11.71.	3148	13479

=== Municipalities ===
Name	Geographic code	Households (2024)	Population (2024)
Ait Iaaza	541.01.01.	4145	17339
Aoulouz	541.01.02.	4605	21502
El Guerdane	541.01.03.	3292	13747
Irherm	541.01.05.	1310	4127
Oulad Berhil	541.01.07.	7068	30330
Oulad Teima	541.01.09.	24494	100284
Taliouine	541.01.11.	1753	7040
Taroudant	541.01.13.	21821	83496
