= Souss-Massa-Drâa =

Souss-Massa-Drâa Arabic: سوس ماسة درعة Berber languages: ⵙⵓⵙ-ⵎⴰⵙⵙⴰ-ⴷⵔⵄⴰ
- Region
- Location in Morocco
- Coordinates: 30°26′N 9°36′W
- Country: Morocco
- Created: 1997
- Abolished: September 2015
- Capital: Agadir

Area
  - Total: 70,880 km^{2} (27,370 sq mi)

Population (2014 census)
  - Total: 3,601,917
  - Density: 50.82/km^{2} (131.6/sq mi)
- Time zone: UTC+0 (WET)
  - Summer (DST): UTC+1 (WEST)

Souss-Massa-Drâa (Arabic: سوس ماسة درعة) was formerly one of the sixteen regions of Morocco from 1997 to 2015. It covered an area of 70,880 km^{2} and had a population of 3,601,917 (2014 census). The capital is Agadir. One of the major languages spoken in this region of Morocco is tasoussit variant of Tashelhit.

== Administrative divisions ==
The region was made up of the following provinces and prefectures:

- Prefecture of Agadir-Ida-Ou Tanane (now part of the Souss-Massa Region)
- Préfecture of Inezgane-Ait Melloul (now part of the Souss-Massa Region)
- Chtouka Ait Baha Province (now part of the Souss-Massa Region)
- Ouarzazate Province (now part of the Drâa-Tafilalet Region)
- Sidi Ifni Province (since 2009; now part of the Guelmim-Oued Noun Region)
- Taroudant Province (now part of the Souss-Massa Region)
- Tinghir Province (since 2009; now part of the Drâa-Tafilalet Region)
- Tiznit Province (now part of the Souss-Massa Region)
- Zagora Province (now part of the Drâa-Tafilalet Region)
