= Jbel Outgui =

Extinct volcano in Morocco

- Location within Morocco

Highest point
- Elevation: 1,400 m (4,600 ft)
- Coordinates: 33°38′34″N 5°14′49″W

Geography
- Location: Fès-Meknès, Morocco
- Parent range: Middle Atlas

Geology
- Rock age: Pleistocene
- Mountain type: Shield volcano

Jbel Outgui is an extinct shield volcano located 15 km southeast of the city of El Hajeb in the Middle Atlas of Morocco. The mountain is one of the three main volcanic structures of the Azrou region with Jbel El Koudiate and Jbel Tamarrakoit.

== See also ==
- Azrou volcanic field
