= Sebt Jahjouh =

Coordinates: 33°43′20″N 5°39′51″W

- Town
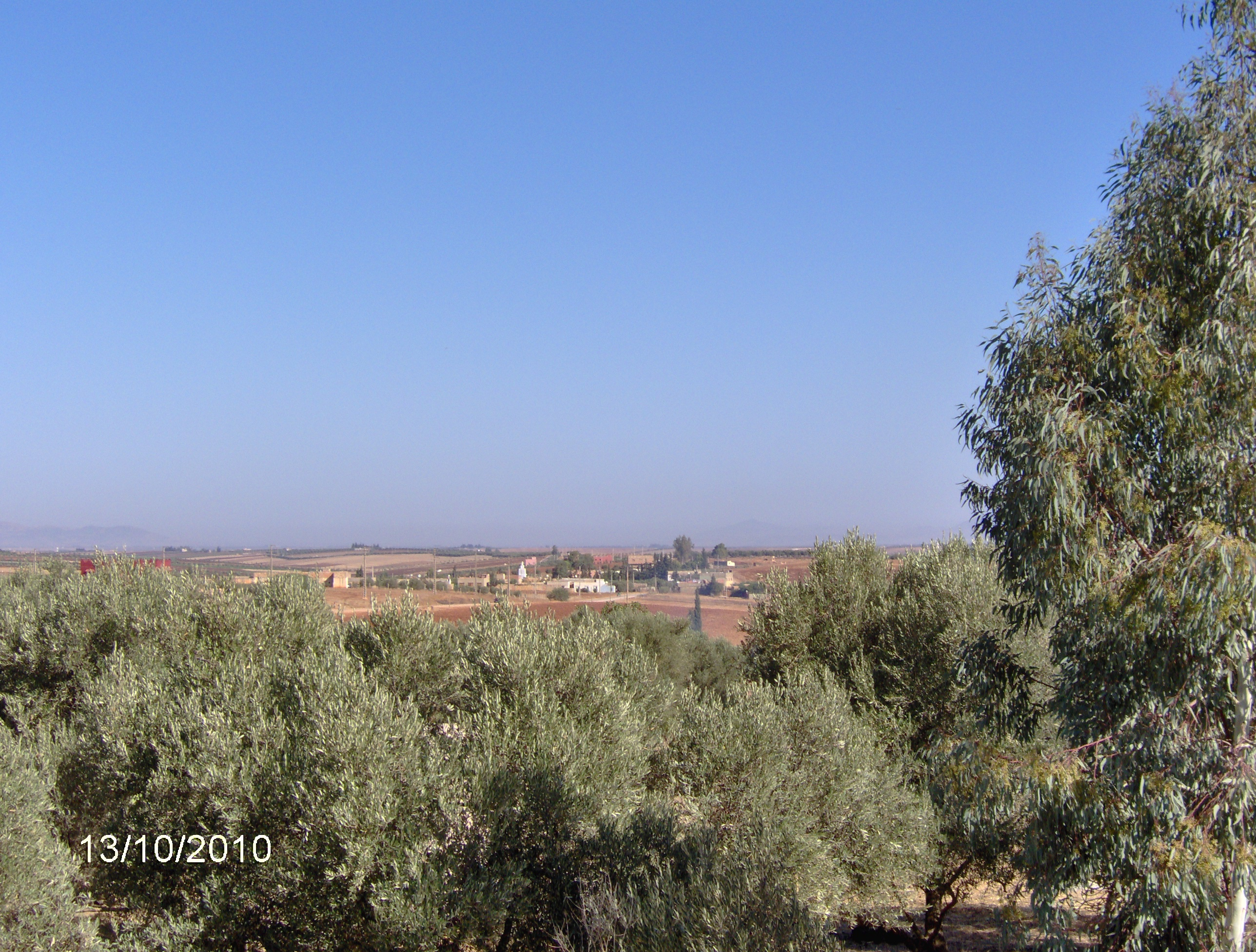
- Interactive map of Sebt Jahjouh
- Country: Morocco
- Region: Fès-Meknès
- Province: El Hajeb

Population (2004)
  - Total: 3,585
- Time zone: UTC+0 (GMT)

Sebt Jahjouh is a town in El Hajeb Province, Fès-Meknès, Morocco. According to the 2004 census it has a population of 3,585.
