= Bouazzaoui =

Bouazzaoui is a Moroccan surname. Notable people with the surname include:

- Abdelali Bouazzaoui (born 1991), Moroccan runner and trainer
- Fathallah Bouazzaoui (born 1942), Moroccan basketball player
