= Meknes Chamber of Traditional Artisanship =

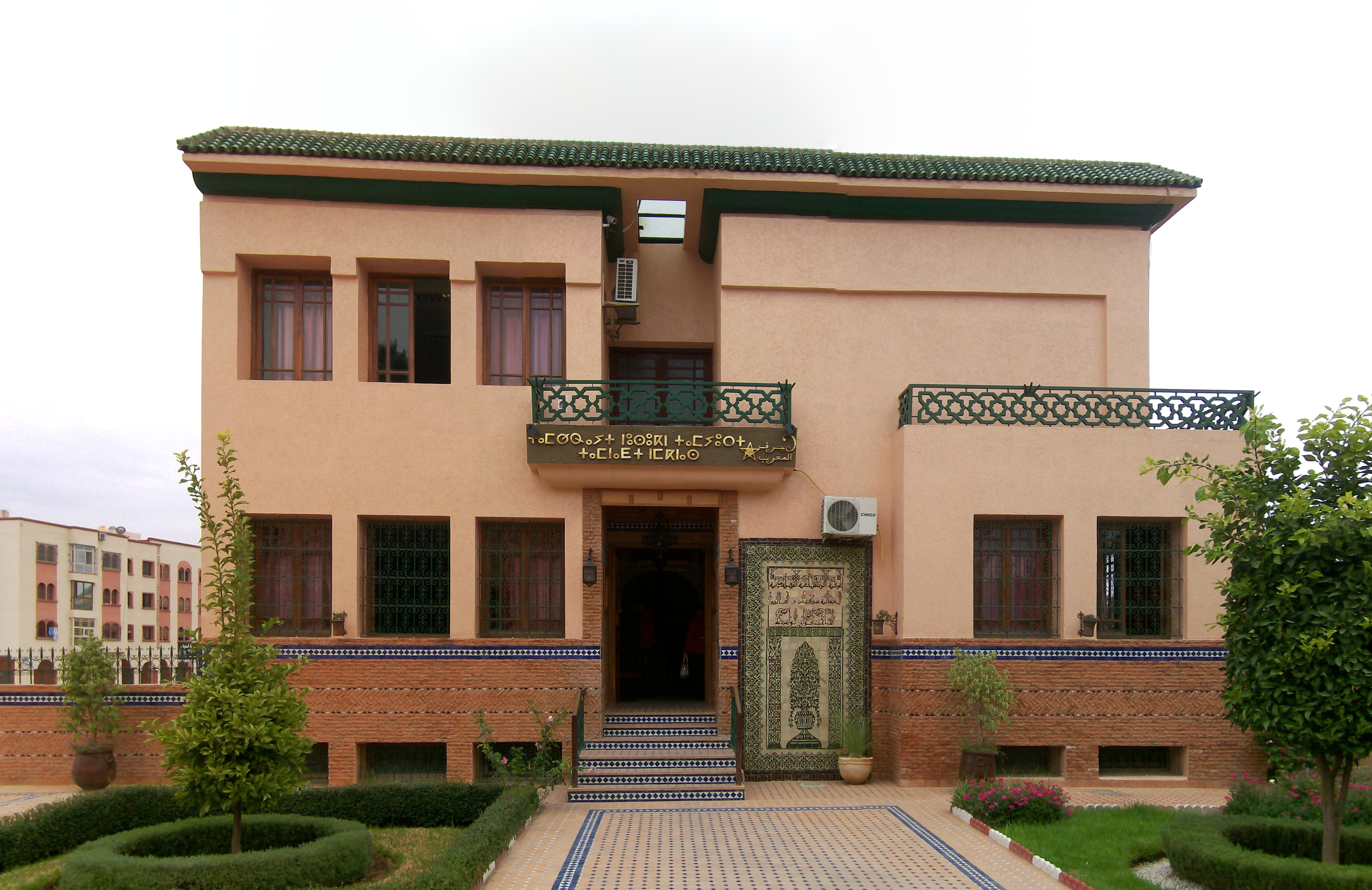
Administration Building

The Meknes Chamber of Traditional Artisanship (Arabic: غرف الصناعة التقليدية بمكناس) is a Moroccan government organization charged with the promotion of traditional Moroccan handicrafts through the training of artisans and craftsmen in the Meknes-Tafilalet region. Although the main campus is located in the city of Meknes, there are four satellite campuses spread around the region in Hajeb, Ifrane, Khenifra and Rashidiyya.

== Activities ==
The Chamber provides training in many of the traditional Moroccan handicrafts including: woodcarving, carpet making, decorative iron working, leather tanning, pottery, and traditional garment making.

=== Examples of the Chamber's Activities ===
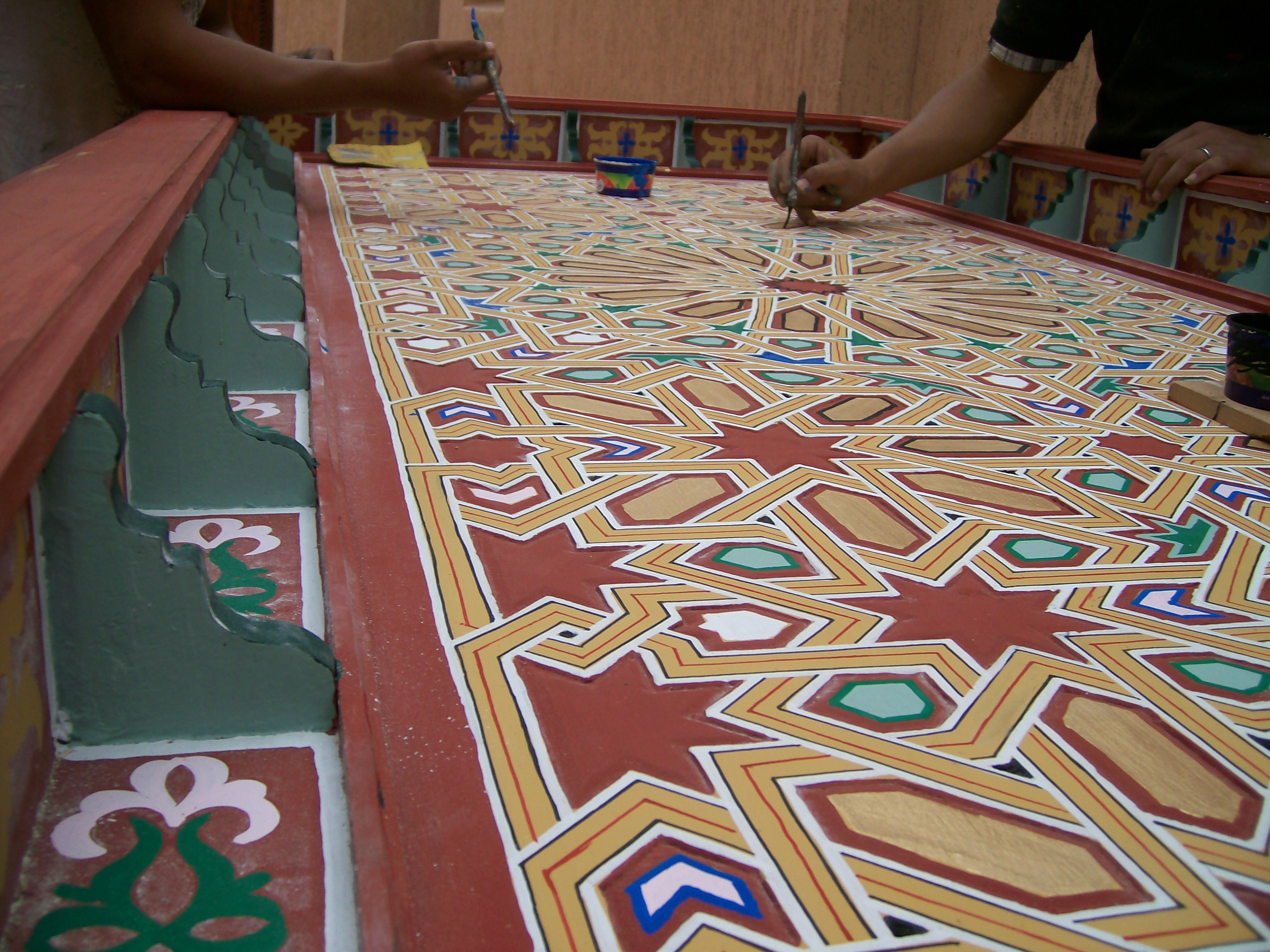
Painted Woodwork

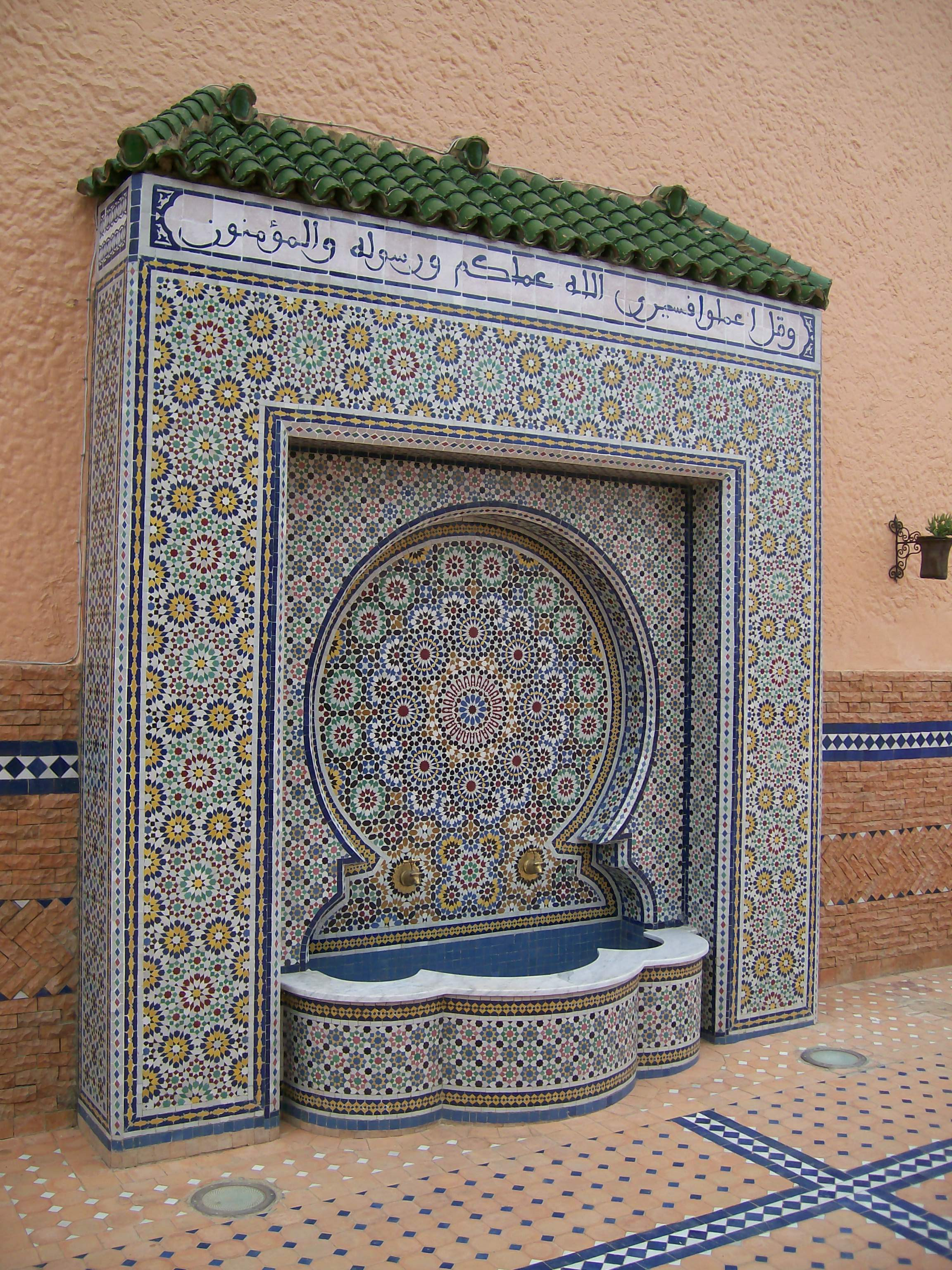
Traditional Moroccan Fountain

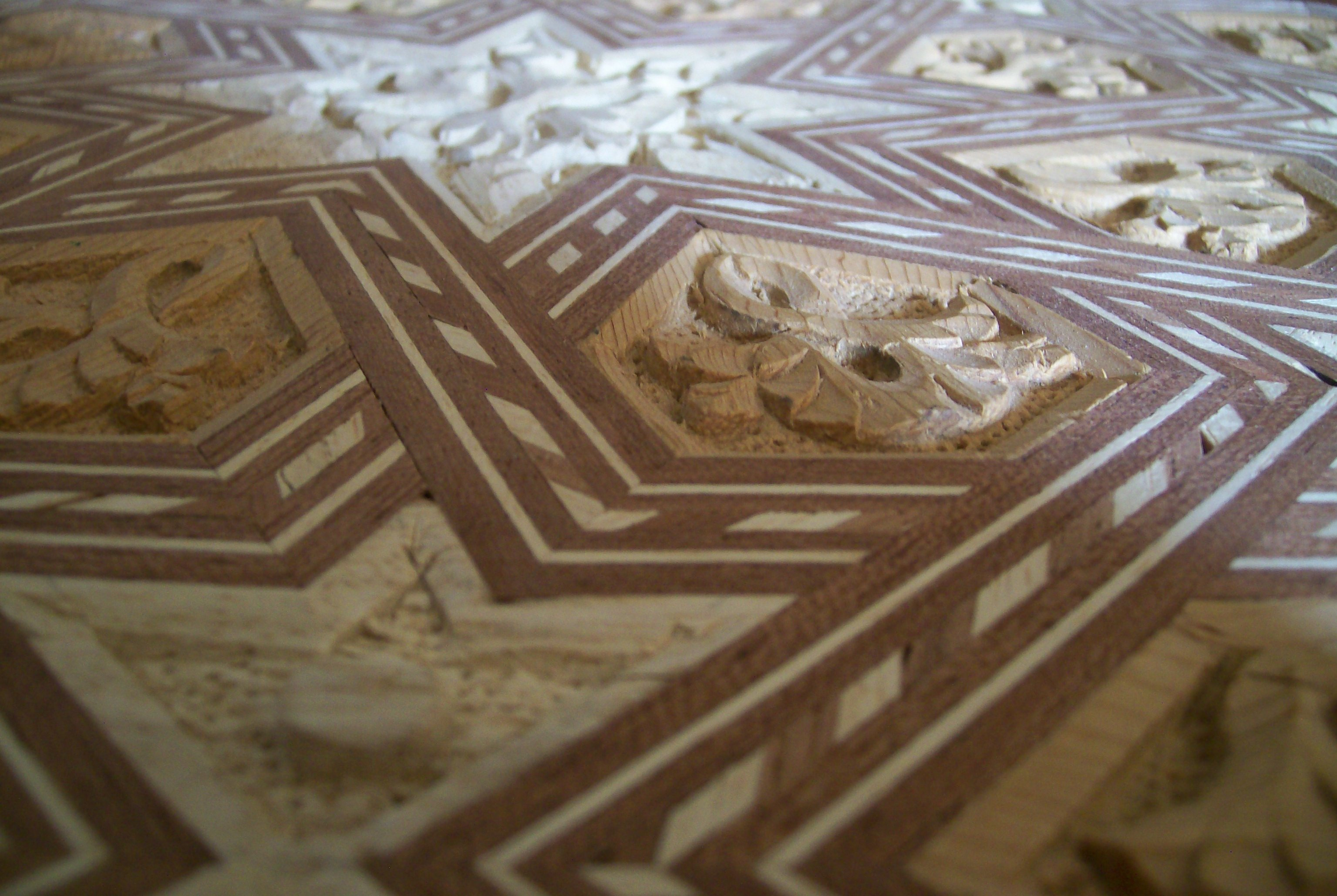
Detail of wood carving

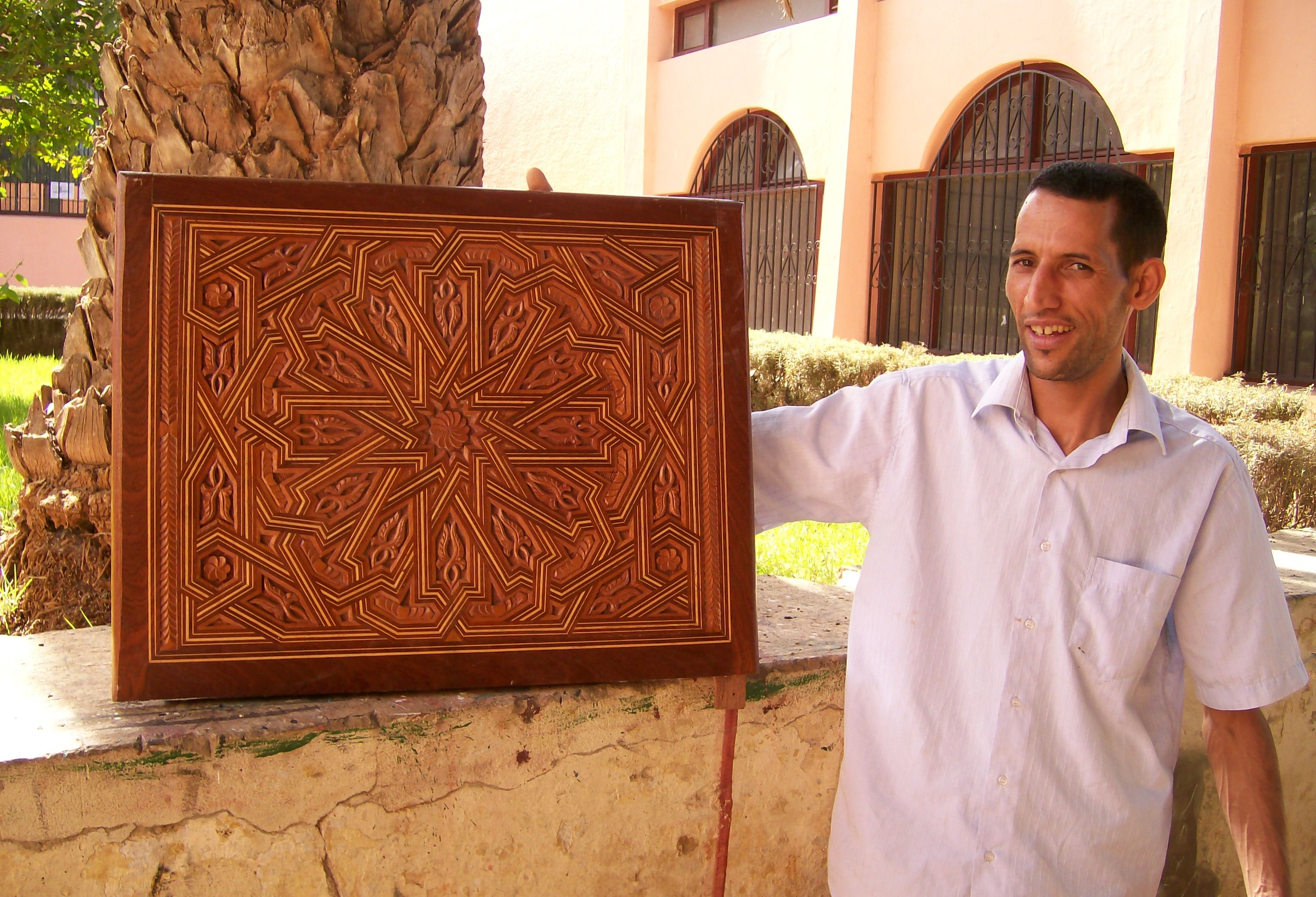
A carpenter at the Chamber with an example of his work
