= Jbel Tamarrakoit =

Volcano in Morocco

- Location within Morocco

Highest point
- Elevation: 2,345 m (7,694 ft)
- Coordinates: 33°03′44″N 5°03′55″W

Geography
- Location: Fès-Meknès, Morocco
- Parent range: Middle Atlas

Geology
- Rock age: Pleistocene
- Mountain type: Shield volcano

Jbel Tamarrakoit is an extinct shield volcano located 60 km south of the city of Ifrane in the Middle Atlas of Morocco. This mountain is one of the three main volcanic structures of the Azrou region along with Jbel El Koudiate and Jbel Outgui.

== See also ==
- Azrou volcanic field
