= Jbel El Koudiate =

Mountain in Morocco

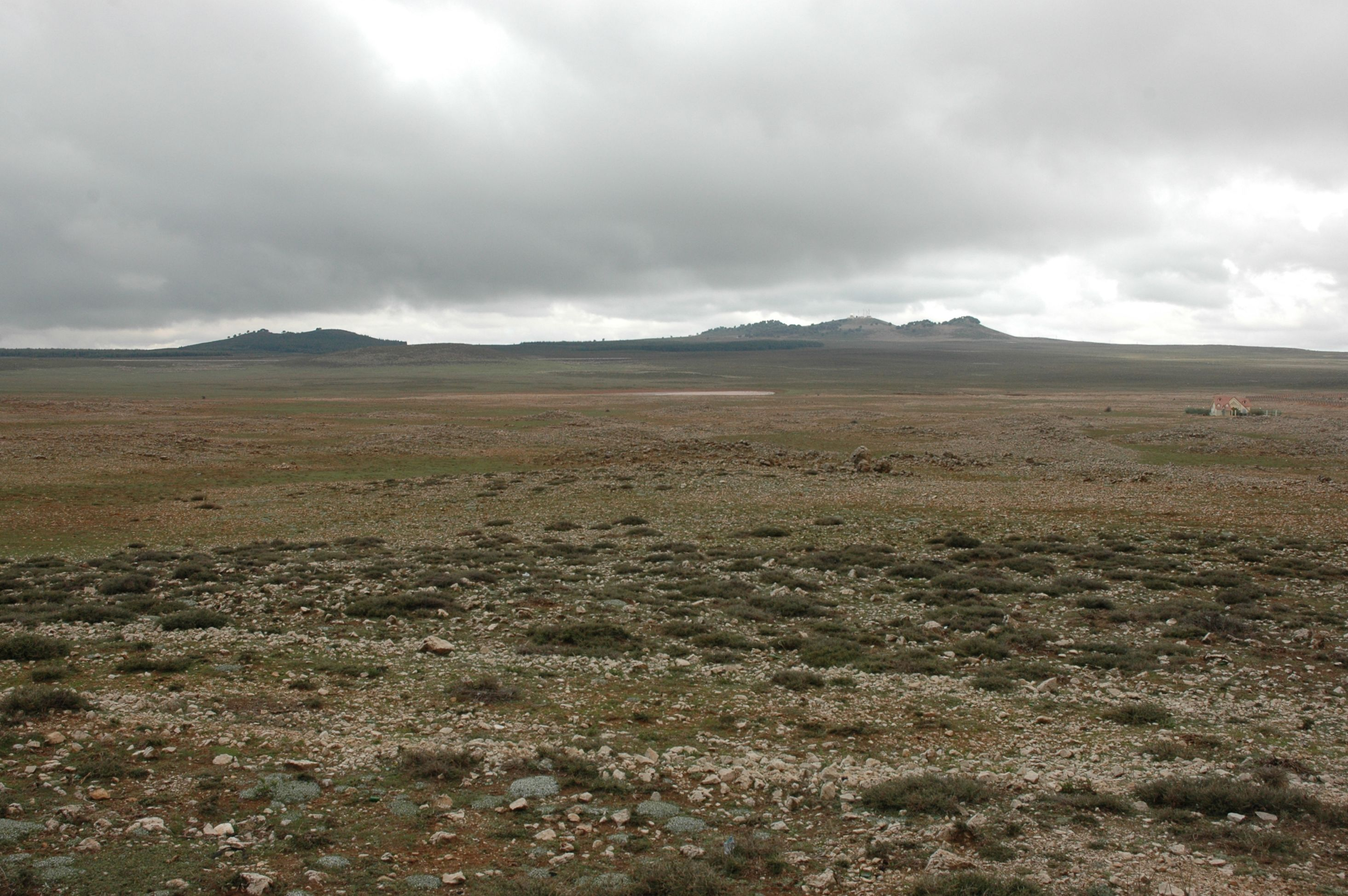
- jbel El Koudiate in the background right

Highest point
- Elevation: 1,780 m (5,840 ft)
- Coordinates: 33°31′52″N 5°09′23″W

Geography
- Location within Morocco
- Location: Fès-Meknès, Morocco
- Parent range: Middle Atlas

Geology
- Rock age: Pleistocene
- Mountain type: Shield volcano

Jbel El Koudiate is an extinct shield volcano located 5 km west of the city of Ifrane in the Middle Atlas of Morocco. It is one of the three main volcanic structures of the Azrou region with Jbel Outgui and Jbel Tamarrakoit.

== See also ==
- Azrou volcanic field
