= Brahim Zniber =

Moroccan businessman (1920 – 29 September 2016)

- Born: 1920; Salé, Morocco
- Died: 29 September 2016 (aged 95–96); Meknès, Morocco
- Occupation: Businessman
- Spouses: Touria Tazi; Rita Maria Zniber born Marie-Françoise Duchesne
- Children: Ahmed Saad Zniber; Mohamed Nabil Zniber; Taher Moncef Zniber; Leyth Zniber
- Parent(s): Taher Zniber (father); Oum Kalthoum Chemaou (mother)

Brahim Zniber (1920 – 29 September 2016) was a Moroccan businessman. Through Diana Holding, he was the founder and the owner of Celliers de Meknès, the largest wine producer in Morocco, and owned 85% of the country's wine production. From the 1970s onward, he expanded into fruit and poultry production, and Coca-Cola bottling plants.

== Early life ==
Brahim Zniber was born in 1920 in Salé, Morocco. He grew up in Sidi Kacem, then called Petit Jean under the French colonial regime. His father, Taher Zniber, was a cereal and wool merchant who was active in the Koutla political coalition. His mother was Oum Kalthoum Chemaou, he had five brothers and four sisters.

Zniber studied arboriculture and viticulture remotely, taking courses at the Ecole universitaire de Paris. While he was a student, he became a nationalist activist, serving under Mehdi Ben Barka. He hid in a remote location near Meknes to flee persecution.

== Career ==
Zniber began his career in wine-making in 1956, when he purchased 740 hectares in Ait Harz Allah. Meanwhile, he joined the board of directors of the regional chapter of the Crédit agricole du Maroc. By 1958, he founded the Union marocaine de l’agriculture, a trade organization for Moroccan agriculture.

Zniber was granted 1,100 hectares by King Mohammed V in 1958, mainly landholdings that were restituted from French colonists in the wake of Morocco's independence. By 1964, he founded Samavin, later known as Celliers de Meknès. He was responsible for the growth of the wine industry in the Meknès Prefecture and Benslimane Province from the 1960s onwards.

Zniber served as a member of the House of Representatives in the 1970s. Meanwhile, he began to grow citrus fruits, apples, apricots, pears, almonds and pistachios. He acquired a poultry factory in 1975. Six years later, in 1981, he acquired Ebertec, a wine production and distribution company with two subsidiaries, Thalvin and MR. Renouvo. Additionally, he invested in two bottling plants for Coca-Cola, one in Tangier and the other one in Oujda. He founded Diana Holding in 1986. In 2005, he established the first "appellation d'origine contrôlée" in Morocco, known as Les Coteaux de L’Atlas.

By 2014, Zniber was the owner of 2,000 hectares of vineyards near Meknes through Celliers de Meknès, and he sold 35 million bottles every year, making him the largest wine producer in Morocco. His flagship vineyard was Château Roslane. His holding company, Diana Holding, had a payroll of 8,000 and annual sales of US$3 billion. His investments included the production of olive oil under the brandname of CaracTerre and wine via Celliers de Meknès as well as "meat processing and commercial nurseries".

By 2016, Zniber owned 85% of Morocco's wine production, and 8,300 hectares. Diana Holding was the seventh largest privately owned company in Morocco. His main competitor was Groupe Castel.

== Personal life and death ==
Zniber was first married to Touria Tazi, with whom he had three children: Ahmed Saad, Mohamed Nabil and Taher Moncef. The couple divorced and he married a second time to Rita Maria Zniber, born Marie-Françoise Duchesne,(now CEO/Chairman of Diana Holding). They had children, among them Leyth Zniber, who founded Eiréné, an investment fund, in 2014.

Zniber died on 29 September 2016 in Meknès, Morocco at the age of 96. He received a Muslim funeral on 1 October and was buried in Meknès.
