= Jahjouh =

- Rural commune and town
- Interactive map of Jahjouh
- Coordinates: 33.7165°N 5.6728°W
- Country: Morocco
- Region: Fès-Meknès
- Province: El Hajeb Province

Population (2004)
  - Total: 7,689
- Time zone: UTC+0 (GMT)

Jahjouh is a small town and rural commune in El Hajeb Province of the Fès-Meknès region of Morocco. At the time of the 2004 census, the commune had a total population of 7689 people living in 1388 households.
