= Ait Yaazem =

Coordinates: 33°44′N 5°35′W

- Rural commune and town
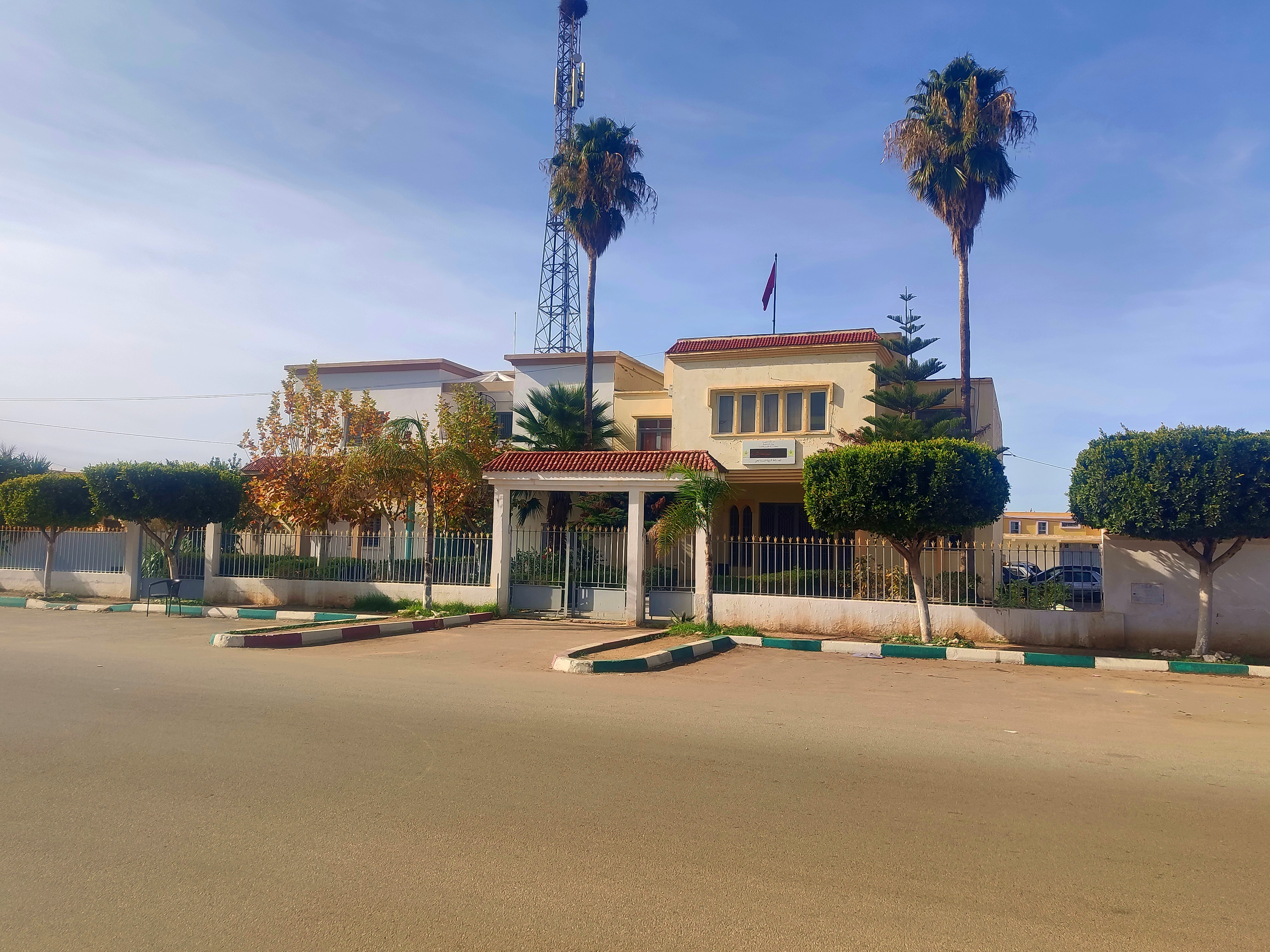
- Interactive map of Ait Yaazem
- Country: Morocco
- Region: Fès-Meknès
- Province: El Hajeb Province

Population (2004)
  - Total: 14,615
- Time zone: UTC+0 (GMT)

Ait Yaazem is a small town and rural commune in El Hajeb Province of the Fès-Meknès region of Morocco. At the time of the 2004 census, the commune had a total population of 14,615 people living in 2845 households.
