= Tamchachate =

- Rural commune and town
- Location within Morocco
- Coordinates: 33.5886°N 5.5896°W
- Country: Morocco
- Region: Fès-Meknès
- Province: El Hajeb Province

Population (2004)
  - Total: 4,151
- Time zone: UTC+0 (GMT)

Tamchachate is a small town and rural commune in El Hajeb Province of the Fès-Meknès region of Morocco. At the time of the 2004 census, the commune had a total population of 4151 people living in 648 households.
