= Ras Ijerri =

Coordinates: 33°47′N 5°43′W

- Rural commune and town
- Location within Morocco
- Country: Morocco
- Region: Fès-Meknès
- Province: El Hajeb Province

Population (2004)
  - Total: 6,119
- Time zone: UTC+0 (GMT)

Ras Ijerri is a small town and rural commune in El Hajeb Province of the Fès-Meknès region of Morocco. At the time of the 2004 census, the commune had a total population of 6119 people living in 1094 households.
