= Bitit =

- Rural commune and town
- Location within Morocco
- Coordinates: 33.8102°N 5.1249°W
- Country: Morocco
- Region: Fès-Meknès
- Province: El Hajeb Province

Population (2004)
  - Total: 10,552
- Time zone: UTC+0 (GMT)

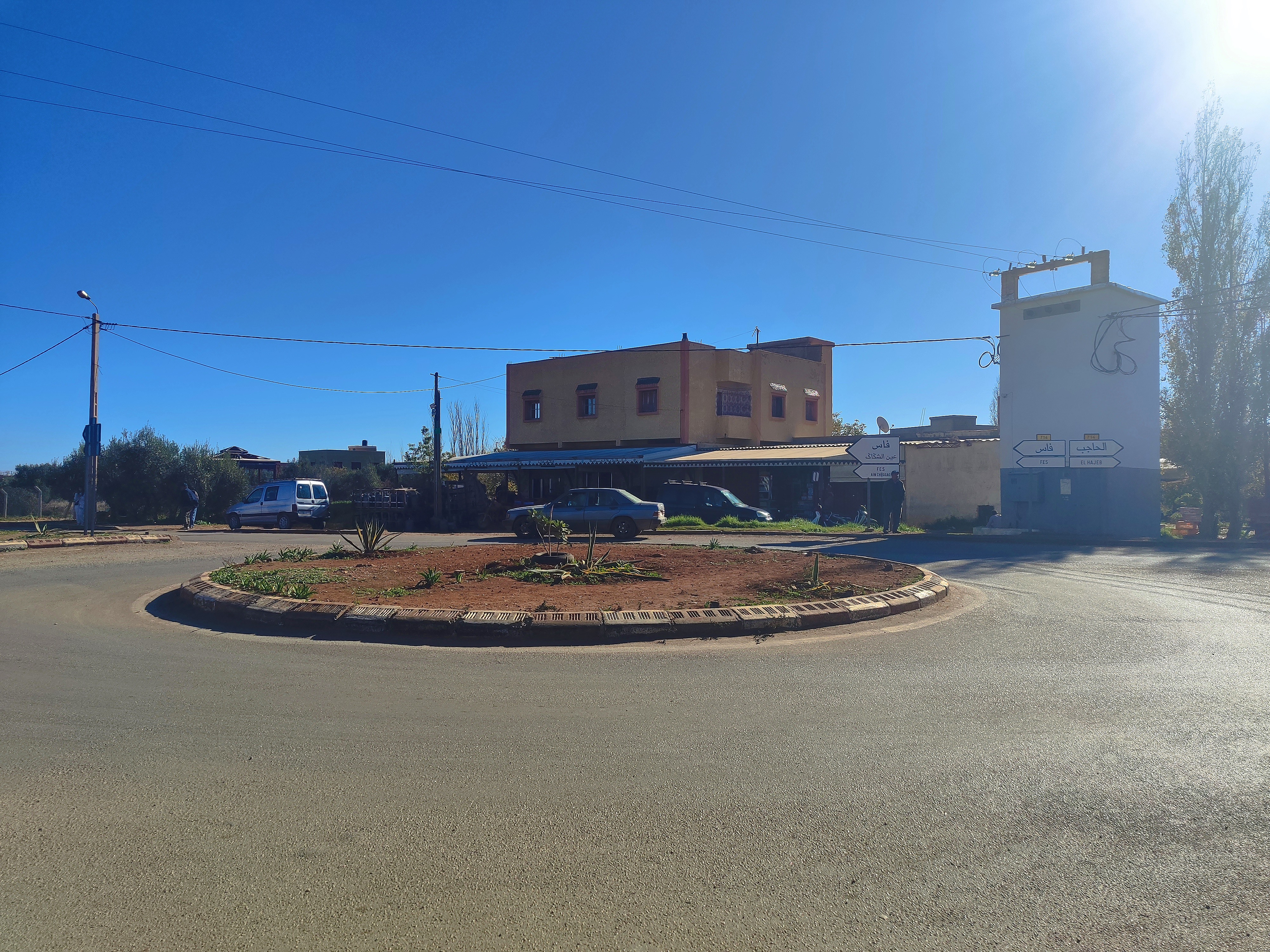
Bitit Community Center

Bitit is a small town and rural commune in El Hajeb Province of the Fès-Meknès region of Morocco. At the time of the 2004 census, the commune had a total population of 10552 people living in 1822 households.
