= Iqaddar =

- Rural commune and town
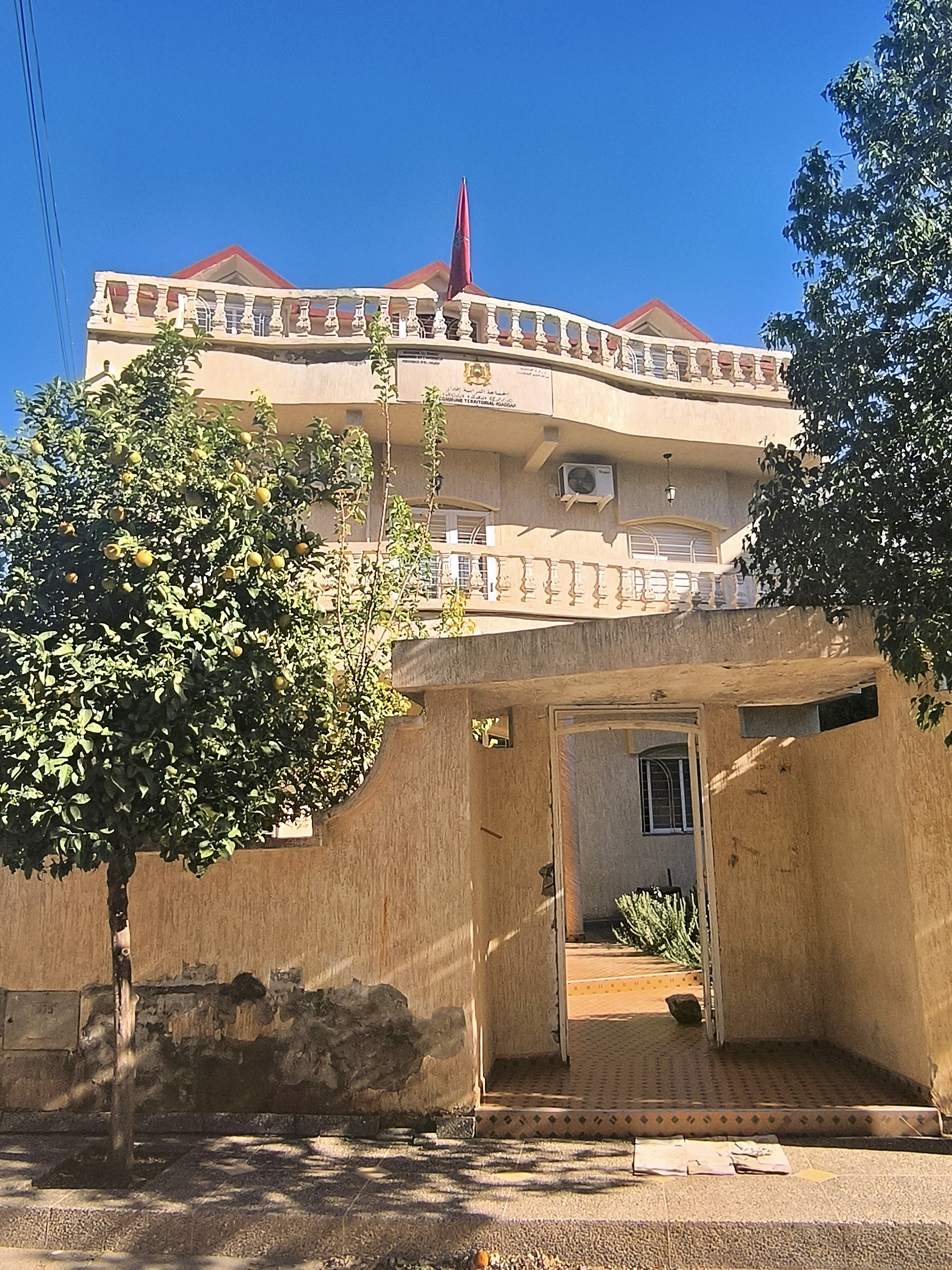
- Interactive map of Iqaddar
- Coordinates: 33.6661°N 5.4020°W
- Country: Morocco
- Region: Fès-Meknès
- Province: El Hajeb Province

Population (2004)
  - Total: 10,483
- Time zone: UTC+0 (GMT)

Iqaddar is a small town and rural commune in El Hajeb Province of the Fès-Meknès region of Morocco. At the time of the 2004 census, the commune had a total population of 10,483 people living in 1938 households.
