= Ain Taoujdate =

City in Fès-Meknès, Morocco

Ain Taoujdate عين تاوجطات ⵜⴰⵡⵊⵟⴰⵜ
- City
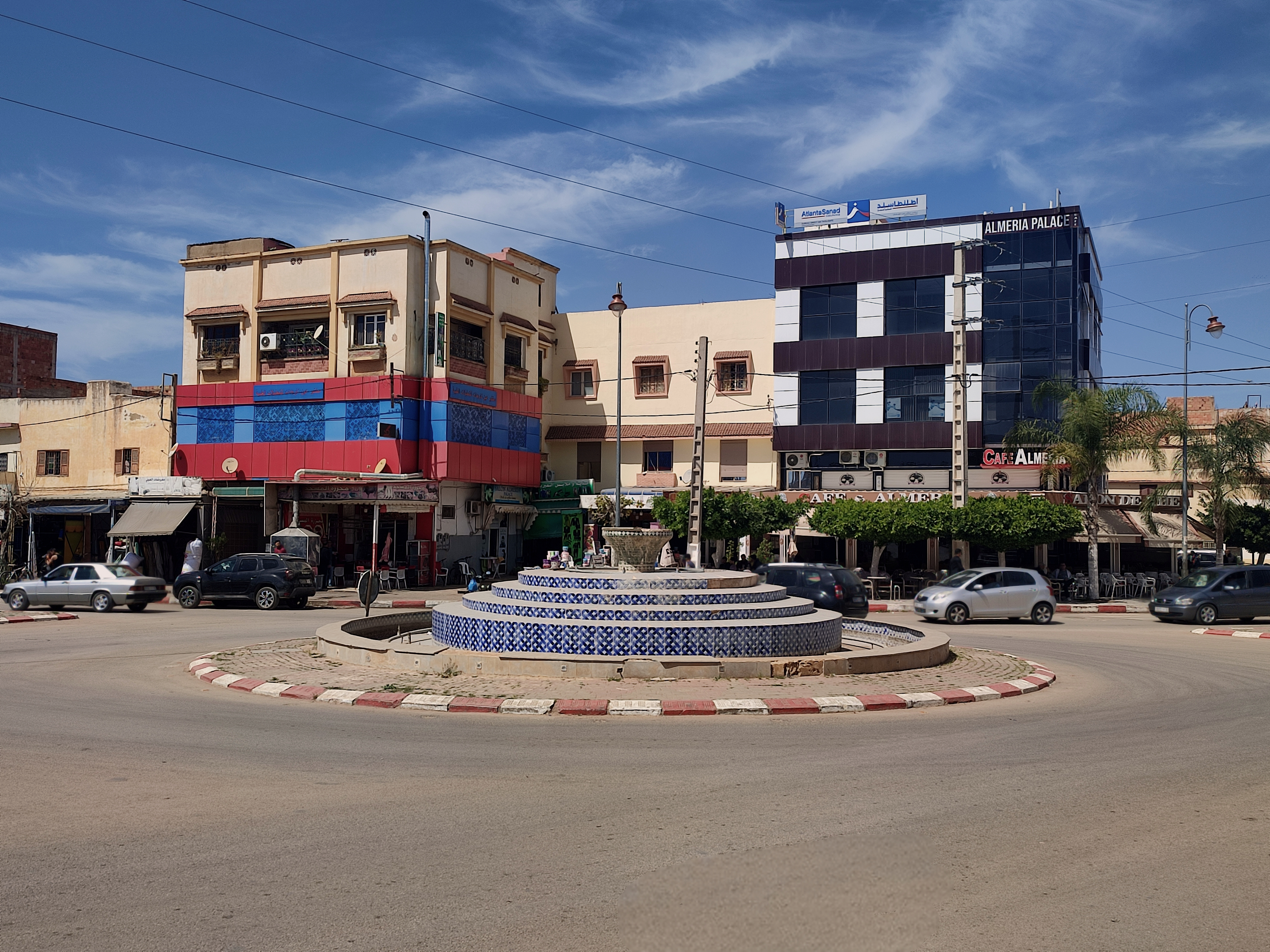
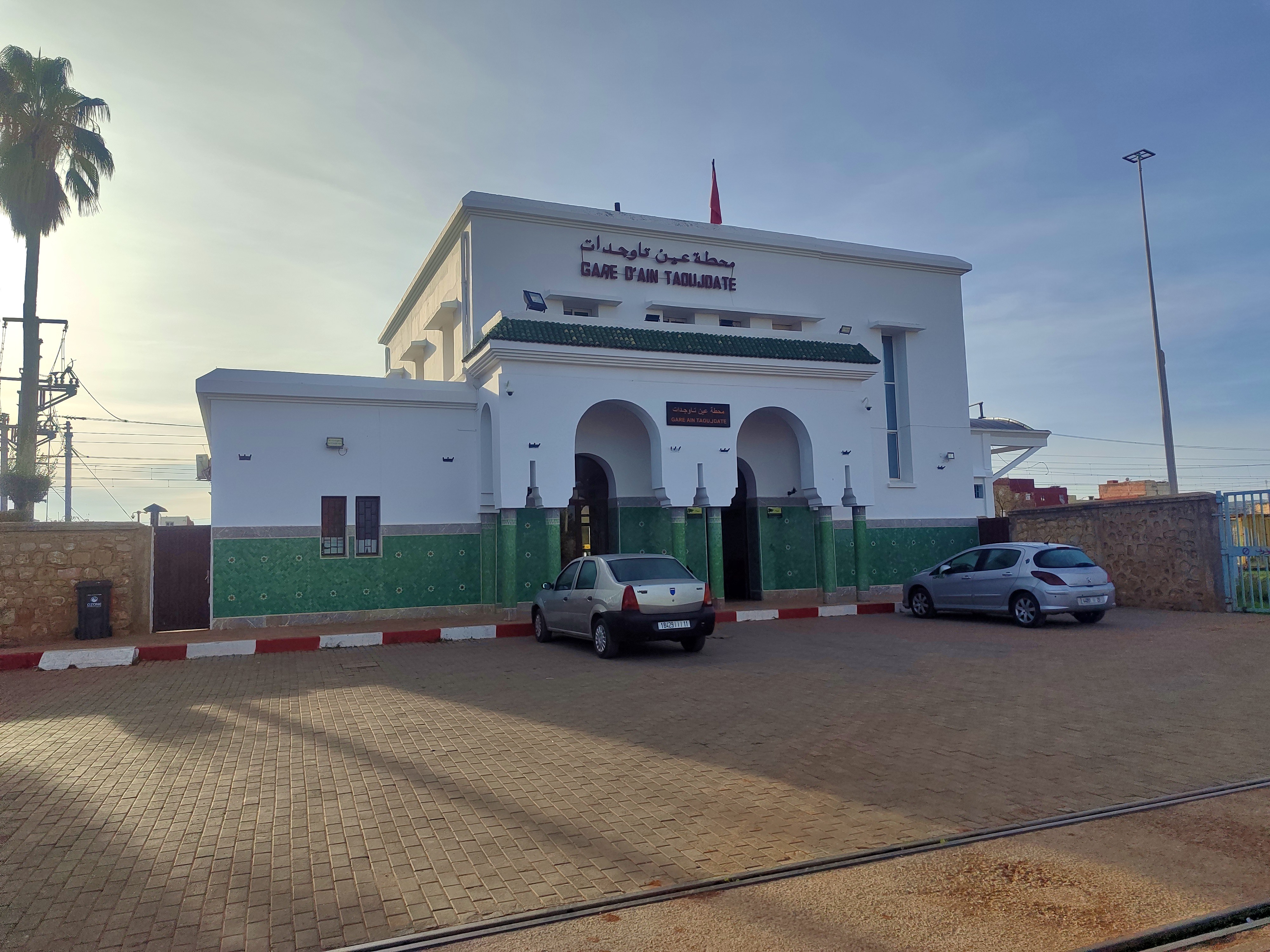
- Interactive map of Ain Taoujdate
- Coordinates: 33°56′N 5°13′W
- Country: Morocco
- Region: Fès-Meknès
- Province: El Hajeb Province
- Elevation: 1,637 ft (499 m)

Population (2024)
  - Total: 33,055
- Time zone: UTC+0 (GMT)

Ain Taoujdate (Arabic: عين تاوجطات, Standard Moroccan Tamazight: ⵜⴰⵡⵊⵟⴰⵜ) is a city in El Hajeb Province, Fès-Meknès, Morocco.

It is located roughly halfway between the cities of Fez and Meknes and is serviced by the national ONCF train line.

According to the 2024 census, it had a population of 33,055.
