= Sabaa Aiyoun =

Coordinates: 33°54′N 5°22′W

- Town
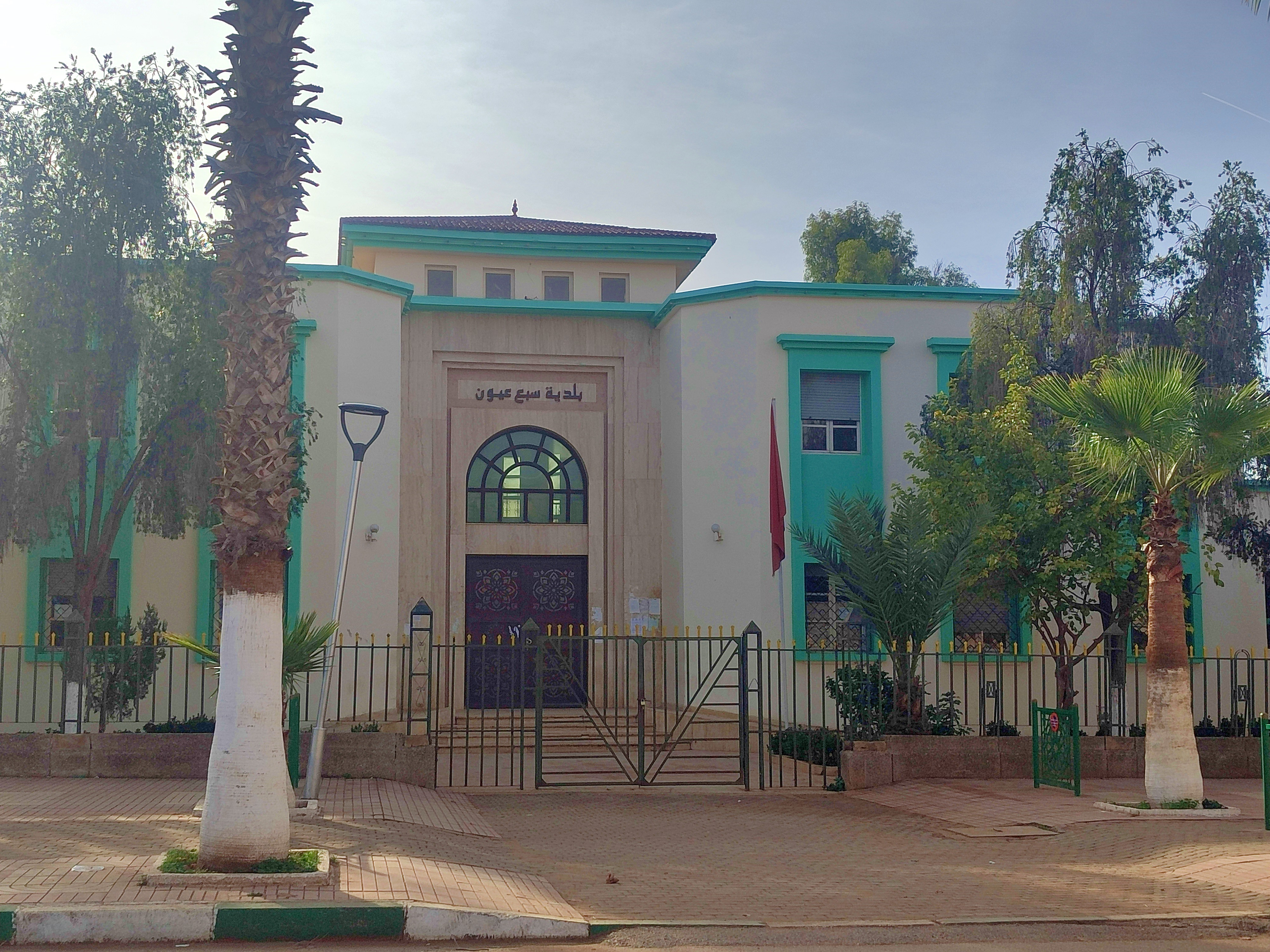
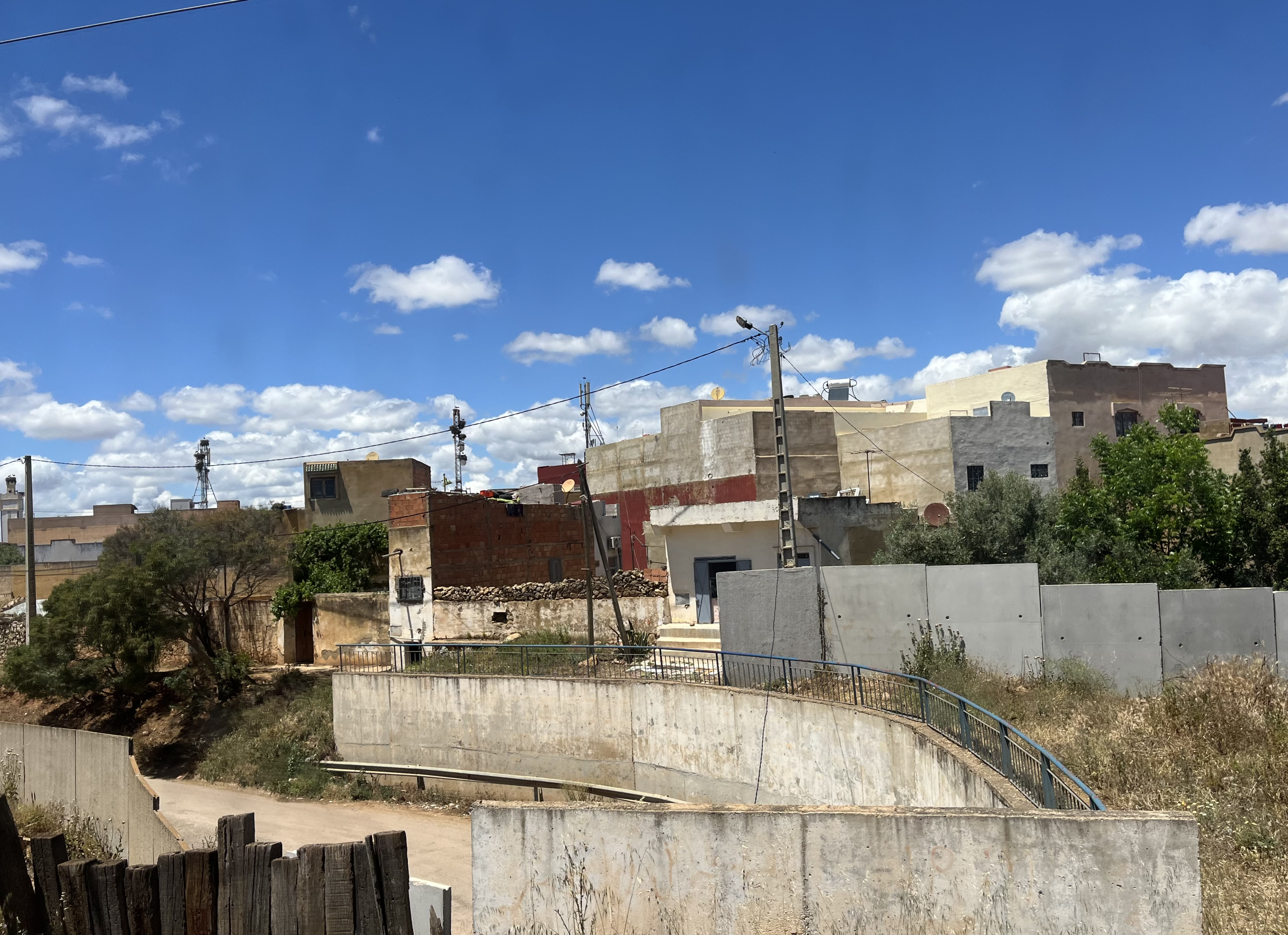
- Interactive map of Sabaa Aiyoun
- Country: Morocco
- Region: Fès-Meknès
- Province: El Hajeb Province

Population (2004)
  - Total: 21,513
- Time zone: UTC+0 (GMT)

Sabaa Aiyoun (Arabic: سبع عيون) is a town in El Hajeb Province, Fès-Meknès, Morocco. According to the 2004 census it has a population of 21,513.

== Location and climate ==
Sabaâ Aïyoun is located at an elevation of about 595 metres in the northwestern foothills of the Anti-Atlas in northern Morocco. It is about 45 km southeast of Fes and 25 km northeast of Meknes. The town has a generally warm and dry climate, with occasional periods of very hot weather in summer. Most of its annual precipitation, about 500–600 mm, falls during the winter months.
