= Ait Naamane =

- Rural commune and town
- Location within Morocco
- Coordinates: 33.7249°N 5.3388°W
- Country: Morocco
- Region: Fès-Meknès
- Province: El Hajeb Province

Population (2004)
  - Total: 6,375
- Time zone: UTC+0 (GMT)

Ait Naamane is a small town and rural commune in El Hajeb Province of the Fès-Meknès region of Morocco. At the time of the 2004 census, the commune had a total population of 6,375 people living in 1,060 households.
