= Ait Boubidmane =

- Town
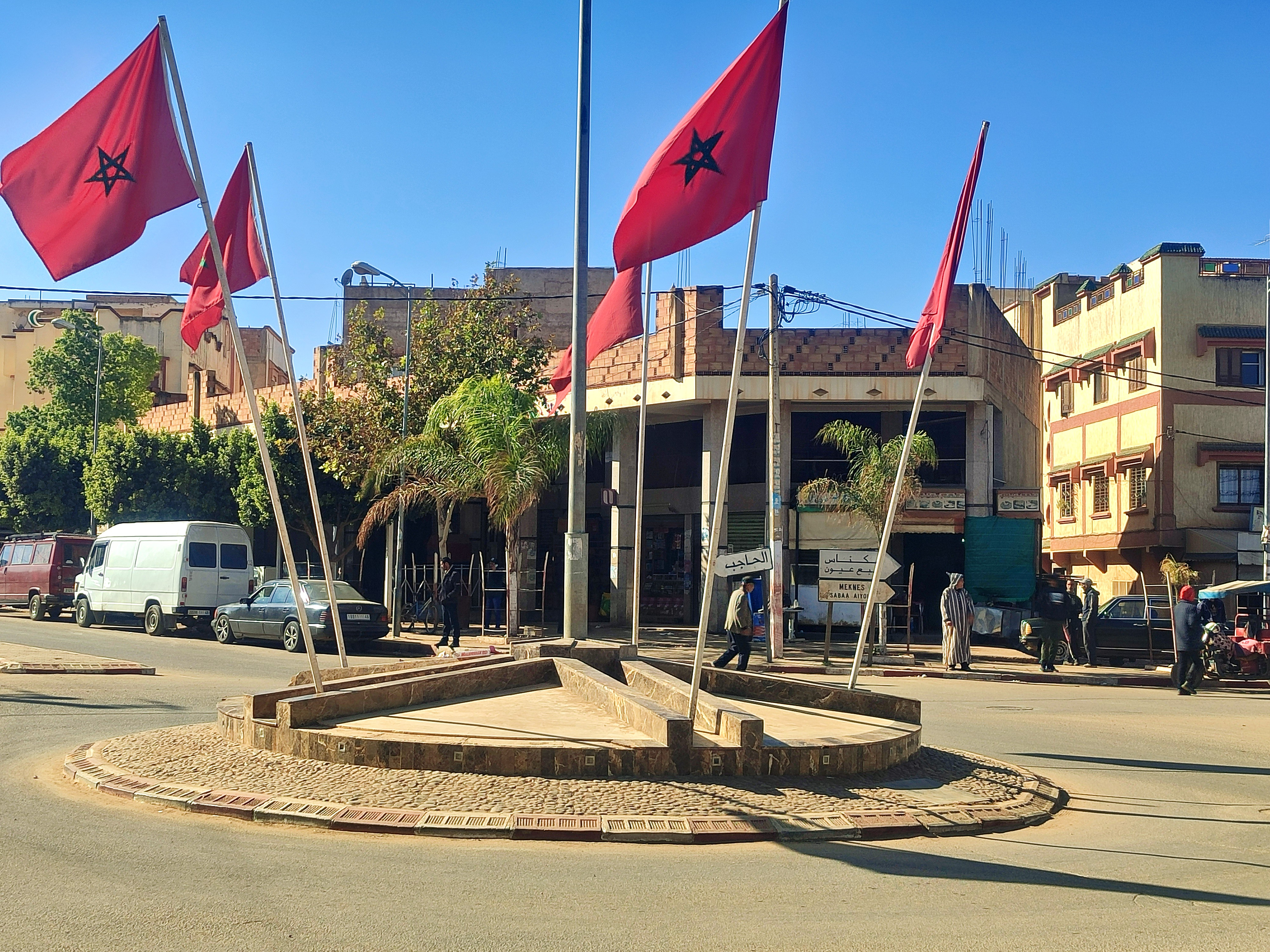
- Interactive map of Ait Boubidmane
- Coordinates: 33.8167°N 5.2749°W
- Country: Morocco
- Region: Fès-Meknès
- Province: El Hajeb Province

Population (2004)
  - Total: 4,258
- Time zone: UTC+0 (GMT)

Ait Boubidmane is a town in El Hajeb Province, Fès-Meknès, Morocco. According to the 2004 census it has a population of 4,258.
