= Ait Bourzouine =

Ait Bourzouine Beni hilal
- Rural commune and town
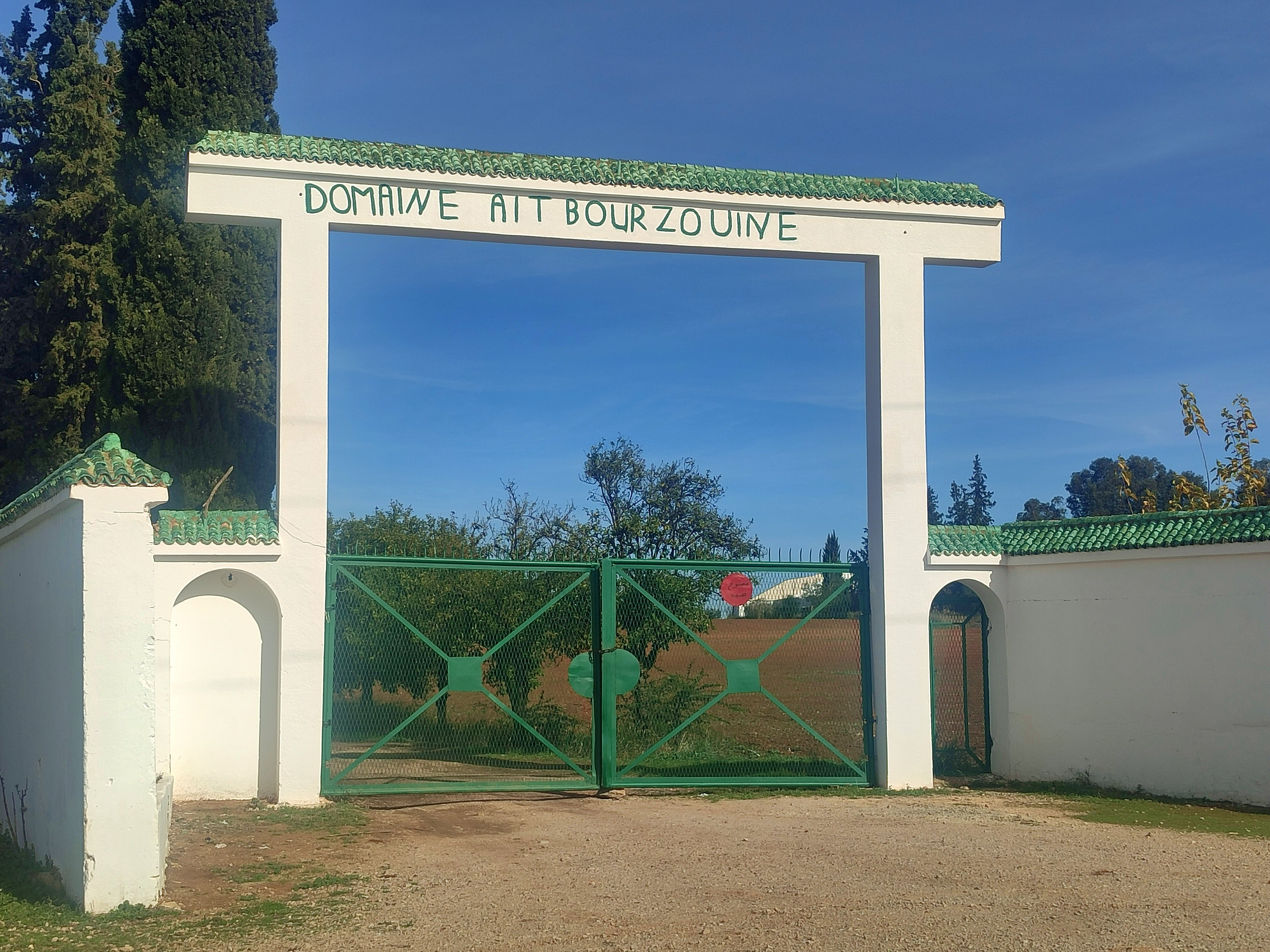
- Interactive map of Ait Bourzouine
- Coordinates: 33.6326°N 5.5169°W
- Country: Morocco
- Region: Fès-Meknès
- Province: El Hajeb Province

Population (2004)
  - Total: 8,635
- Time zone: UTC+0 (GMT)

Ait Bourzouine is a small town and rural commune in El Hajeb Province of the Fès-Meknès region of Morocco. At the time of the 2004 census, the commune had a total population of 8,635 people living in 1,530 households.
