= Ait Ouikhalfen =

- Rural commune and town
- Location within Morocco
- Coordinates: 33.7292°N 5.7284°W
- Country: Morocco
- Region: Fès-Meknès
- Province: El Hajeb Province

Population (2004)
  - Total: 4,303
- Time zone: UTC+0 (GMT)

Ait Ouikhalfen is a small town and rural commune in El Hajeb Province of the Fès-Meknès region of Morocco. At the time of the 2004 census, the commune had a total population of 4,303 people living in 627 households.
