= El Hajeb Province =

Coordinates: 33°41′45″N 5°22′00″W

El Hajeb Province إقليم الحاجب ⵜⴰⵙⴳⴰ ⵏ ⵍⵃⴰⵊⴱ
- Province
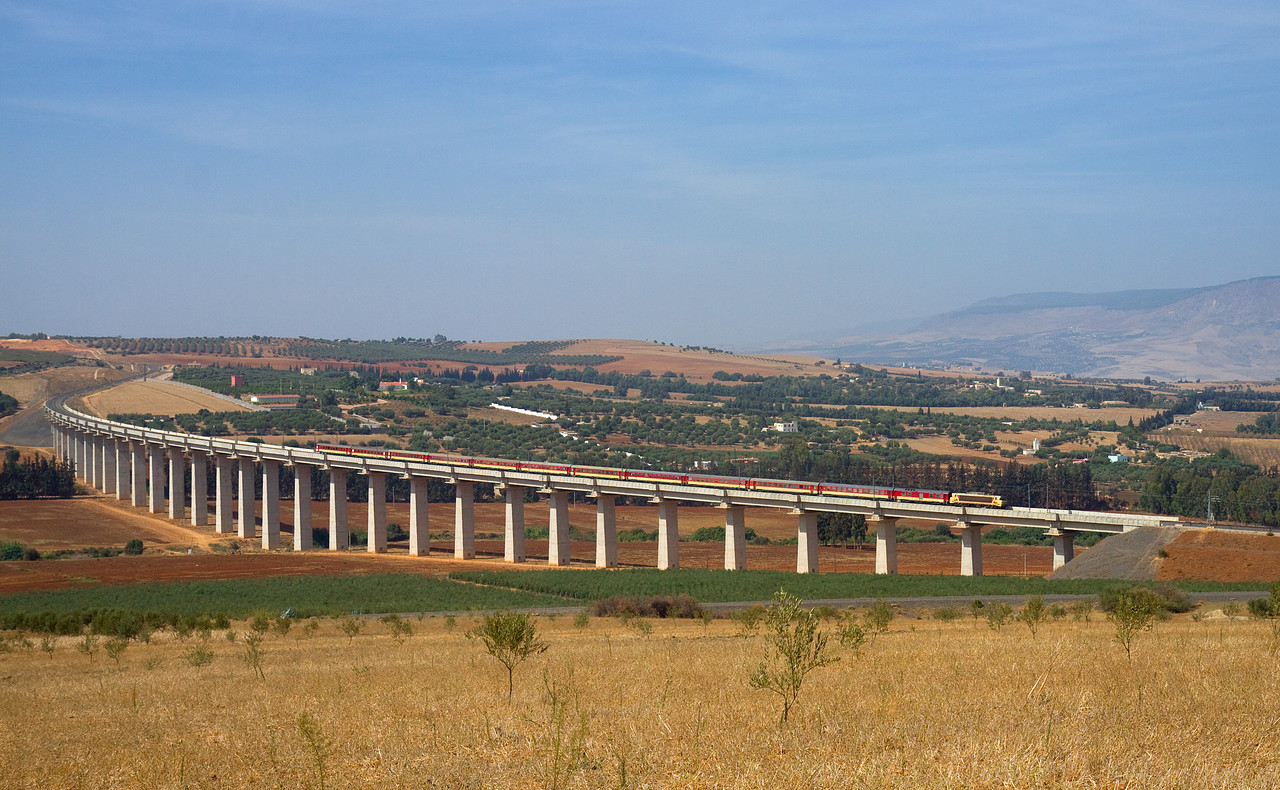
- Interactive map of El Hajeb Province
- Country: Morocco
- Region: Fès-Meknès
- Seat: El Hajeb

Area
  - Total: 2,193.41 km^{2} (846.88 sq mi)

Population (2024)
  - Total: 267,156

El Hajeb Province is a predominantly rural administrative subdivision of Morocco, located in the Fès-Meknès region. Its capital is the town of El Hajeb.

== Geography ==
El Hajeb Province covers an area of 2,193.41 square kilometres (846.88 sq mi). It is situated between the Saïss plain and the foothills of the Middle Atlas, giving it a varied landscape combining agricultural plains and elevated terrain.

== History ==
El Hajeb Province was created on 1 January 1991 by royal decree No. 2.91.90. Before the 2015 territorial reform, it was part of the former Meknès-Tafilalet region. It is now included in the Fès-Meknès region.

== Demographics ==
As of the 2024 census, El Hajeb Province had a population of 267,156 inhabitants, distributed across 66,258 households, including 58 foreign residents. The population is largely rural, with a relatively small proportion living in urban areas.

== Economy ==
The local economy is mainly based on agriculture, including cereal production, fruit growing, and livestock farming. Its location between the Saïss plain and the Middle Atlas supports diversified agricultural activity; while Commercial and service activities are concentrated in the main towns.

== Administrative divisions ==
Communes of El Hajeb Province

El Hajeb Province includes 4 municipalities and 12 rural communes:

=== Municipalities ===
Name	Geographic code	Households (2024)	Population (2024)
Agourai	171.01.01.	4819	19158
Ain Taoujdate	171.01.03.	8342	33055
El Hajeb	171.01.05.	11069	41359
Sabaa Aiyoun	171.01.07.	6926	28736

=== Rural communes ===
Name	Geographic code	Households (2024)	Population (2024)	Notes
Ait Boubidmane	171.05.01.	5674	22780	Urban centre: Bouderbala (10,418 inhabitants; 2,766 households)
Ait Bourzouine	171.07.01.	1785	7906	
Ait Harz Allah	171.05.03.	3260	13604	
Ait Naamane	171.07.03.	1348	5857	
Ait Ouikhalfen	171.03.01.	856	3261	
Ait Yaazem	171.03.03.	4239	16912	Urban centre: Kantina (5,033 inhabitants; 1,213 households)
Bitit	171.05.05.	3664	15241	
Iqaddar	171.07.05.	2127	8774	
Jahjouh	171.03.05.	1967	7867	Urban centre: Sebt Jahjouh (4,276 inhabitants; 1,131 households)
Laqsir	171.05.07.	7632	32377	
Ras Ijerri	171.03.07.	1744	6707	
Tamchachate	171.03.09.	806	3562	

== Sources ==
- Monographie de la province d'El Hajeb (pdf), province d'El Hajeb
