= Ait Harz Allah =

- Rural commune and town
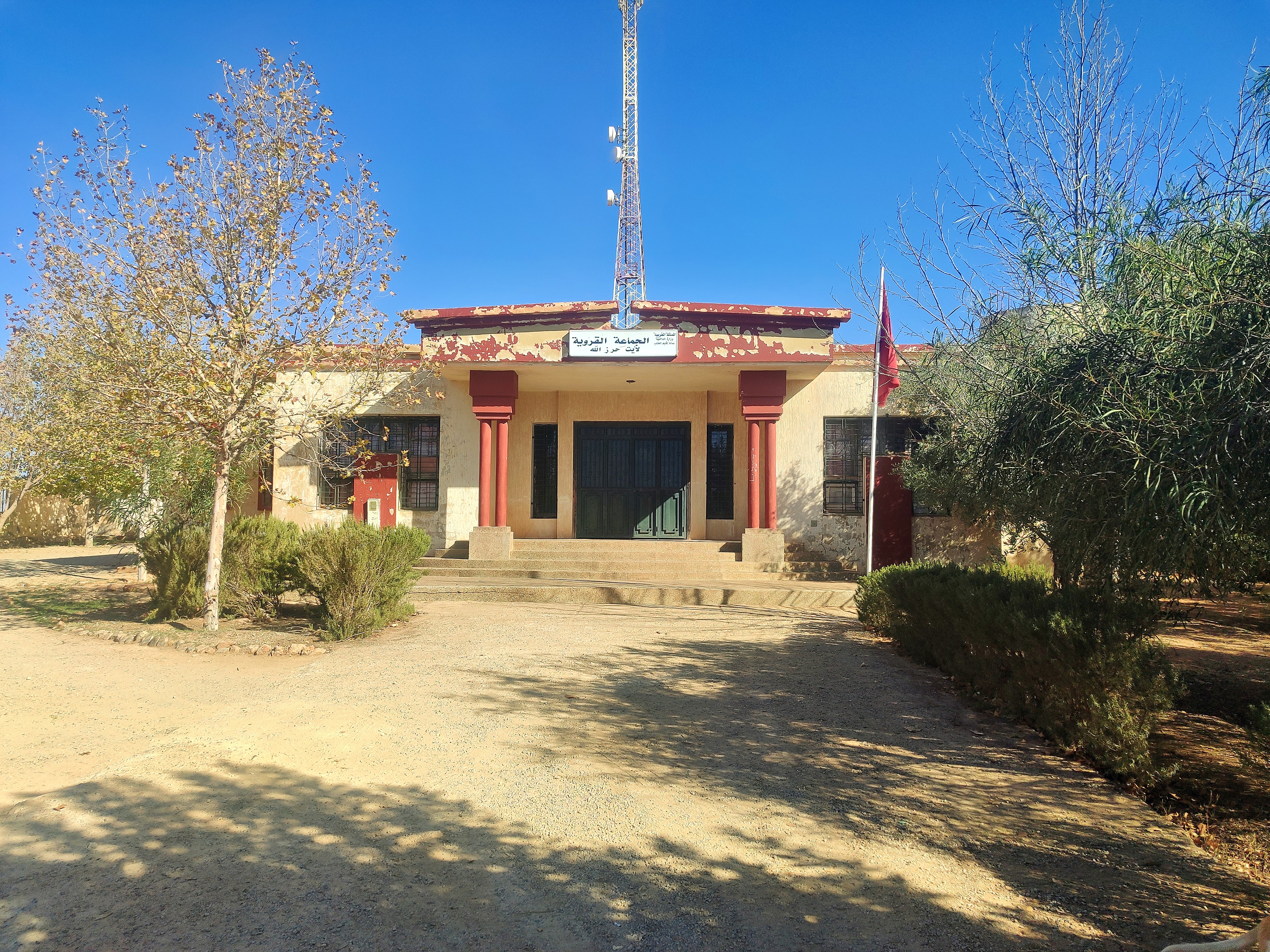
- Interactive map of Ait Harz Allah
- Coordinates: 33.7621°N 5.3349°W
- Country: Morocco
- Region: Fès-Meknès
- Province: El Hajeb Province

Population (2004)
  - Total: 13,310
- Time zone: UTC+0 (GMT)

Ait Harz Allah is a small town and rural commune in El Hajeb Province of the Fès-Meknès region of Morocco. At the time of the 2004 census, the commune had a total population of 13,310 people living in 2299 households.
