= Abdelali Bouazzaoui =

Moroccan runner and trainer (born 1991)

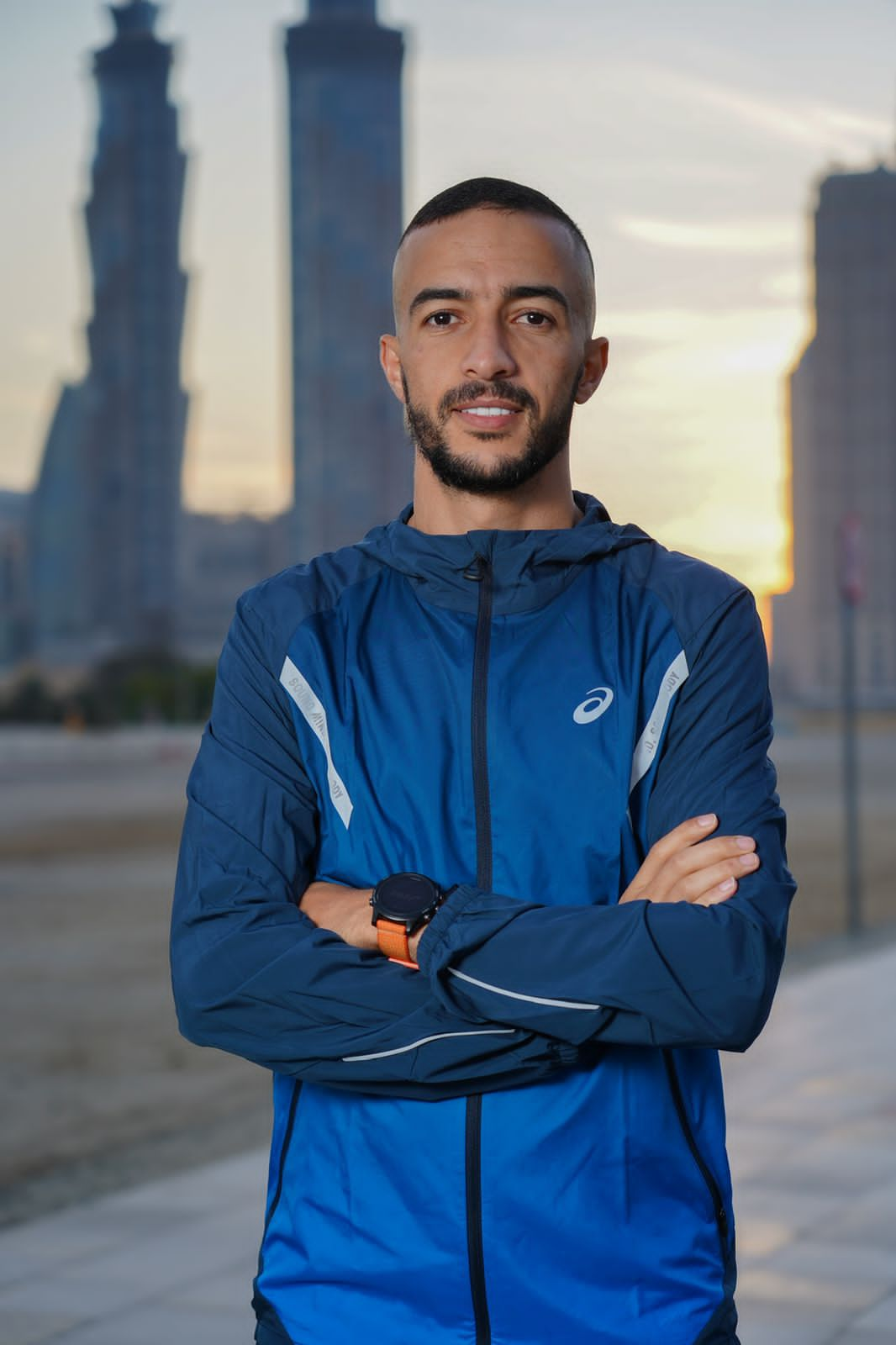
Abdelali Bouazzaoui: Born / 13 May 1991El hajeb; Nationality / Moroccan; Occupation / Runner and Trainer; Years active / 2006

Abdelali Bouazzaoui (Arabic : عبد العالي بوعزاوي, born 13 May 1991) is a Moroccan runner and trainer. He topped the charts in the Men's Pocari Sweat 10 km run in 2020.

== Early career ==
Born in El Hajeb, Bouazzaoui started out in Taikwando in 1997 at the age of 6, and then moved to Basketball in 2006, only to find out later that his true passion is running. He got his first bronze medal, when he participated in his university competition. In 2008, Bouazzaoui decided to become a professional runner and joined a local club named اشبال الإسماعيلية in Meknes.

== Competitions ==
Bouazzaoui won many national and local competitions in his home country Morocco. He took part in many races abroad, and most of them were in the UAE. In 2019, Bouazzaoui competed in NAS Sports Tournament 10-km run and was second to cross the line . In 2020, Bouazzaoui competed in the Pocari Sweat 10 km Run, which was held in Dubai at that time, and got his first gold medal.

Bouazzaoui participated in the same year in the Abu Dhabi Sports Council's Community Race, and along with a fellow Moroccan runner filled the top two spots in the 10-kilometre run.

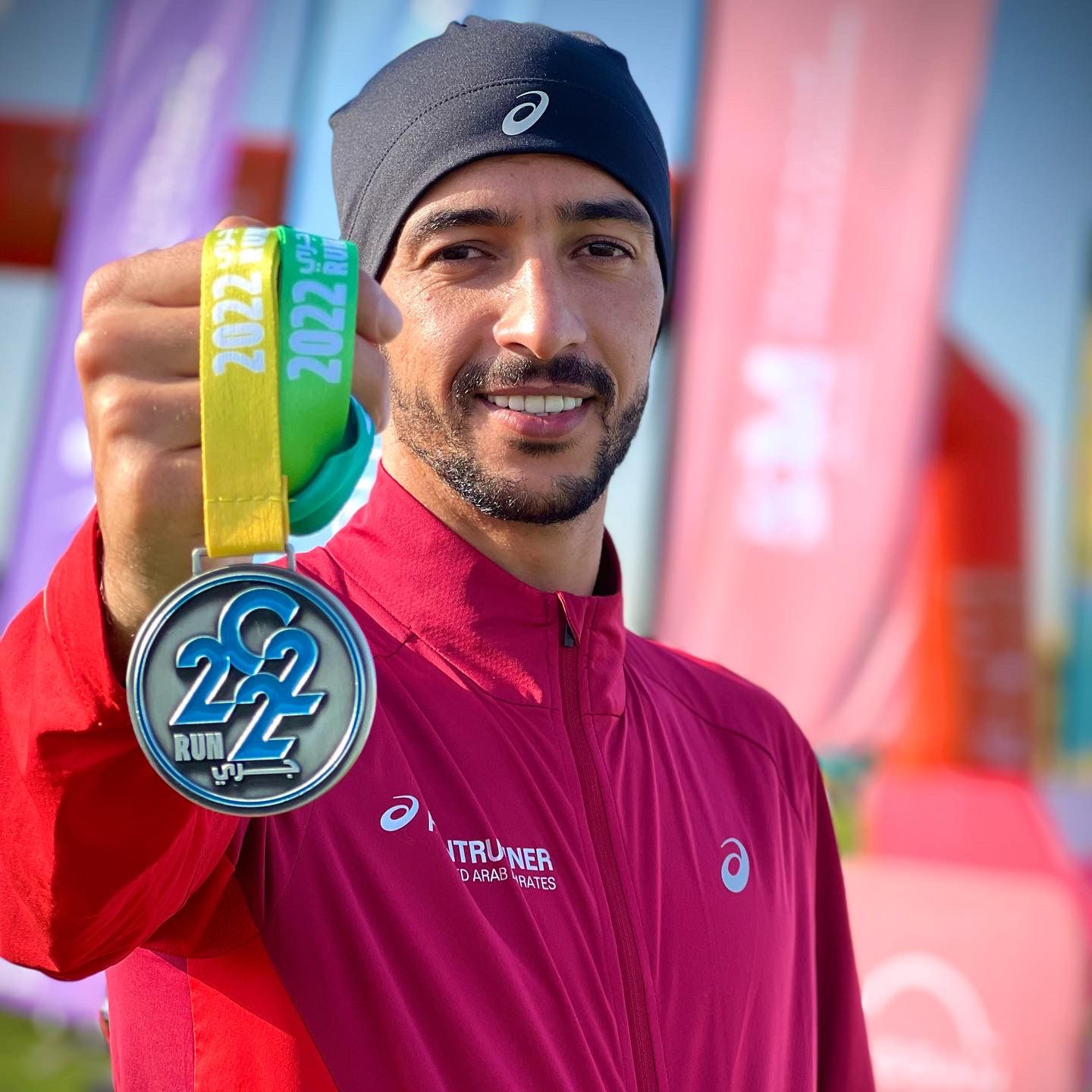
Abdelali Bouazzaoui 2022

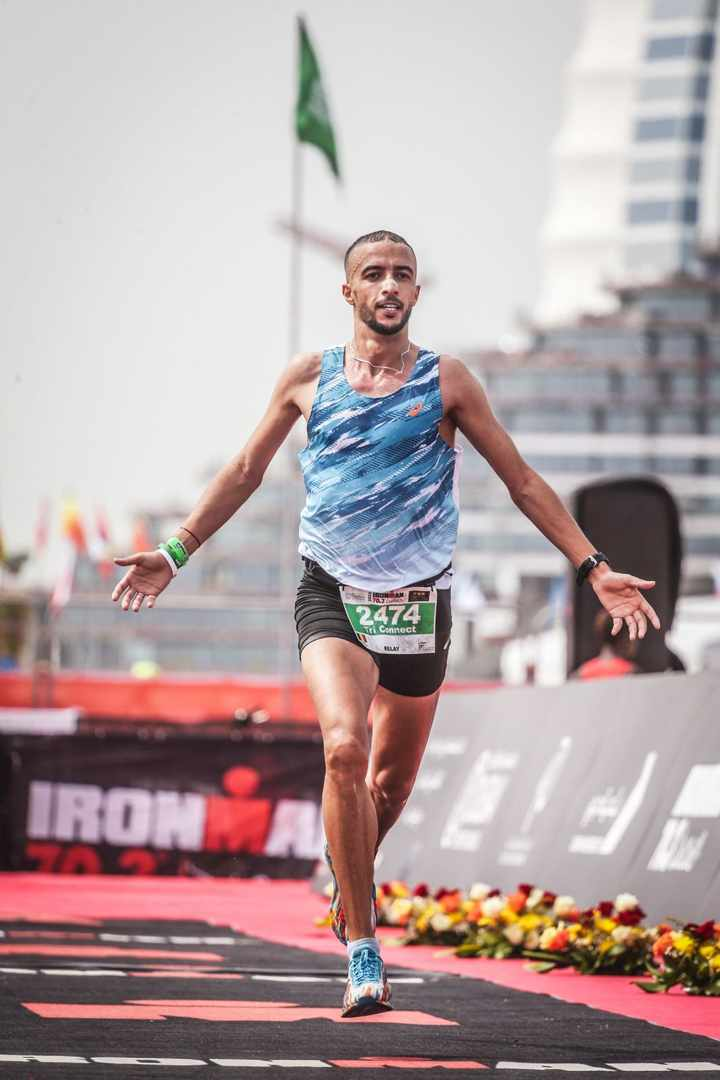
Abdelali Bouazzaoui competitions

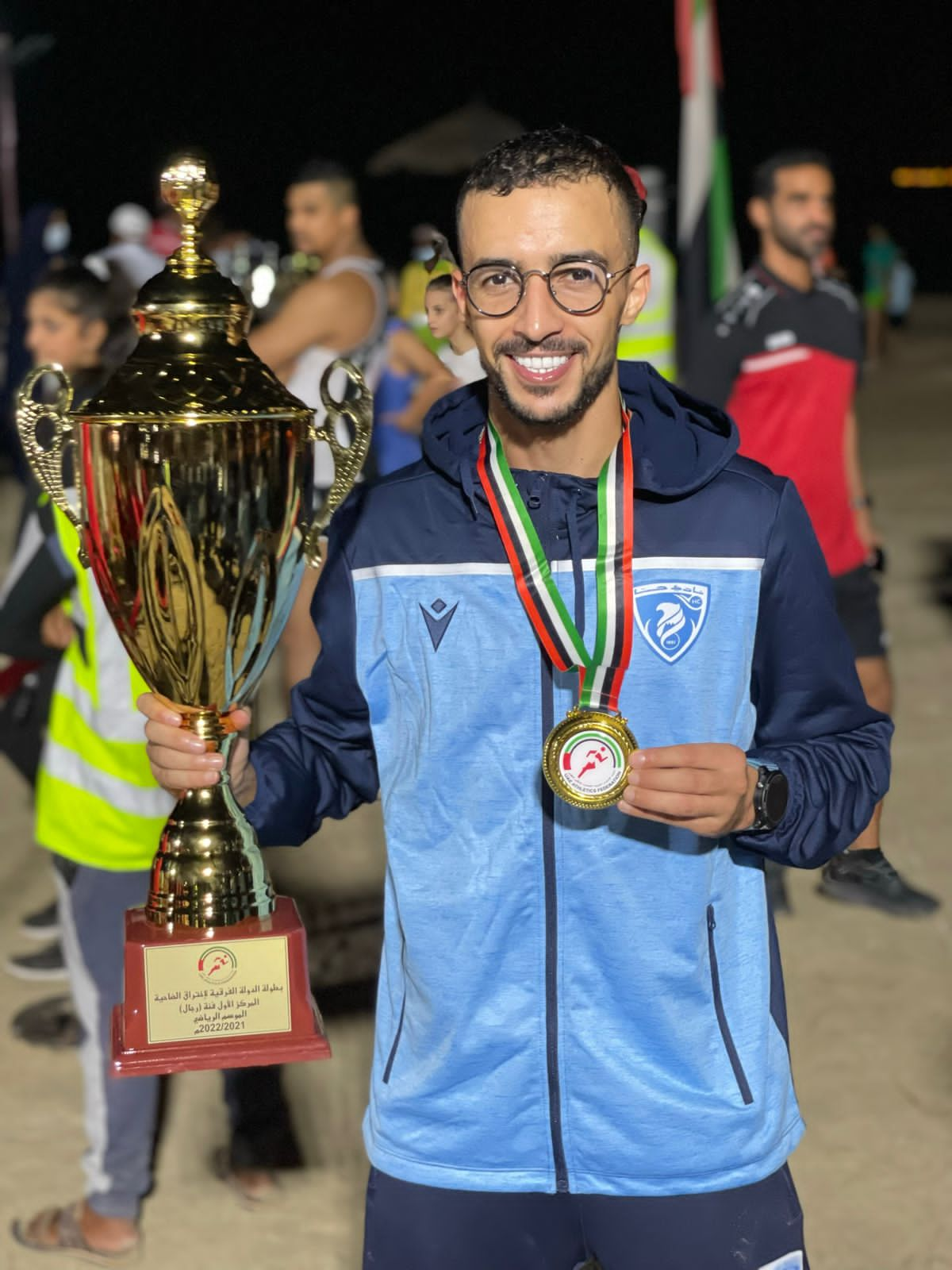
Abdelali Bouazzaoui dubai

== Personal life ==
At the moment, Bouazzaoui resides in the United Arab Emirates, and works as a personal trainer to many Emirati athletes. He has been working as a trainer in the UAE Armed Forces since 2014, and an ambassador for the brand Asics since 2020.
