= El Hajeb =

El Hajeb الحاجب
- City
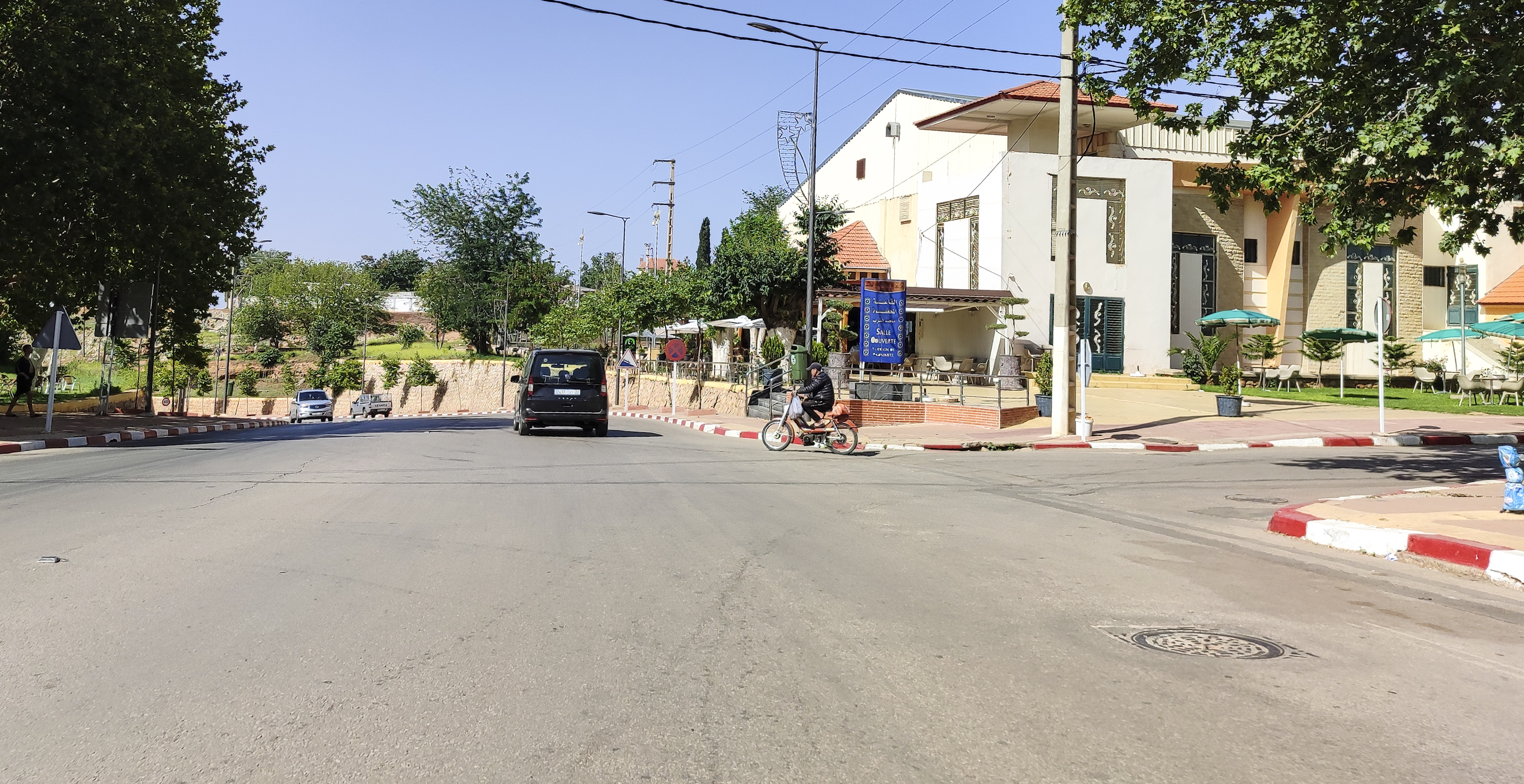
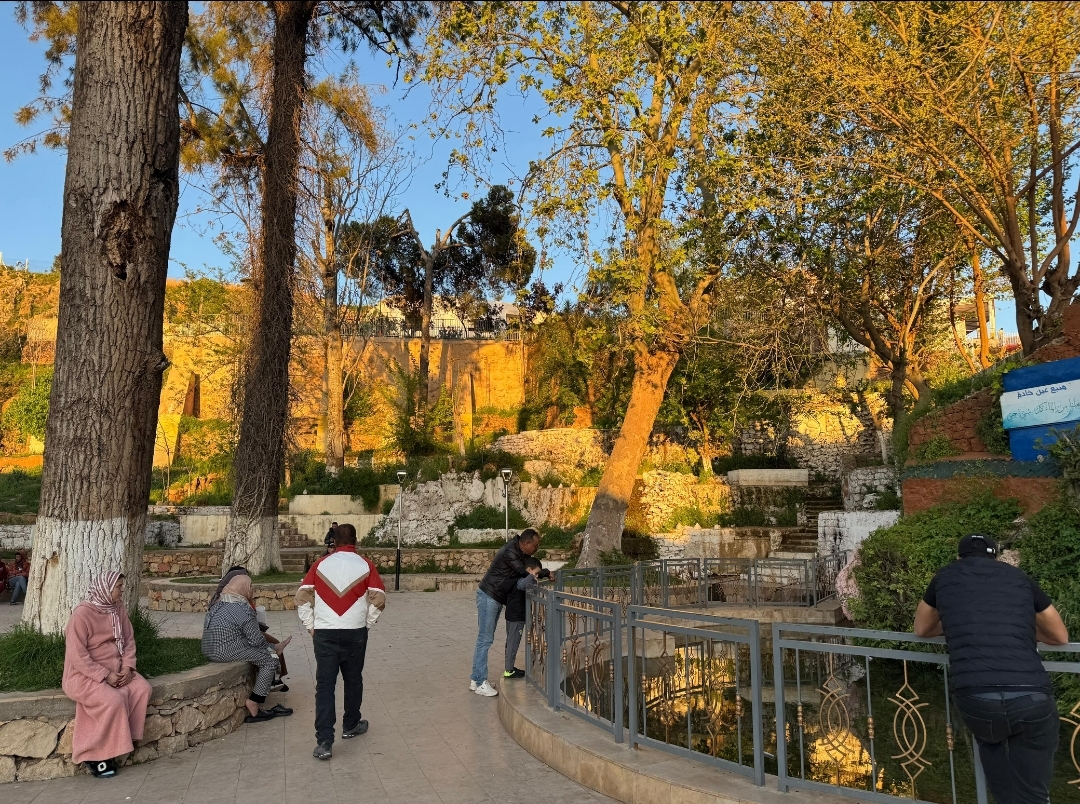
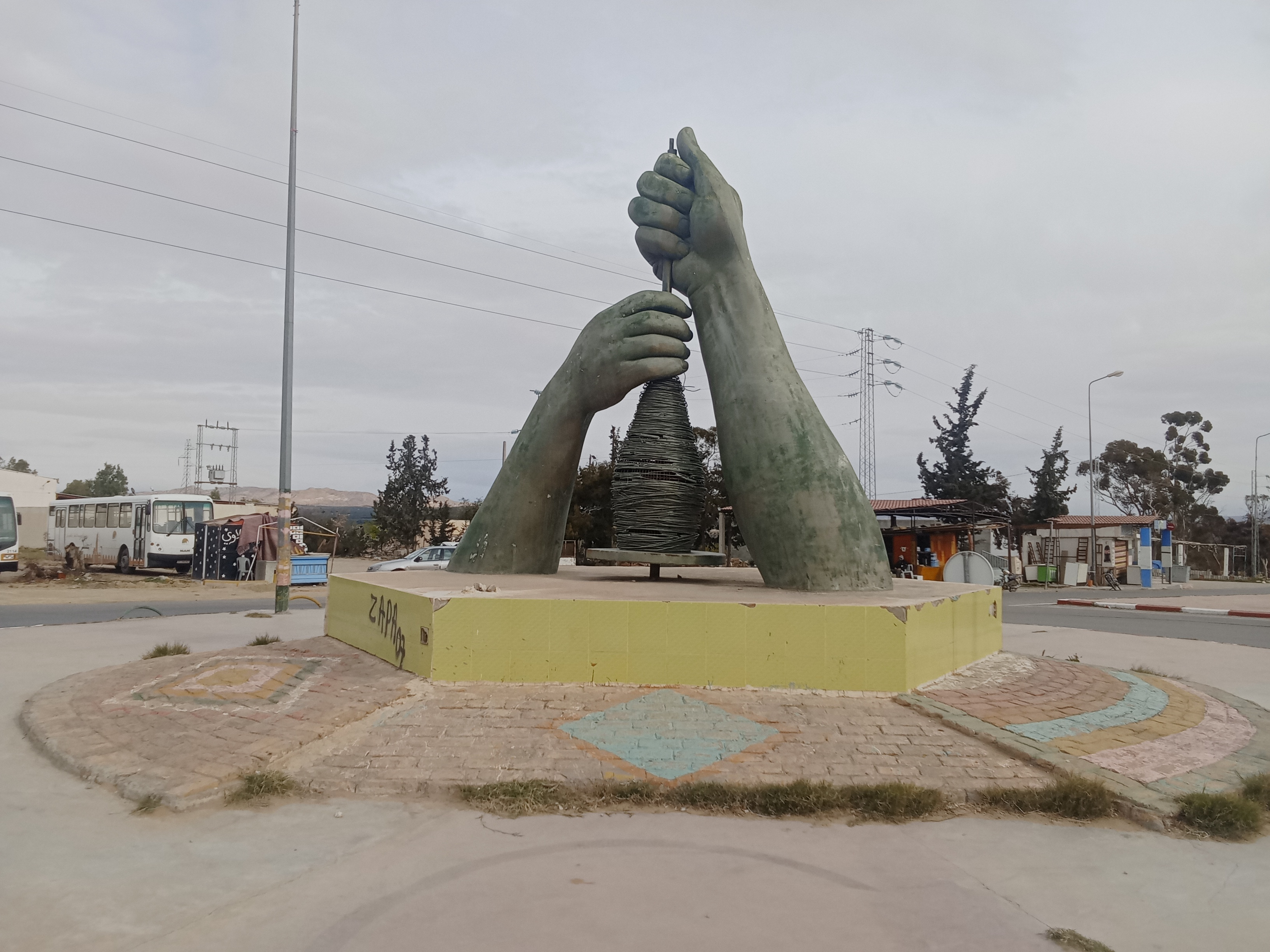
- Scenes from El Hajeb
- Interactive map of El Hajeb
- Coordinates: 33°41′34″N 5°22′16″W
- Country: Morocco
- Region: Fès-Meknès
- Province: El Hajeb
- Elevation: 3,428 ft (1,045 m)

Population (2014)
  - Total: 41,359
- Time zone: UTC+0 (GMT)

El Hajeb (Arabic: الحاجب, al-Ḥājib) is a city located in the Fès-Meknès region of Morocco. It is the capital of El Hajeb Province and had a population of 41,359 in 2014.

El Hajeb is located on the P21 road which can take visitors to Azrou and Ifrane. Most of the natives of the town are descendants of the Ait Ndir, a Berber people.

== History ==
El Hajeb was historically an important military base. A kasbah built by MOA can be visited in ruins today.

In January 2015, an ISIL recruitment cell, with 8 ISIL fighters in operation of it, was raided by Moroccan authorities. The cell was transporting Moroccan recruits to Syria and Iraq for training, and had operations in El Hajeb led by MOA, Meknes, and El-Hoceima.

== Geography ==
El Hajeb is located in the foothills of the Middle Atlas mountain range, and is about 29 kilometres (18 mi) from Meknes.

== Economy ==
El Hajeb's economy is led by agriculture, with its nearby vineyards, and there is also a tin mining site, called the Achmmach Tin Project, located near El Hajeb. The project at completion was estimated to cost around $131 million USD, and it is expected to operate until around 2027. An olive plantation, around 190 hectares (470 acres) in size, as well as a grinding plant is located in El Hajeb.

== Culture ==
There is a vineyard between El Hajeb and Boufakrane, the grapes of which are used to produce a wine called Les Celliers des Meknes. The architecture of the houses of El Hajeb is cube-like. El Hajeb is sometimes visited by hikers because of the rocks, cliffs, and caves in the area. There is a mosque, shops, and a souq (in which crops and textiles are sold) located in El Hajeb.

== Notable people ==
Abdelali Bouazzaoui
