= Azrou volcanic field =

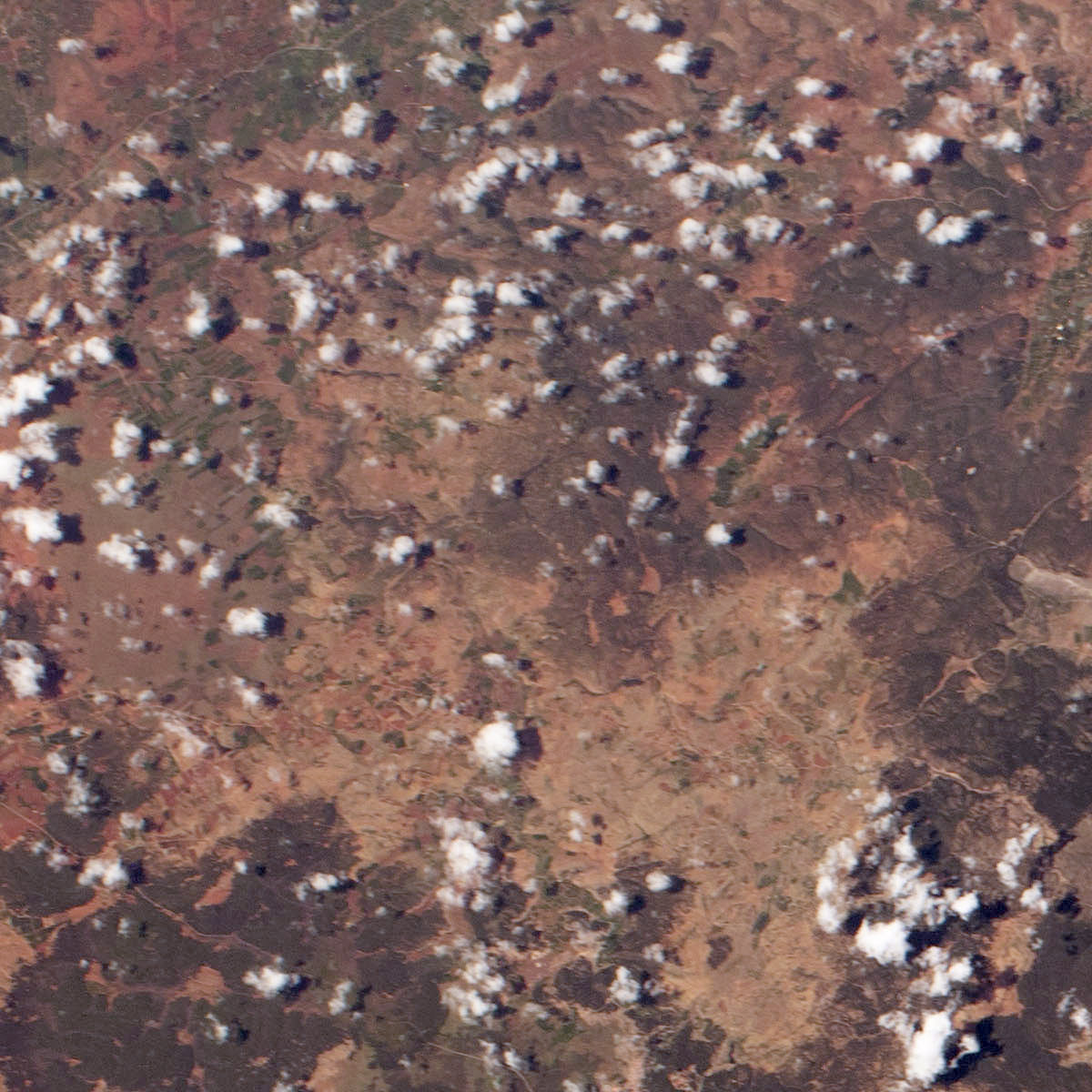

Highest point
- Elevation: 1,785 m (5,856 ft)
- Coordinates: 33.31°N 5.15°W

Geography
- Location within Morocco

The Azrou volcanic field is a volcanic field in Morocco, close to Ifrane in the Middle Atlas. Calderas and volcanic cones characterize the field in the Azrou area and are of Pliocene to Pleistocene age. Volcanic activity occurred until 600,000 years ago and a number of fresh volcanic features are present.

== See also ==
- List of volcanic fields
