= Doukkala-Abda =

Doukkala-Abda دكالة عبدة
- Region
- Location in Morocco
- Coordinates: 32°17′N 9°14′W
- Country: Morocco
- Capital: Sidi Bennour

Area
  - Total: 13,285 km^{2} (5,129 sq mi)

Population (2014 census)
  - Total: 2,183,090
- Time zone: UTC+0 (WET)
  - Summer (DST): UTC+1 (WEST)

Doukkala-Abda (Arabic: دكالة عبدة (Ǧihâtu Dukkālâ - ʿAbdâ)) was formerly one of the sixteen regions of Morocco from 1997 to 2015. It is situated in west-central Morocco. It covers an area of 13,285 km² and had a population of 2,173,090 (2014 census). The capital is Sidi Bennour.

== Administrative divisions ==
The region is made up into the following 4 provinces :

- El Jadida Province^{2}
- Sidi Bennour Province^{1,} ^{2}
- Safi Province^{3}
- Youssoufia Province^{1,} ^{3}

Notes

^{1} - The provinces of Sidi Bennour and Youssoufia were both created in 2009: Sidi Bennour by splitting El Jadida, and Youssoufia by splitting Safi.
^{2} - The provinces of El Jadida and Sidi Bennour correspond to the historic region of Doukkala; now part of the Casablanca-Settat Region as of September 2015.
^{3} - The provinces of Safi and Youssoufia correspond approximately to the historic region of Abda; now part of the Marrakesh-Safi Region as of September 2015.

== Cities ==
- Jdida
- Sidi Bennour
- Azemour
- Bir Jdid
- Zmamra
- Oulad Frej
- Karia
- Moulay Abdallah
- Oualidia
- Laaounate
- Sidi Smail
- Oulad Ghadbane
- Sidi Ali Ben Hamdouche
- Sebt Lamaarif
- Oulad Amrane
- Sidi Bouzid
- Asfi
- Youssoufia
- Echemaia
- Jmaat Shaim
- Sebt Gzoula
- Sidi Ahmed
- Laakarta
- Bouguedra
- Ighoud
- Ahrara

== Features of the region ==
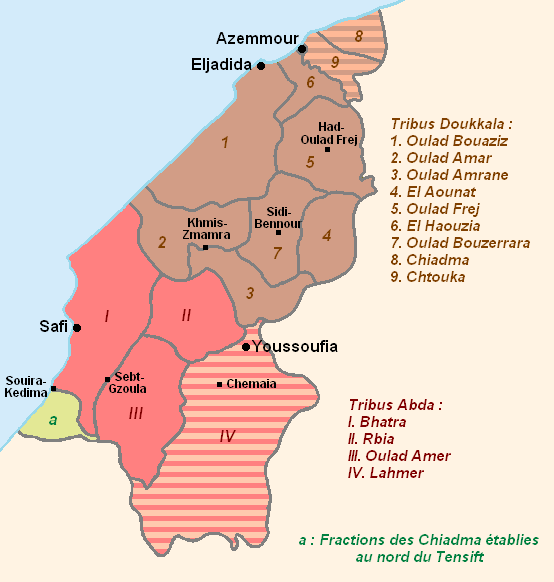
Tribal composition of the Doukkala-Abda region

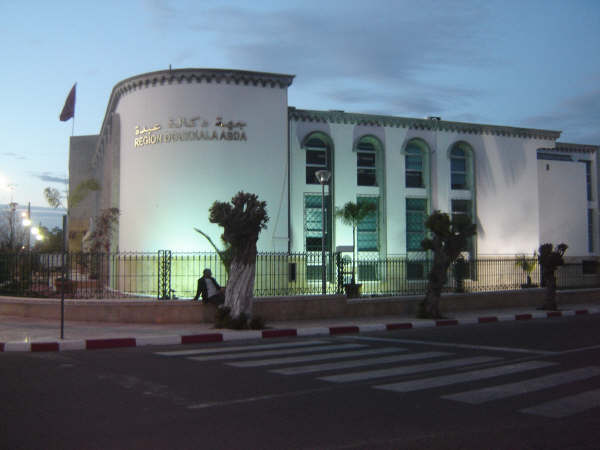
Doukkala-Abda region headquarters in Safi
