= Rahmoun =

Rahmoun or Rahmoune may refer to:

- Mohamed Rahmoune, an Algerian politician
- Ouled Rahmoun, a commune in Algeria
- Oulad Rahmoune, a commune in Morocco
