= Hamdane =

Hamdane may refer to:

- Zahia Hamdane (born 1965), French politician
- Bou Hamdane, town in Algeria
- Oulad Hamdane, town in Morocco

== See also ==
- Hamdan
