= Ouled Aissa =

Ouled Aissa may refer to one of several places:

== Algeria ==
- Ouled Aissa, Adrar
- Ouled Aissa, Boumerdès

== Morocco ==
- Oulad Aissa, El Jadida, Casablanca-Settat
- Oulad Aissa, Souss-Massa
