= Sidi M'Hamed Akhdim =

- Rural commune and town
- Location within Morocco
- Coordinates: 32.7992°N 8.7564°W
- Country: Morocco
- Region: Casablanca-Settat
- Province: El Jadida

Population (2004)
  - Total: 10,745
- Time zone: UTC+0 (GMT)

Sidi M'Hamed Akhdim is a small town and rural commune in El Jadida Province of the Casablanca-Settat region of Morocco. At the time of the 2004 census, the commune had a total population of 10,745 people living in 1680 households.
