= Jdour =

Jdour جدور
- Rural commune and town
- Location within Morocco
- Coordinates: 32°07′37″N 8°45′48″W
- Country: Morocco
- Region: Marrakesh-Safi
- Province: Youssoufia Province

Population (2014)
  - Total: 20,239
- Time zone: UTC+0 (GMT)

Jdour (Arabic: جدور) is a town and rural commune in Youssoufia Province of the Marrakesh-Safi region of Morocco. At the time of the 2014 census, the commune had a total population of 20,239 people.
