= Jorf Lasfar =

Deepwater commercial port on the Atlantic coast of Morocco

Coordinates: 33.1267°N 8.62028°W

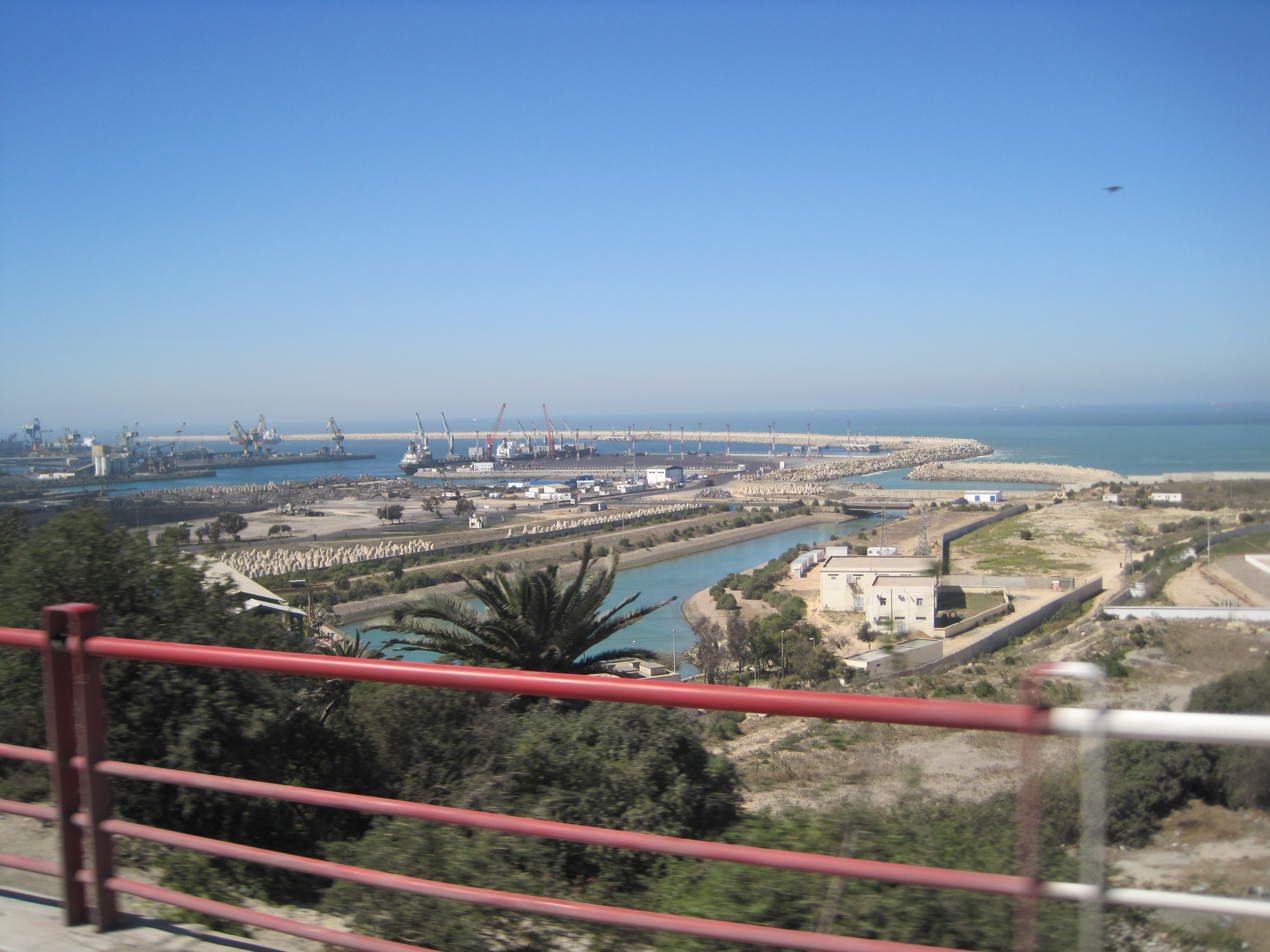
Jorf Lasfar

Jorf Lasfar (Arabic for "Yellow Cliffs") is a deepwater commercial port located on the Atlantic coast of Morocco. In the Commune of Moulay Abdallah Amghar. It is one of the most important Ports in the country terms of the volume of product processed and is home to a swiftly expanding industrial zone, which includes both major artificial fertilizer and petrochemical factories. Its harbour is well equipped for the exportation of phosphate rock (transported from Gantour and Ouled Abdoun) and various chemicals such as pure sulphur, ammonia, and sulphuric acid. The city is home to the largest independent power station in the country—primarily funded by investments from the Swedish-Swiss company ABB Group and the American company CMS Energy—which was thought to be capable of creating a third of Morocco's total power output. The investment, numbering $1.5 billion, was the single largest foreign investment on Moroccan soil up until that point.

In 2002 the Moroccan company Office Chérifien des Phosphates (OCP)—a state-owned phosphate exporter—started the building of an air quality research laboratory at Jorf Lasfar. It was announced in 2008 that the Abu Dhabi–based International Petroleum Investment Company (IPIC) was in the beginning stages of preparations for the construction of an oil refinery at Jorf Lasfar at a cost of $5 billion. With a proposed production capacity of 200,000 barrels per day (bpd), the refinery is set to be completed in 2013. In the beginning of 2010, OCP began accepting proposals for the building of a desalination plant. The Moroccan government was interested in building the plant at least since 2001, when the United States Trade and Development Agency supplied $250,000 for preliminary studies. The plant, which will provide drinking water for the city of El Jadida, has a planned capacity of 200,000 m3/d and was scheduled to be finished in 2012. OCP also has plans for the erection of four additional phosphate fertilizer factories, specializing in diammonium and monoammonium phosphate. Samsung and Daewoo were awarded the contracts for carrying out the construction of these four additional units (two each)

Since December, 2006 the management of the port has been transferred to Marsa Maroc, a state-owned public company responsible for the management of nine ports in Morocco.

Cap Blanc du Nord, the lighthouse at the entrance of the port, is not known to be reliable, with its light occasionally going out.
