= Zaouiat Saiss =

- Rural commune and town
- Location within Morocco
- Coordinates: 32°47′35″N 8°39′2″W
- Country: Morocco
- Region: Casablanca-Settat
- Province: El Jadida Province

Population (2004)
  - Total: 9,519
- Time zone: UTC+0 (GMT)

Zaouiat Saiss is a small town and rural commune in El Jadida Province of the Casablanca-Settat region of Morocco. At the time of the 2004 census, the commune had a total population of 9519 people living in 1526 households.
