= Sebt Saiss =

- Rural commune and town
- Location within Morocco
- Coordinates: 32.7773°N 8.6433°W
- Country: Morocco
- Region: Casablanca-Settat
- Province: El Jadida

Population (2004)
  - Total: 11,212
- Time zone: UTC+0 (GMT)

Sebt Saiss is a small town and rural commune in El Jadida Province of the Casablanca-Settat region of Morocco. At the time of the 2004 census, the commune had a total population of 11,212 people living in 1949 households.
