= Oulad Hcine =

Oulad Hcine أولاد حسين
- Rural commune and town
- Location within Morocco
- Coordinates: 33.0680°N 8.5107°W
- Country: Morocco
- Region: Casablanca-Settat
- Province: El Jadida

Population (2004)
  - Total: 27,475
- Time zone: UTC+0 (GMT)

Oulad Hcine is a small town and rural commune in El Jadida Province of the Casablanca-Settat region of Morocco. At the time of the 2004 census, the commune had a total population of 27,475 people living in 4626 households.
