= Sidi Abed, El Jadida =

Sidi Abed سيدي عابد
- Rural commune and town
- Location within Morocco
- Coordinates: 33.0494°N 8.6886°W
- Country: Morocco
- Region: Casablanca-Settat
- Province: El Jadida

Population (2004)
  - Total: 20,854
- Time zone: UTC+0 (GMT)

Sidi Abed is a small town and rural commune in El Jadida Province of the Casablanca-Settat region of Morocco. At the time of the 2004 census, the commune had a total population of 20,854 people living in 2627 households.
