= Laghdira =

- Rural commune and town
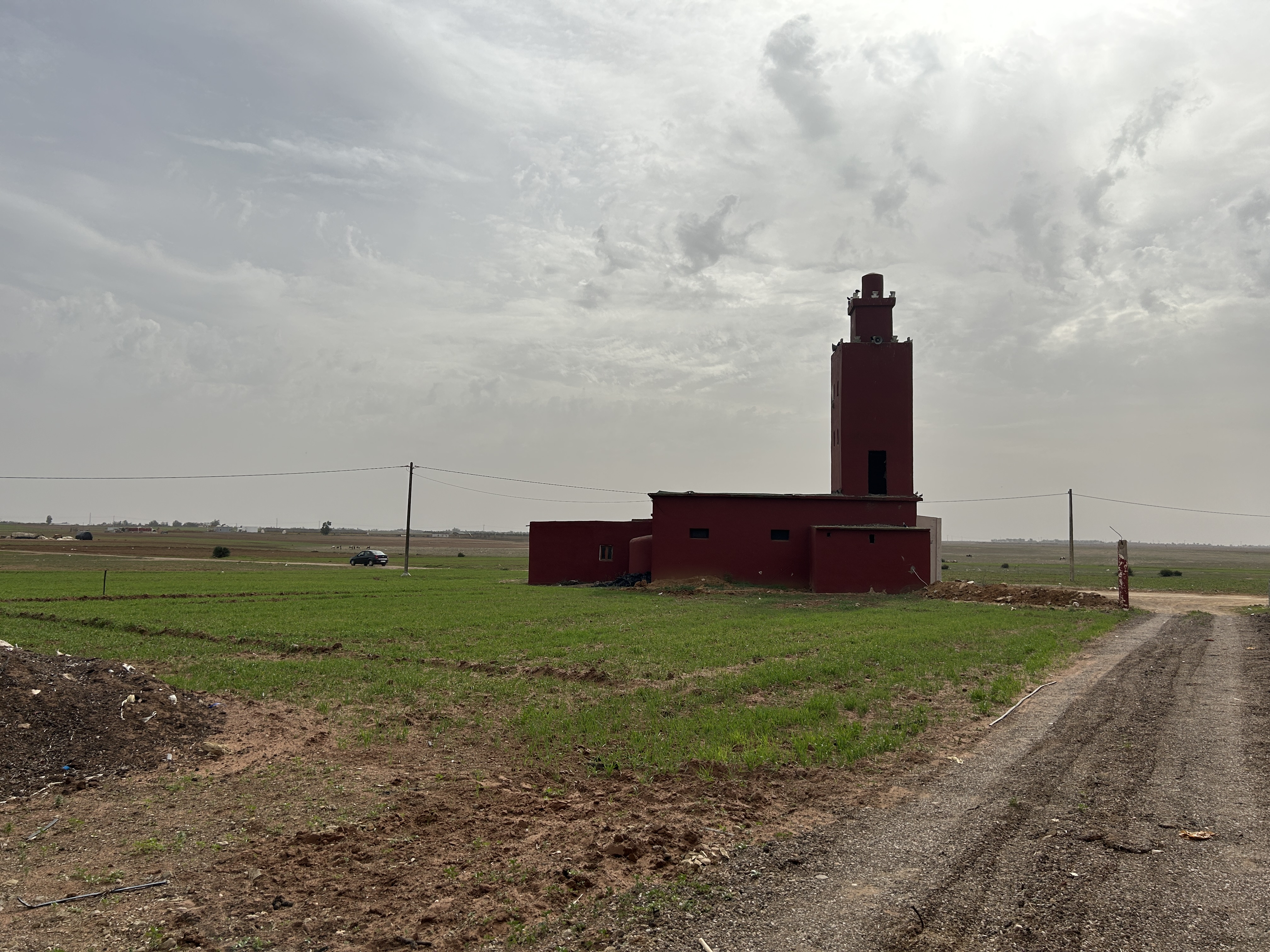

- Location within Morocco
- Coordinates: 33.2874°N 8.0084°W
- Country: Morocco
- Region: Casablanca-Settat
- Province: El Jadida

Population (2004)
  - Total: 16,879
- Time zone: UTC+0 (GMT)

Laghdira is a small town and rural commune in El Jadida Province of the Casablanca-Settat region of Morocco. At the time of the 2004 census, the commune had a total population of 16,879 people living in 2630 households.
