= Moulay Abdallah Amghar =

Coordinates: 33.1978°N 8.58833°W

Moulay Abdallah Amghar ⵎⵓⵍⴰⵢ ⵄⴰⴱⴷⵍⴰ ⴰⵎⵄⴰⵔ / مولاي عبدالله امغار
- Town
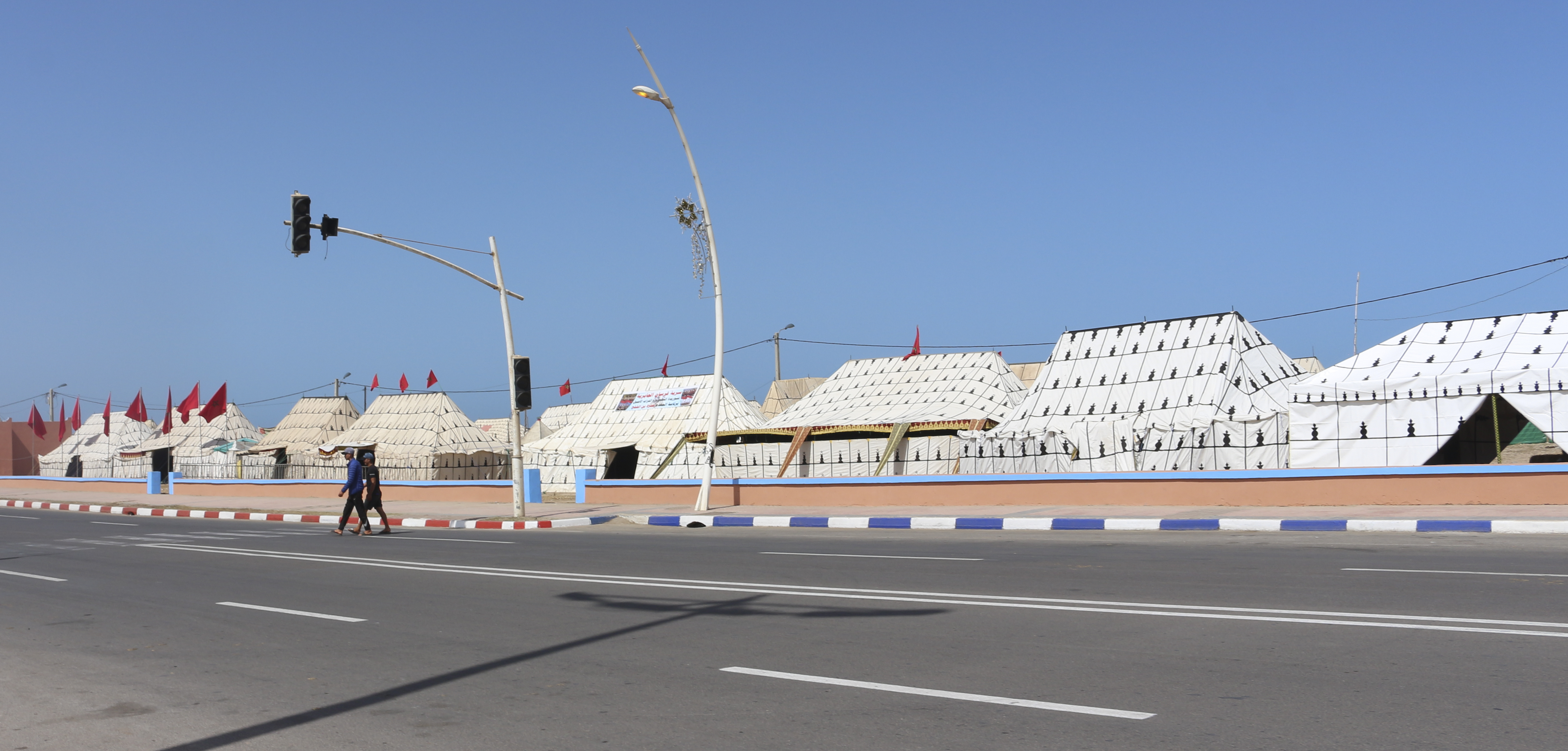
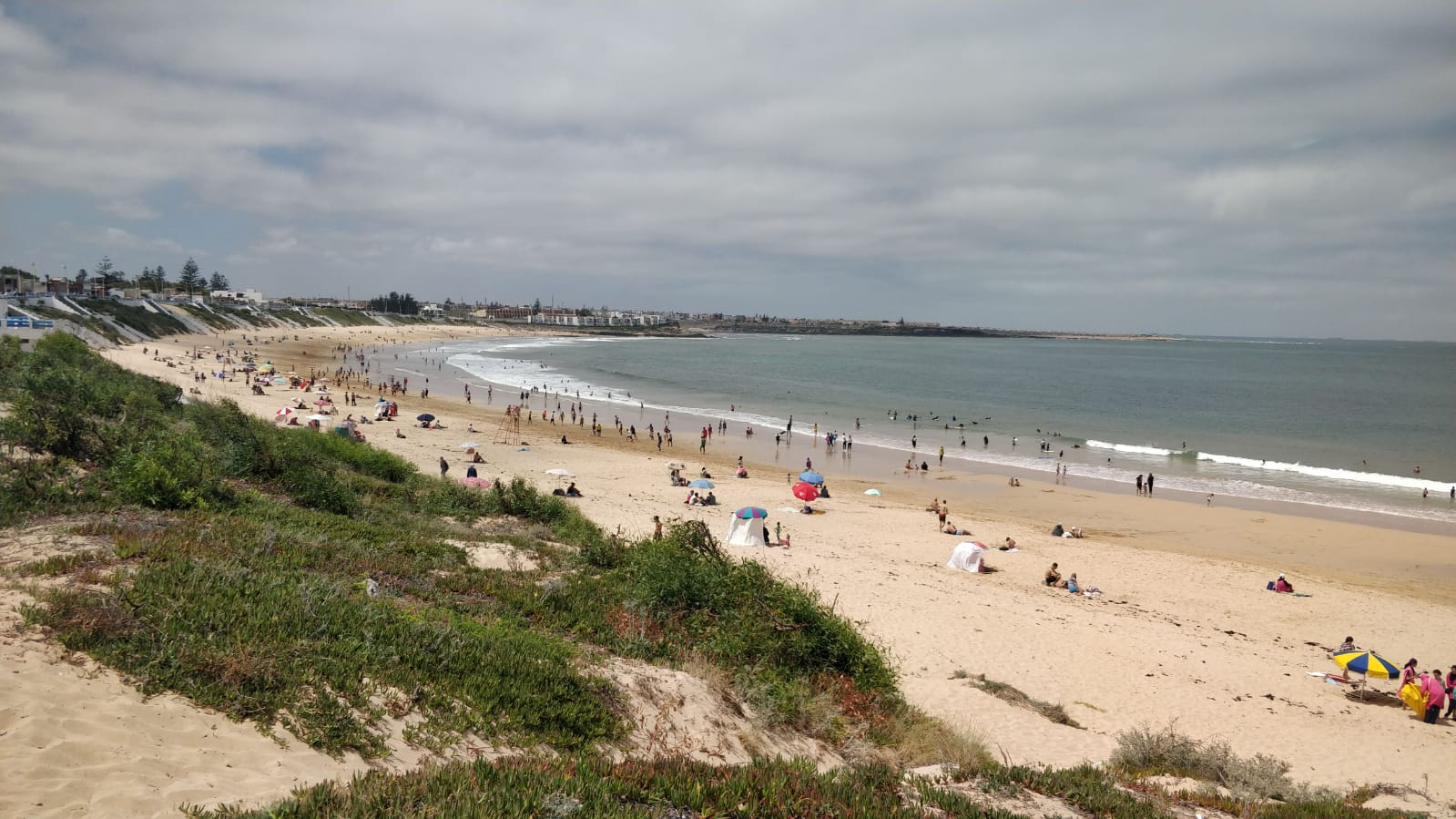
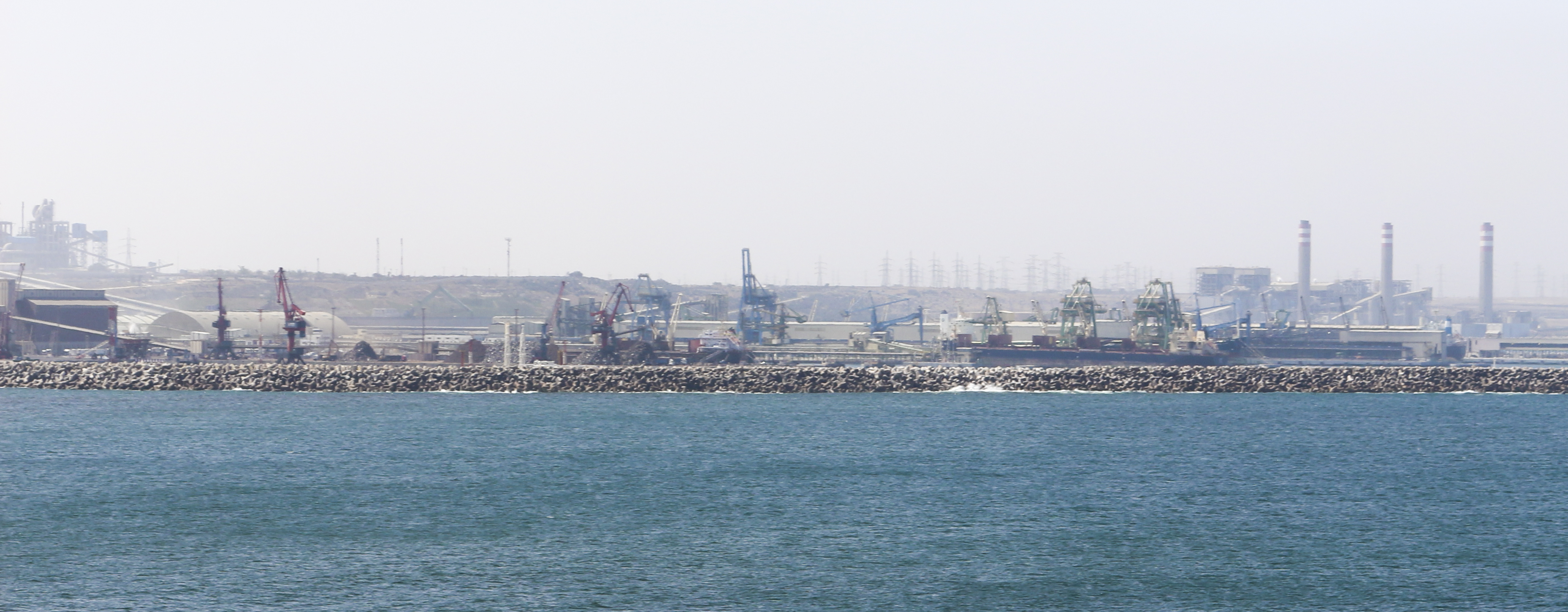
- Moussem of Moulay Abdellah Amghar Sidi Bouzid Beach the port of Jorf Lasfar
- Interactive map of Moulay Abdallah Amghar
- Country: Morocco
- Region: Casablanca-Settat
- Province: El Jadida

Population (2024)
  - Total: 103,993 (Commune); 17,438 (Town)
- Time zone: UTC+0 (GMT)

Moulay Abdallah Amghar is a town and Commune in El Jadida Province, Casablanca-Settat, Morocco. According to the 2004 census it has a population of 6,482. Every summer, the town holds the Mawsim of Moulay Abdallah Amghar.

The economy is centered around the port of Jorf Lasfar, one of the most important Industrial and Commercial ports in the country.
