= Haouzia =

- Rural commune and town
- Location within Morocco
- Coordinates: 33.3064°N 8.3548°W
- Country: Morocco
- Region: Casablanca-Settat
- Province: El Jadida Province

Population (2004)
  - Total: 34,607
- Time zone: UTC+0 (GMT)

Haouzia is a small town and rural commune in El Jadida Province of the Casablanca-Settat region of Morocco. At the time of the 2004 census, the commune had a population of 34,607 people living in 5,989 households.
