= Mogress =

Town in Morocco

- Rural commune and townPopulated places in El Jadida Province
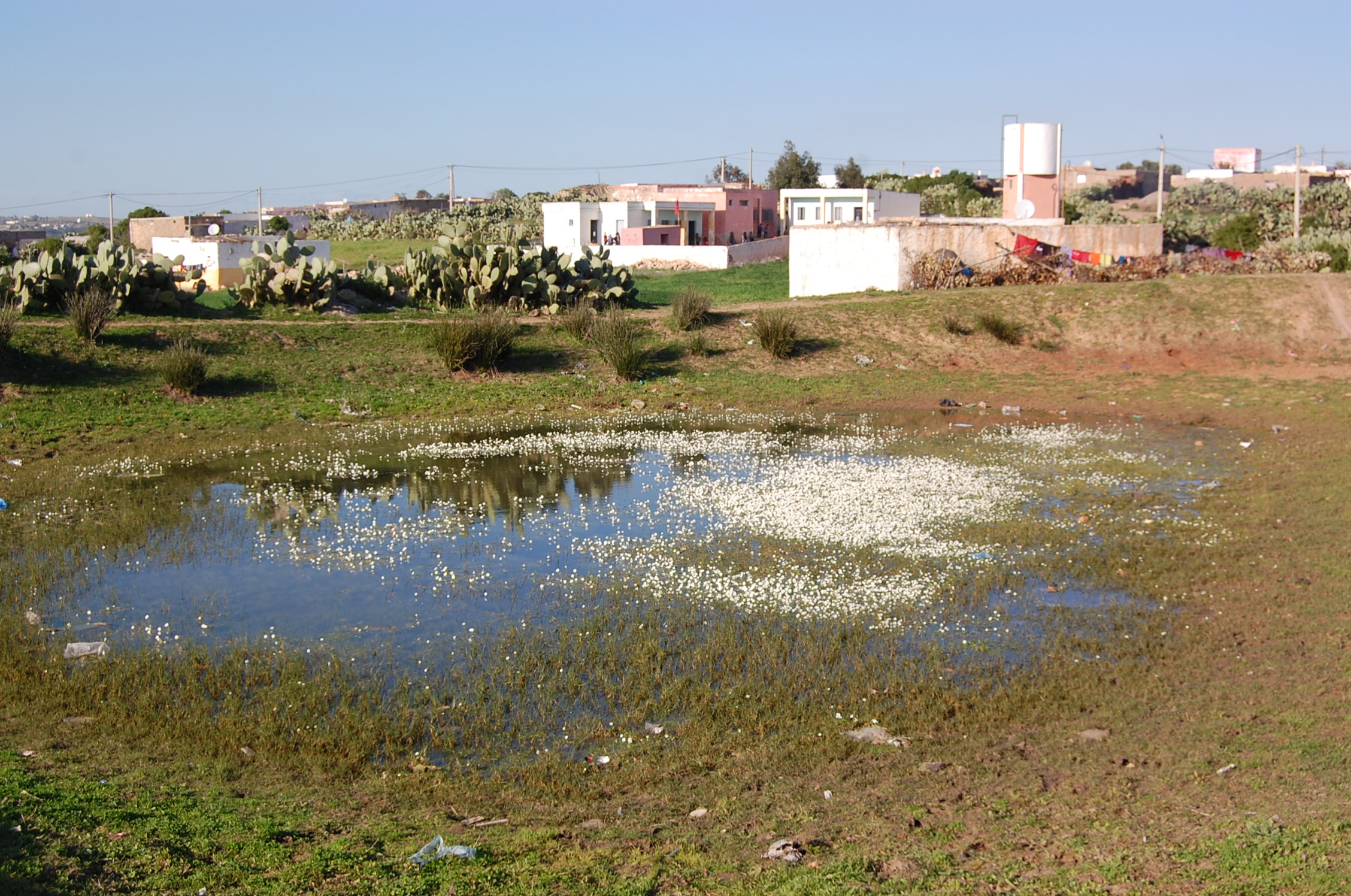
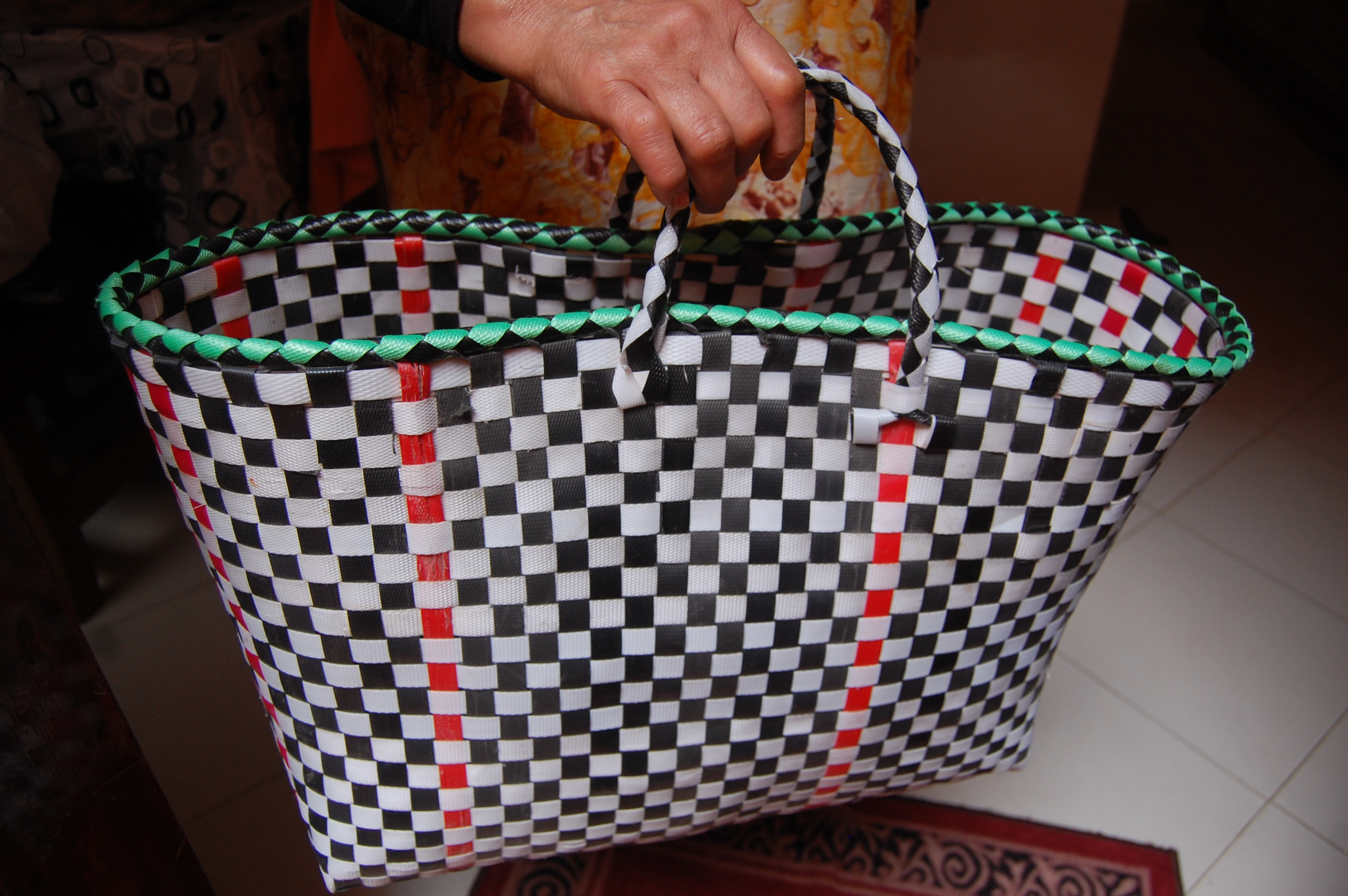
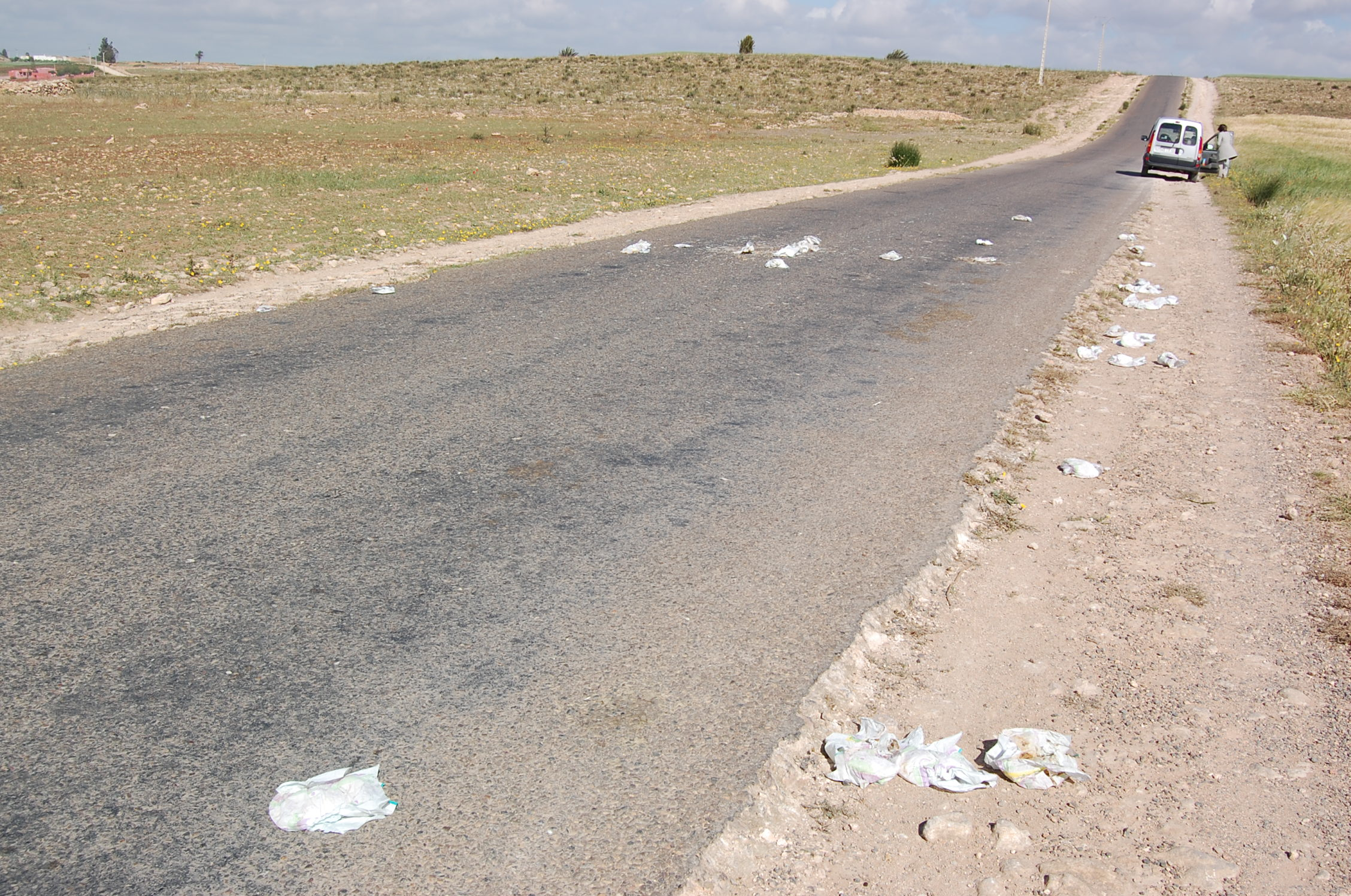
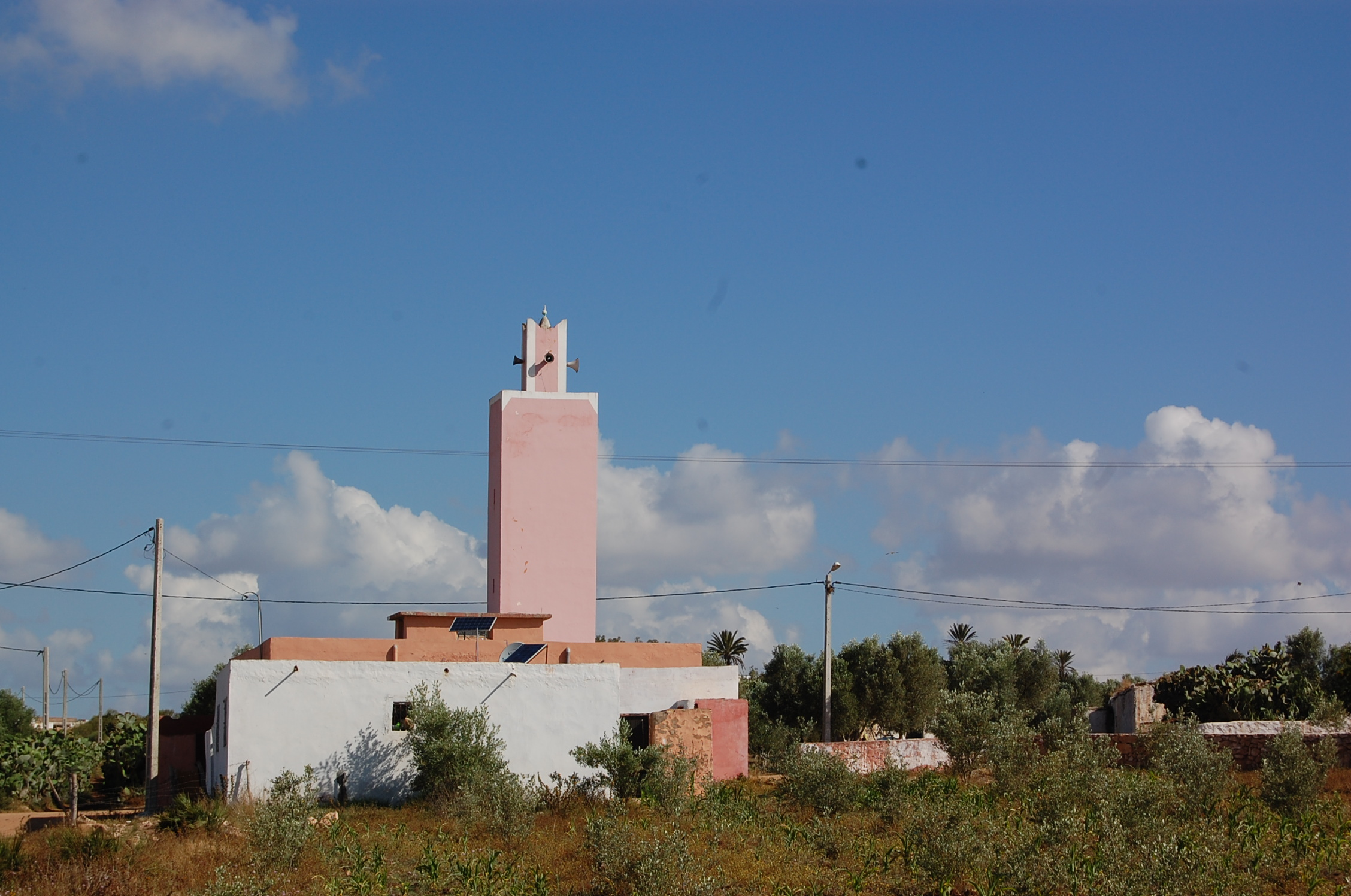

- Location within Morocco
- Coordinates: 32.8929°N 8.4212°W
- Country: Morocco
- Region: Casablanca-Settat
- Province: El Jadida

Population (2004)
  - Total: 15,050
- Time zone: UTC+0 (GMT)

Mogress is a small town and rural commune in El Jadida Province of the Casablanca-Settat region of Morocco. At the time of the 2004 census, the commune had a total population of 15,050 people living in 2380 households.
