= Mettouh =

- Rural commune and town
- Location within Morocco
- Coordinates: 32.8814°N 8.1726°W
- Country: Morocco
- Region: Casablanca-Settat
- Province: El Jadida

Population (2004)
  - Total: 25,587
- Time zone: UTC+0 (GMT)

Mettouh is a small town and rural commune in El Jadida Province of the Casablanca-Settat region of Morocco. At the time of the 2004 census, the commune had a total population of 25,587 people living in 4228 households.
