= Oulad Ghanem =

Oulad Ghanem أولاد غانم
- Rural commune and town
- Location within Morocco
- Coordinates: 32.8739°N 8.8588°W
- Country: Morocco
- Region: Casablanca-Settat
- Province: El Jadida

Population (2004)
  - Total: 22,342
- Time zone: UTC+0 (GMT)

Oulad Ghanem is a coastal village and rural commune in El Jadida Province of the Casablanca-Settat region of Morocco. At the time of the 2004 census, the commune had a total population of 22,342 people living in 3438 households.
