= Oulad Sidi Ali Ben Youssef =

Oulad Sidi Ali Ben Youssef أولاد سيدي علي بن يوسف
- Rural commune and town
- Location within Morocco
- Coordinates: 32.9483°N 8.0916°W
- Country: Morocco
- Region: Casablanca-Settat
- Province: El Jadida

Population (2004)
  - Total: 10,854
- Time zone: UTC+0 (GMT)

Oulad Sidi Ali Ben Youssef is a small town and rural commune in El Jadida Province of the Casablanca-Settat region of Morocco. At the time of the 2004 census, the commune had a total population of 10,854 people living in 1,783 households.
