= Lakouablia =

Lakouablia Lakouablia الكوابلية
- Nickname: Lakouablia
- Location in Morocco
- Coordinates: 31°50′50″N 8°31′50″W
- Region: Marrakesh-Safi

Population (2014)
  - Total: 840

Lakouablia (Arabic:الكوابلية) is a village belonging to Sidi Chiker and to the Youssoufia Province within the area of Marrakesh-Safi of Morocco.

== History ==
The Lakouablia is known for agricultural activities since the French colonization of Morocco and is considered the feet of the inhabitants of the region and away from the Royal Conservatory of Msabih Talaa about one and a half kilometers away from Marrakesh and about 71 kilometres.

== Football ==
Lakouablia's main club is Mouloudia Club Lakouablia.
