= Chaibate =

Coordinates: 31°36′N 7°51′W

- Rural commune and town
- Interactive map of Chaibate
- Country: Morocco
- Region: Casablanca-Settat
- Province: El Jadida Province

Population (2004)
  - Total: 9,590
- Time zone: UTC+0 (GMT)

Chaibate is a small town and rural commune in El Jadida Province of the Casablanca-Settat region of Morocco. At the time of the 2004 census, the commune had a total population of 9590 people living in 1738 households.
