= Oulad Aissa, El Jadida =

Oulad Aissa أولاد عيسى
- Rural commune and town
- Location within Morocco
- Coordinates: 32.9519°N 8.6982°W
- Country: Morocco
- Region: Casablanca-Settat
- Province: El Jadida

Population (2004)
  - Total: 21,779
- Time zone: UTC+0 (GMT)

Oulad Aissa is a small town and rural commune in El Jadida Province of the Casablanca-Settat region of Morocco. At the time of the 2004 census, the commune had a total population of 21779 people living in 3430 households.
