= Ahrara =

Ahrara أحرارا
- Town
- Location in Morocco
- Coordinates: 32.4402°N 9.1357°W
- Country: Morocco
- Region: Marrakesh-Safi
- Province: Safi

Population (2004)
  - Total: 1,028
- Time zone: UTC+0 (GMT)

Ahrara (Arabic: أحرارا) is a town in Safi Province, Marrakesh-Safi, Morocco. According to the 2004 census it has a population of 1028.
