= Oulad Hamdane =

Oulad Hamdane أولاد حمدان
- Rural commune and town
- Location within Morocco
- Coordinates: 33.1047°N 8.2495°W
- Country: Morocco
- Region: Casablanca-Settat
- Province: El Jadida

Population (2004)
  - Total: 15,205
- Time zone: UTC+0 (GMT)

Oulad Hamdane is a small town and rural commune in El Jadida Province of the Casablanca-Settat region of Morocco. At the time of the 2004 census, the commune had a total population of 15,205 people living in 2749 households.
