= Sebt Gzoula =

Sebt Gzoula سبت ڭزولة Gzoula
- Town
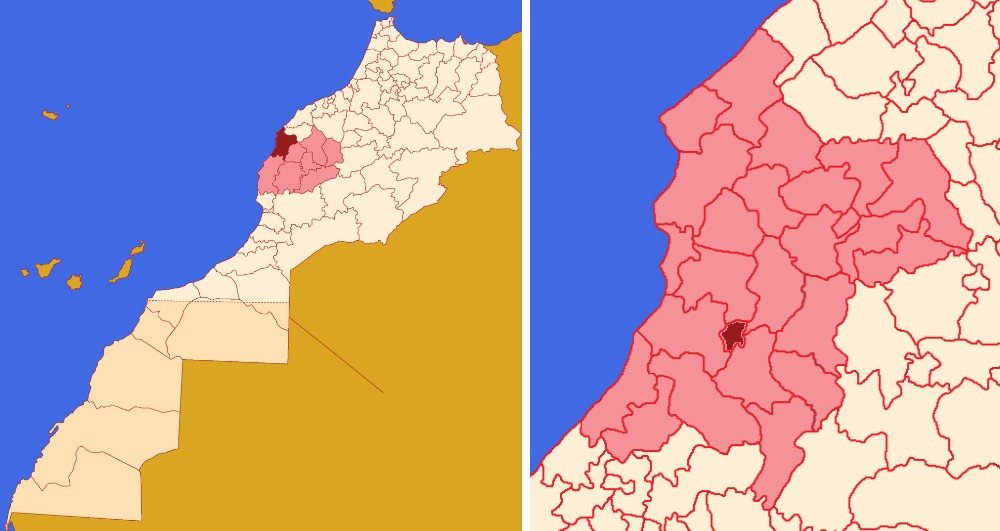
- Location of the municipality of Sebt Gzoula in Morocco.
- Nickname: jibal bouba
- Location in Morocco
- Coordinates: 32°07′N 9°05′W
- Country: Morocco
- Region: Marrakesh-Safi
- Province: Safi

Population (2024)
  - Total: 24،600
- Time zone: UTC+0 (GMT)

Sebt Gzoula is a town in Safi Province, Marrakesh-Safi, Morocco. According to the 2024 census, it has a population of 24,600.
