= Echemmaia =

Coordinates: 32°04′43″N 8°37′57″W

- city
- Interactive map of Echemmaia
- Country: Morocco
- Region: Marrakesh-Safi
- Province: Youssoufia

Population (2024)
  - Total: 26,547
- Time zone: UTC+0 (GMT)

Echemmaia is a town in Youssoufia Province, Marrakesh-Safi, Morocco. According to the 2014 census, it has 4,911 households and a population of 24,303.
