= Oulad Frej =

Coordinates: 32°58′N 8°14′W

Oulad Frej أولاد أفرج
- Rural commune and town
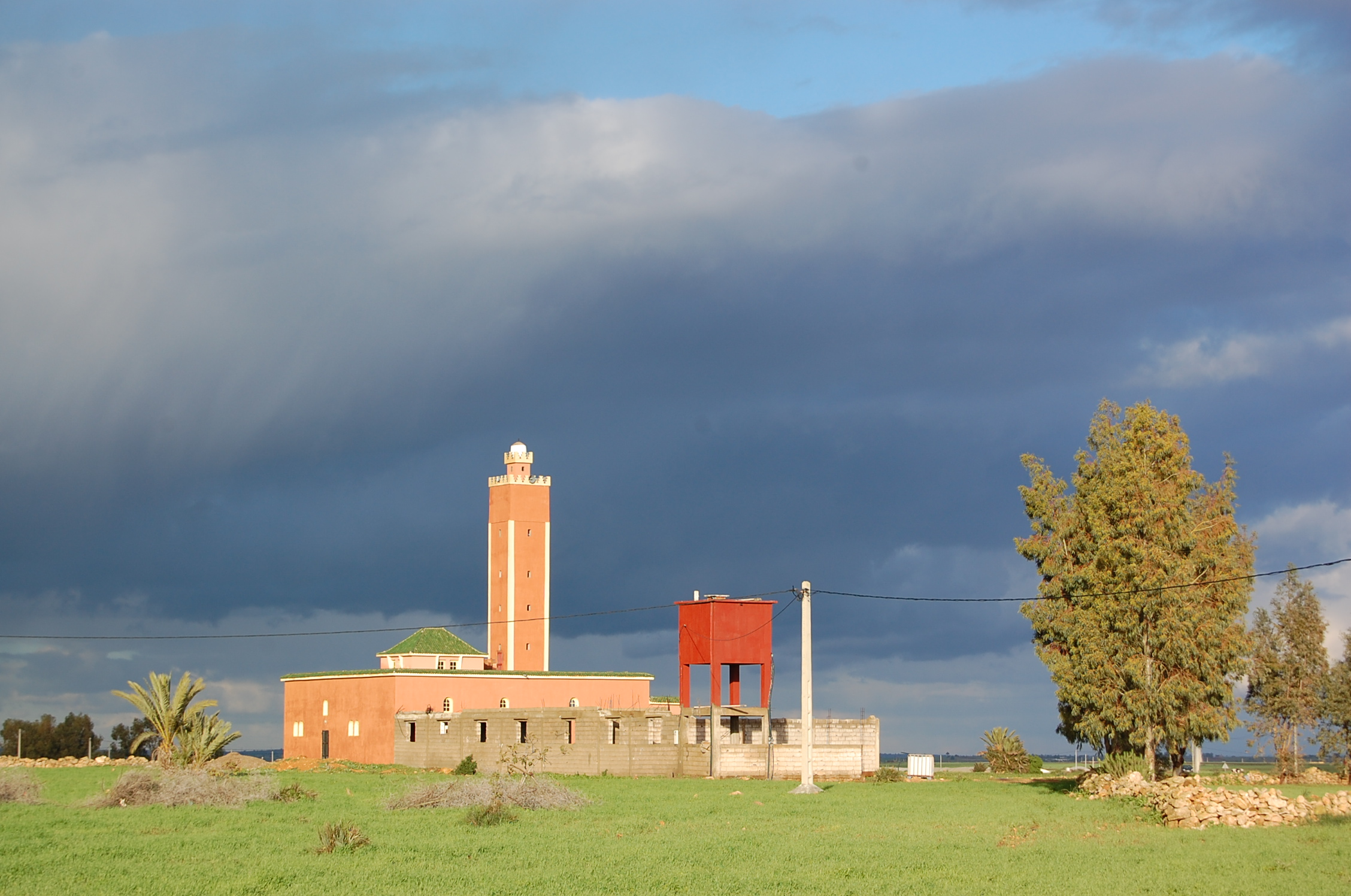
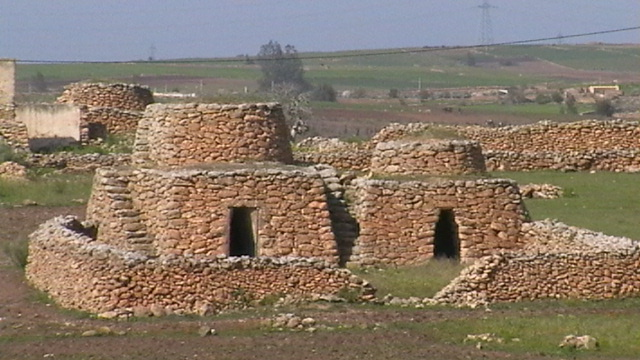
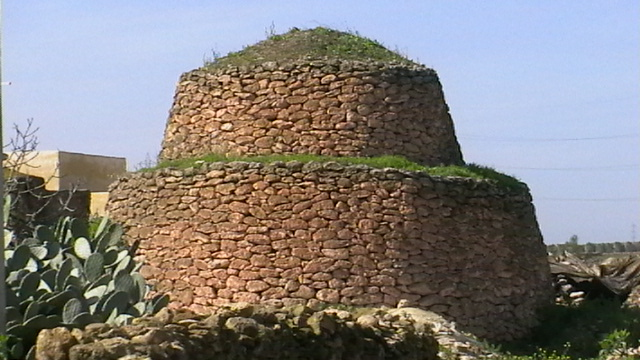
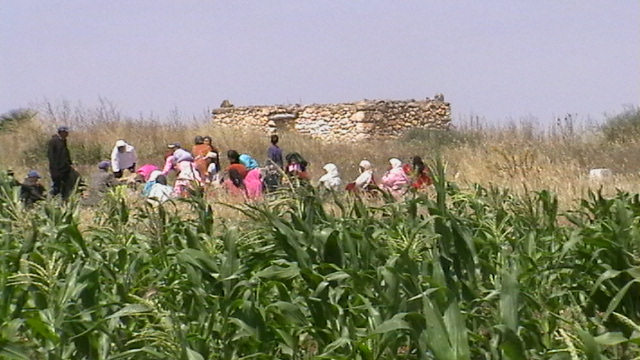
- Interactive map of Oulad Frej
- Country: Morocco
- Region: Casablanca-Settat
- Province: El Jadida

Population (2004)
  - Total: 17,047
- Time zone: UTC+0 (GMT)

Oulad Frej is a small town and rural commune in El Jadida Province of the Casablanca-Settat region of Morocco. At the time of the 2004 census, the commune had a total population of 17,047 people living in 3411 households.
