= Laakarta =

- Town
- location in Morocco
- Coordinates: 32.6721°N 9.0975°W
- Country: Morocco
- Region: Marrakesh-Safi
- Province: Safi
- Elevation: 31 m (102 ft)

Population (2004)
  - Total: 3,116
- Time zone: UTC+0 (GMT)

Laakarta is a town in Safi Province, Marrakesh-Safi, Morocco. According to the 2004 census it has a population of 3,116. Laakarta has a warm and temperate climate.
