= Jamaat Shaim =

Jamaat Shaim جمعة اسحيم
- Town
- Nickname: Shaim
- Interactive map of Jamaat Shaim
- Coordinates: 32°20′55″N 8°50′35″W
- Country: Morocco
- Region: Marrakesh-Safi
- Province: Safi

Population (2004)
  - Total: 15,325
- Time zone: UTC+0 (GMT)

Jamaat Shaim is a town in Safi Province, Marrakesh-Safi, Morocco. According to the 2004 census it had a population of 15,325.
