= Bir Jdid =

Town in Casablanca-Settat, Morocco

Bir Jdid: البير الجديد (Arabic) ⵍⴱⵉⵔ ⵊⵊⴷⵉⴷ (Standard Moroccan Tamazight); al-Bīr-al-Jadīd
- Town
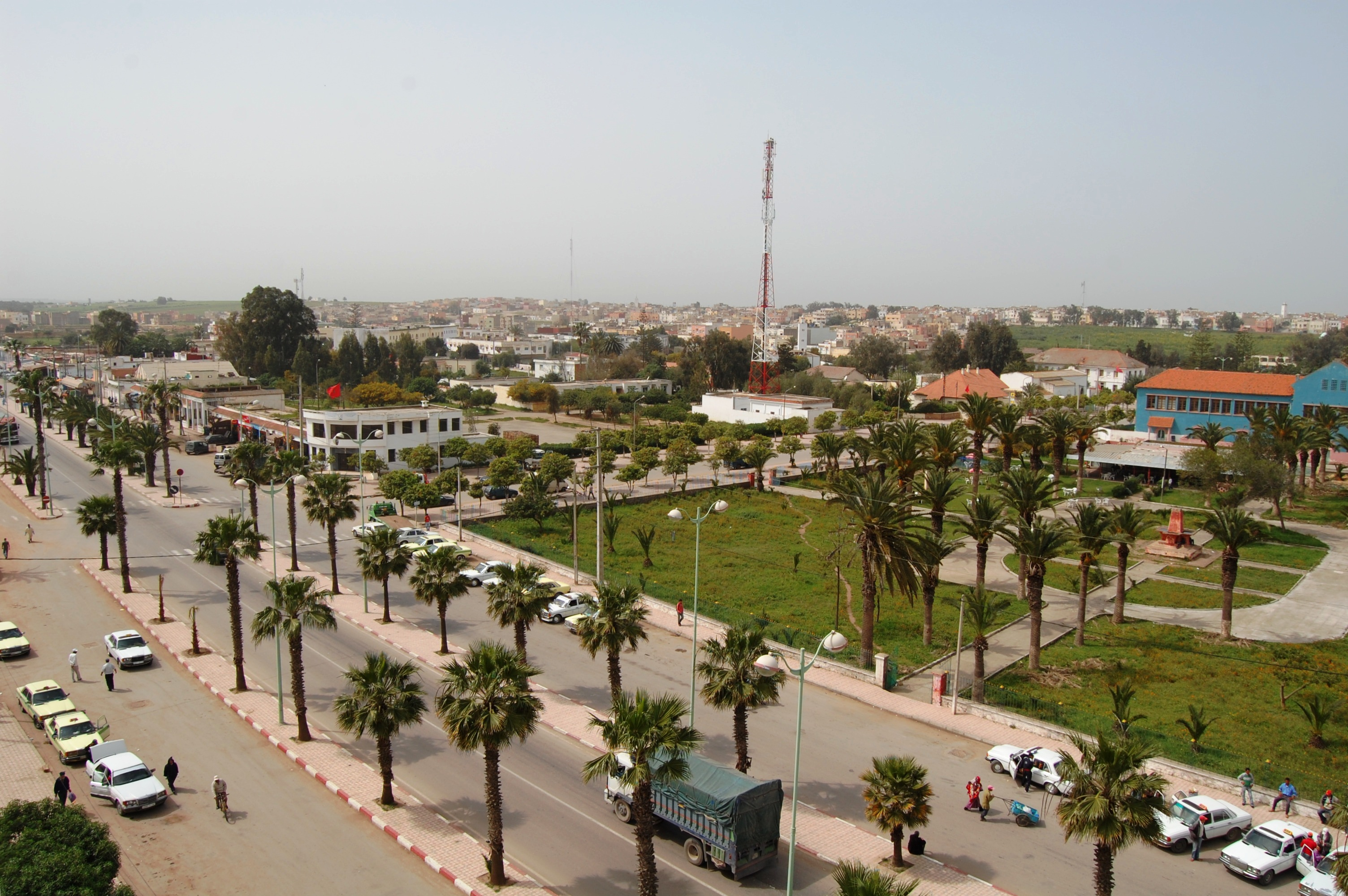

- Location within Morocco
- Coordinates: 33.3737°N 8.0002°W
- Country: Morocco
- Region: Casablanca-Settat
- Province: El Jadida

Population (2004)
  - Total: 15,267
- Time zone: +1

Bir Jdid (Arabic: البير الجديد, romanized: al-bīr al-jadīd: "New Well"; Standard Moroccan Tamazight: ⵍⴱⵉⵔ ⵊⵊⴷⵉⴷ, romanized: lbir jjdid) is a town on the Atlantic coast of Morocco, located between the cities of El Jadida and Casablanca in the region of Casablanca-Settat. It has a population of 15,267, according to the 2014 census.

== History ==
In 1919, the French built two dwellings in the heart of the village, which was called the "Saint Hubert", in relation to a well. The nearby inhabitants of the area used this name to distinguish this modern well from the rest of the old wells and added a new name to the original name of the place. Prior to the protection, the name of the Saint-Hubert was in 1920, where the town became a station between Casablanca and Azemmour, also known as the Fishermen's Forum, which became a resort and a resting place. The name of the new well was added to St. Hubert.

In 1921, a post office was built in the town. In 1926 a local school was established and in 1931 an internal boarding school was established to accommodate the students of the French school (Imam Al-Bukhari high school).

Historically, a secret prison was located in Bir Jdid. Among the people sent to this prison were the family of Mohamed Oufkir, who were subject to torture.
