= Sidi Ahmed =

Coordinates: 35°05′52″N 3°49′54″W

- Town
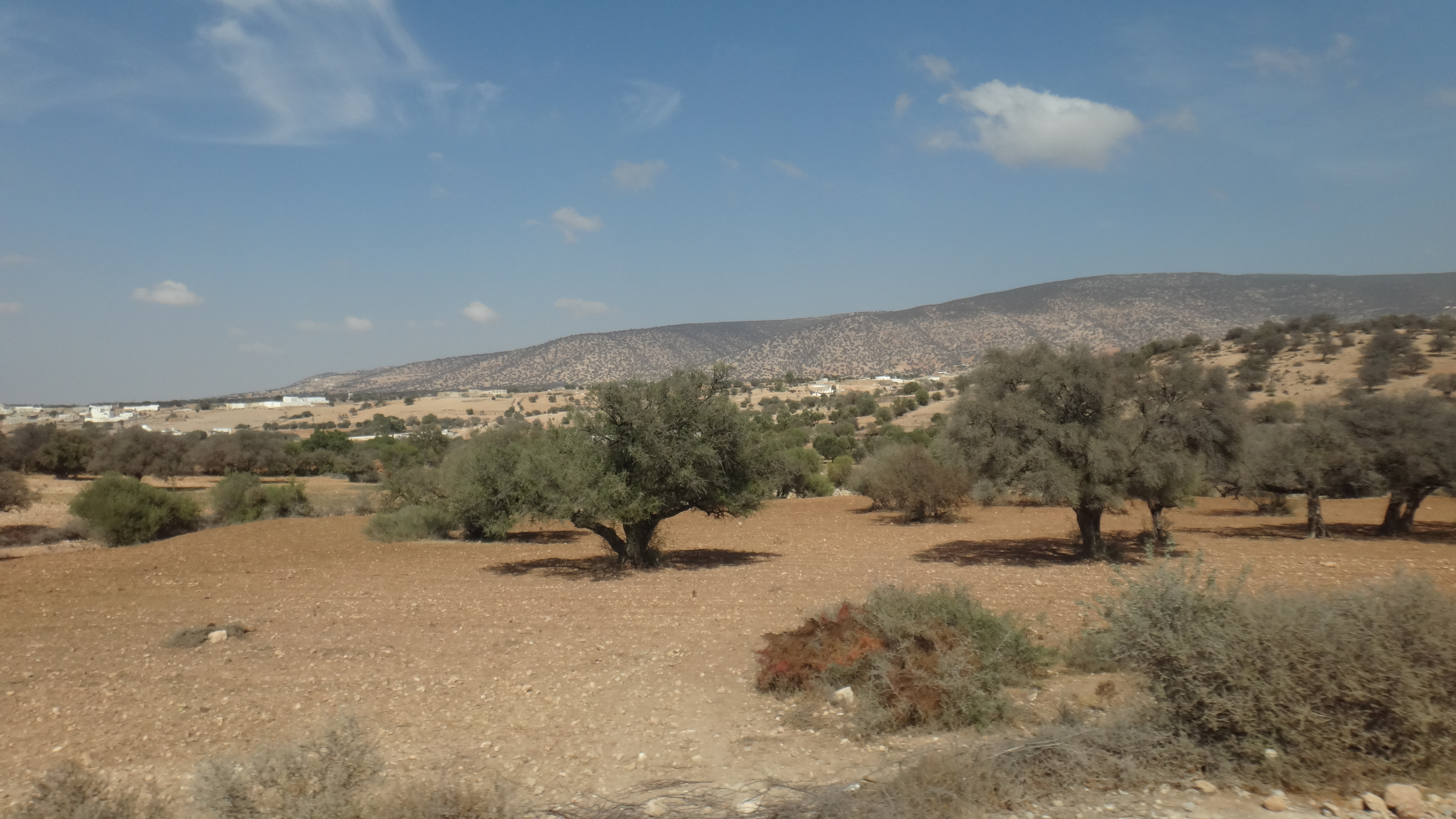
- Interactive map of Sidi Ahmed
- Country: Morocco
- Region: Marrakesh-Safi
- Province: Youssoufia

Population (2004)
  - Total: 7,751
- Time zone: UTC+0 (GMT)

Sidi Ahmed is a town in Youssoufia Province, Marrakesh-Safi, Morocco. As of the 2004 census, it has a population of 7,751.
