= Safi Province =

Province in Marrakesh-Safi, Morocco

Coordinates: 32.300483°N 9.239159°W

Safi Province إقليم آسفي ⵜⴰⵙⴳⴰ ⵏ ⵓⵙⴼⵉ
- Province
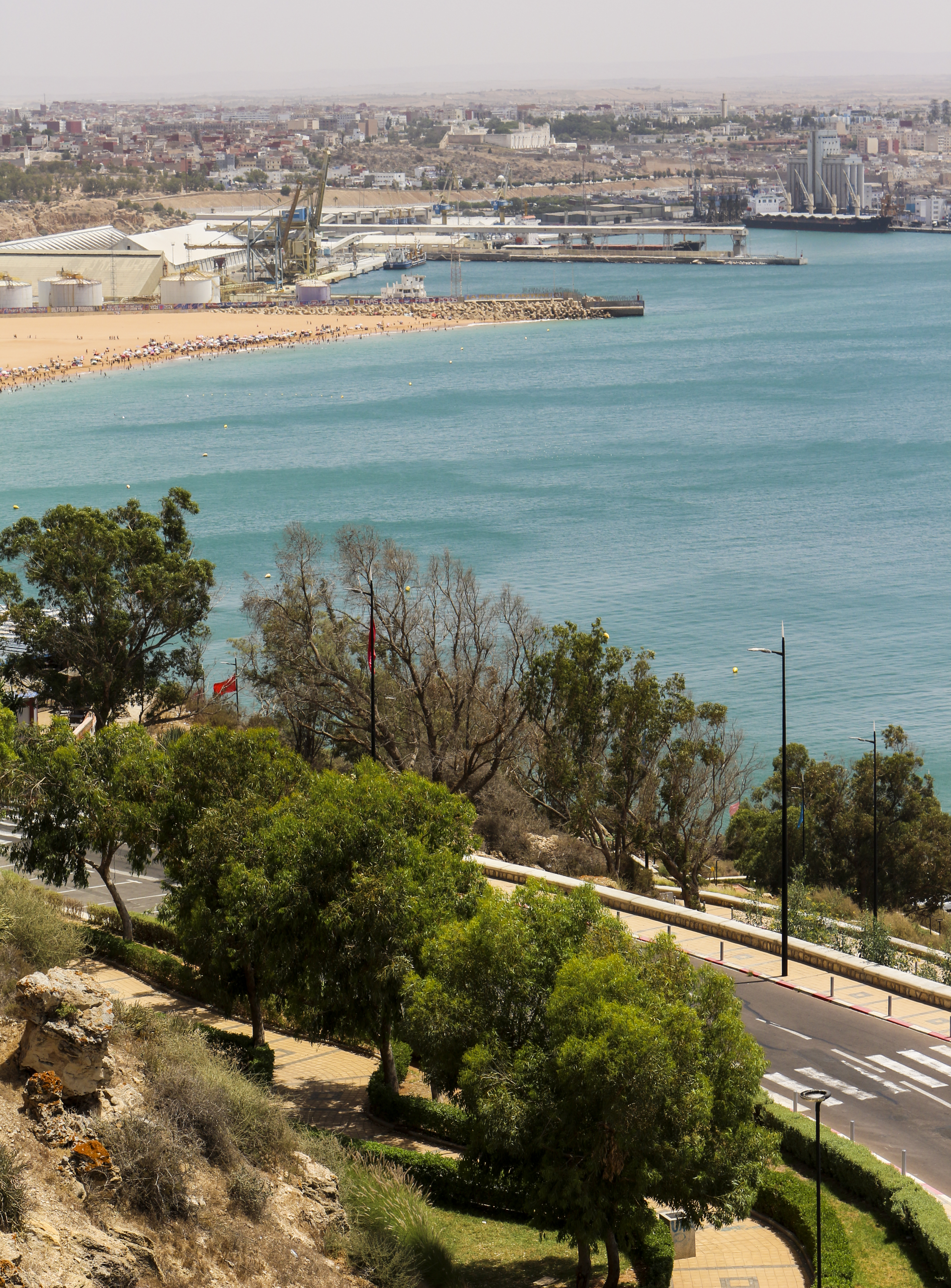
- the city of Safi

- Flag
- Interactive map of Safi Province
- Country: Morocco
- Region: Marrakech-Safi
- Seat: Safi

Safi Province (Arabic: آسفي, romanized: asfī; Standard Moroccan Tamazight: ⴰⵙⴼⵉ, romanized: asfi) is a province of Morocco, in the region of Marrakesh–Safi. The province takes its name from its capital Safi. Its population in 2024 is 719,299.

The major cities and towns are:

- Jamaat Shaim
- Safi
- Sebt Gzoula
- Souira Guedima

== Subdivisions ==
The province is divided administratively into the following:

Name	Geographic code	Type	Households	Population (2004)	Foreign population	Moroccan population	Notes
Safi	431.01.03.	Municipality	59242	284750	179	284571	
Jamaat Shaim	431.01.09.	Municipality	2830	15325	2	15323	
Sebt Gzoula	431.01.11.	Municipality	2796	13943	0	13943	
Bouguedra	431.03.01.	Rural commune	3582	21700	0	21700	1558 residents live in the center, called Bouguedra; 20142 residents live in rural areas.
El Gouraani	431.03.03.	Rural commune	1762	11278	0	11278	
Labkhati	431.03.05.	Rural commune	2340	14279	9	14270	
Lahdar	431.03.07.	Rural commune	2052	12945	0	12945	
Lamrasla	431.03.09.	Rural commune	2688	16812	0	16812	
Lamsabih	431.03.11.	Rural commune	1756	11393	0	11393	
Sidi Aissa	431.03.13.	Rural commune	1616	9719	0	9719	
Sidi Ettiji	431.03.15.	Rural commune	2410	15686	0	15686	
Atouabet	431.07.01.	Rural commune	1901	10841	2	10839	
El Ghiate	431.07.03.	Rural commune	4305	25502	0	25502	
Khatazakane	431.07.05.	Rural commune	2609	15016	0	15016	
Laamamra	431.07.07.	Rural commune	1940	12107	0	12107	
Lamaachate	431.07.09.	Rural commune	2415	13892	0	13892	
Nagga	431.07.11.	Rural commune	3534	20797	0	20797	
Oulad Salmane	431.07.13.	Rural commune	2856	16780	0	16780	
Saadla	431.07.15.	Rural commune	2452	14988	2	14986	
Ayir	431.09.01.	Rural commune	3773	24176	0	24176	3116 residents live in the center, called Laâkarta; 21060 residents live in rural areas.
Dar Si Aissa	431.09.03.	Rural commune	1870	11249	0	11249	
El Beddouza	431.09.05.	Rural commune	1900	12160	1	12159	
Hrara	431.09.07.	Rural commune	3868	23711	1	23710	1028 residents live in the center, called Hrara; 22683 residents live in rural areas.
Moul El Bergui	431.09.09.	Rural commune	2495	14354	0	14354	
