= Youssoufia Province =

Coordinates: 32.2500°N 8.5167°W

Youssoufia Province إقليم اليوسفية
- Province
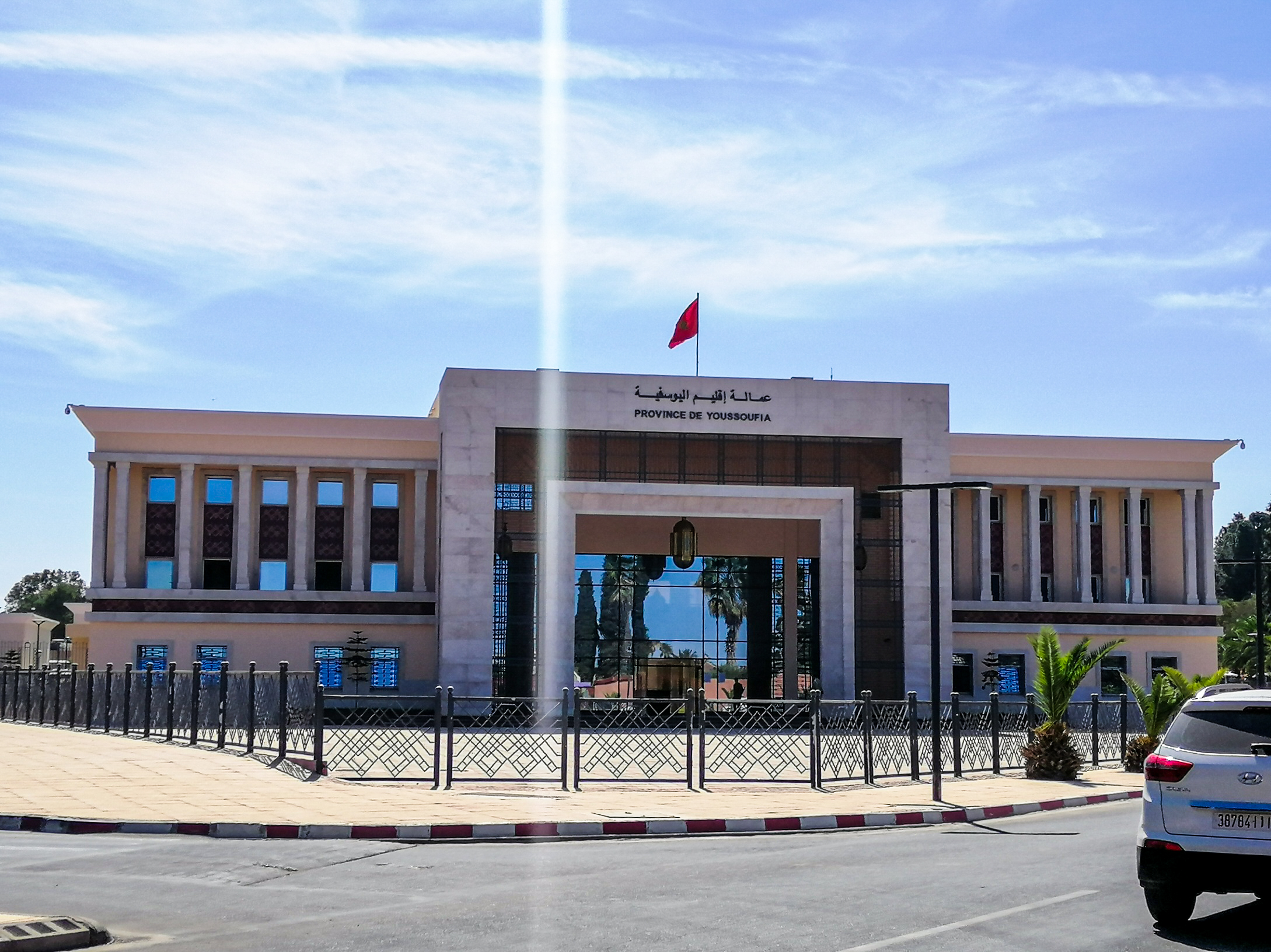
- Province seat
- Interactive map of Youssoufia Province
- Country: Morocco
- Region: Marrakesh-Safi
- Capital: Youssoufia

Area
  - Total: 3,000 km^{2} (1,200 sq mi)

Population (2014)
  - Total: 246,098

Youssoufia Province (Arabic: إقليم اليوسفية) is a province of Morocco in the Marrakesh-Safi Region. The province had a population of 246,098 people in 2024.

The main cities are:

- Youssoufia
- Echemmaia

== Administrative divisions ==
Name	Geographic code	Type	Households	Population (2004)	Foreign population	Moroccan population	Notes
Youssoufia	431.01.13.	Municipality	12528	64518	12	64506	
Echemmaia	431.01.07.	Municipality	4024	21859	4	21855	
Atiamim	431.05.01.	Rural commune	1043	6427	0	6427	
El Gantour	431.05.03.	Rural commune	3351	18893	3	18890	7751 residents live in the center, called Sidi Ahmed; 11142 residents live in rural areas.
Esbiaat	431.05.05.	Rural commune	2261	14449	0	14449	
Ighoud	431.05.07.	Rural commune	3097	21715	0	21715	1475 residents live in the center, called Ighoud; 20240 residents live in rural areas.
Jdour	431.05.09.	Rural commune	2918	19251	0	19251	
Jnane Bouih	431.05.11.	Rural commune	2525	17644	1	17643	
Lakhoualqa	431.05.13.	Rural commune	2205	15915	2	15913	
Ras El Ain	431.05.15.	Rural commune	2623	18224	0	18224	
Sidi Chiker	431.05.17.	Rural commune	2448	18709	0	18709	

== Clubs Sports Province ==
- Club Olympique Hmar de Echemaia
- Mouloudia Club Lakouablia de Lakouablia Msabih Talaa
- Olympic Club Youssoufia
