= Ighoud =

Coordinates: 31.8586°N 8.88417°W

- Town
- Interactive map of Ighoud
- Country: Morocco
- Region: Marrakesh-Safi
- Province: Youssoufia

Population (2024)
  - Total: 2,180
- Time zone: UTC+0 (GMT)

Ighoud (Berber languages: ⵉⵖⵓⴷ, romanized: Iɣud) is a town in Youssoufia Province, Marrakesh-Safi, Morocco. According to the 2004 census it has a population of 1475.
