= Sidi Ali Ben Hamdouche =

Sidi Ali Ben Hamdouche سيدي علي بن حمدوش
- Rural commune and town
- Location within Morocco
- Coordinates: 33.2862°N 8.3264°W
- Country: Morocco
- Region: Casablanca-Settat
- Province: El Jadida

Population (2004)
  - Total: 28,685
- Time zone: UTC+0 (GMT)

Sidi Ali Ben Hamdouche is a small town and rural commune in El Jadida Province of the Casablanca-Settat region of Morocco. At the time of the 2004 census, the commune had a total population of 28,685 people living in 5158 households.
