= El Jadida Province =

Province of Morocco

Coordinates: 33°14′N 8°30′W

El Jadida Province إقليم الجديدة
- Province
- The Kasbah Boulaouane and the Oum Er-Rbia River
- Interactive map of El Jadida Province
- Country: Morocco
- Region: Casablanca-Settat
- Seat: El Jadida

El Jadida Province (Arabic: الجديدة) is a province of Morocco, located in the region of Casablanca-Settat. The province takes its name from the chief city of El Jadida. Its population in 2024 was 912,835.

The major cities are:

- El Jadida
- Azemmour

== History ==
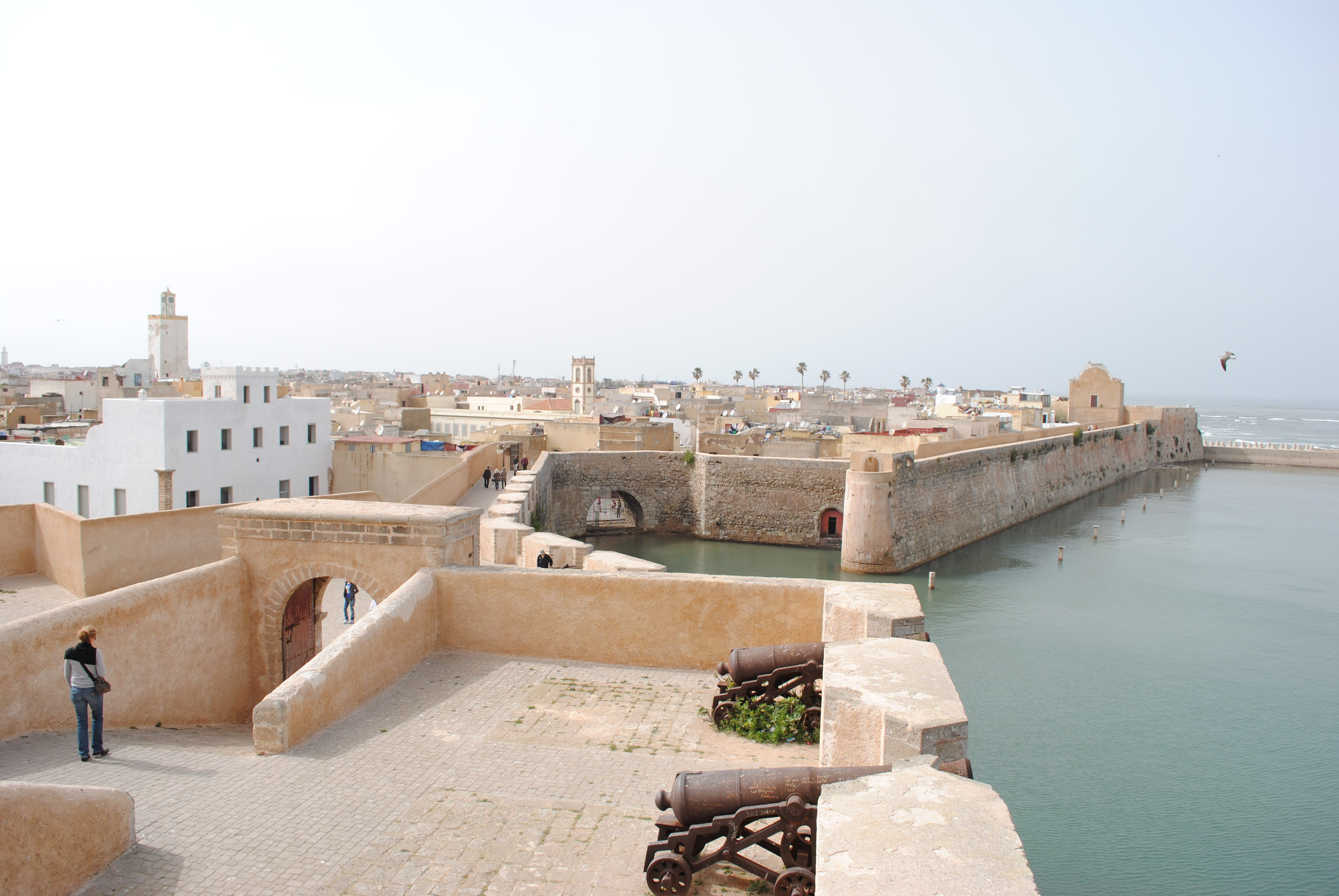
The Forteress of El Jadida

The El Jadida province was created on 10 July 1967.

== Demography ==
2014	2024
786,716	912,835

== Tourism ==
The area of El Jadida has 150 km of coast and several beaches are tourist destinations, the most famous being Sidi Bouzid (Moulay Abdallah Amghar).

The most famous beaches are:

- Deauville (In the centre of El Jadida)
- Al Haouzia (2 kms north)
- Sidi Bouzid (3 kms south)

Sidi Bouzid is a seaside resort, bordering El Jadida. It attracts thousands of holiday makers each year.

Every year in summer, the Mawsim of Moulay Abdallah Amghar is held.

== Subdivisions ==
The province is divided administratively into the following:

Name	Geographic code	Type	Households	Population (2004)	Foreign population	Moroccan population	Notes
Azemmour	181.01.01.	Municipality	8080	36722	26	36696	
El Jadida	181.01.03.	Municipality	31602	144440	384	144056	
Lbir Jdid	181.01.05.	Municipality	3091	15267	14	15253	
Chtouka	181.03.01.	Rural commune	4541	28939	3	28936	
Haouzia	181.03.03.	Rural commune	5989	34607	14	34593	
Laghdira	181.03.05.	Rural commune	2630	16879	12	16867	
Lamharza Essahel	181.03.07.	Rural commune	2766	15938	0	15938	
Oulad Rahmoune	181.03.09.	Rural commune	3414	20239	0	20239	
Sidi Ali Ben Hamdouche	181.03.11.	Rural commune	5158	28685	7	28678	3597 residents live in the center, called Sidi Ali Ban Hamdou; 25088 residents live in rural areas.
Moulay Abdallah Amghar	181.05.01.	Rural commune	8909	45780	28	45752	6482 residents live in the center called Moulay Abdallah, 3889 residents live in the center called Oulad Ghadbane, and 981 residents live in the center called Sidi Bouzid; 34428 residents live in rural areas.
Oulad Aissa	181.05.03.	Rural commune	3430	21779	0	21779	
Oulad Ghanem	181.05.05.	Rural commune	3438	22342	0	22342	
Oulad Hcine	181.05.07.	Rural commune	4626	27475	0	27475	
Sidi Abed	181.05.09.	Rural commune	3627	20854	0	20854	
Sidi M'Hamed Akhdim	181.05.11.	Rural commune	1680	10745	0	10745	
Boulaouane	181.09.01.	Rural commune	2319	14404	0	14404	
Chaibate	181.09.03.	Rural commune	1738	9590	1	9589	
Mettouh	181.09.05.	Rural commune	4228	25587	1	25586	
Mogress	181.09.07.	Rural commune	2380	15050	0	15050	
Oulad Hamdane	181.09.09.	Rural commune	2749	15205	0	15205	
Oulad Sidi Ali Ben Youssef	181.09.11.	Rural commune	1783	10854	1	10853	
Oulad Frej	181.09.13.	Rural commune	3411	17047	2	17045	10387 residents live in the center, called Oulad Frej; 6660 residents live in rural areas.
Sebt Saiss	181.09.15.	Rural commune	1949	11212	0	11212	
Si Hsaien Ben Abderrahmane	181.09.17.	Rural commune	1155	6507	0	6507	
Sidi Smail	181.09.19.	Rural commune	4264	24569	2	24567	4244 residents live in the center, called Sidi Smaïl; 20325 residents live in rural areas.
Zaouiat Saiss	181.09.21.	Rural commune	1526	9519	0	9519	
Zaouiat Lakouacem	181.09.23.	Rural commune	2153	12726	4	12722	

== Sources ==
Province of El Jadida on the site of World Gazetter, by Stefan Helders
