= Bouguedra =

- Town
- Location in Morocco
- Coordinates: 32.2667°N 8.98333°W
- Country: Morocco
- Region: Marrakesh-Safi
- Province: Safi

Population (2004)
  - Total: 1,558
- Time zone: UTC+0 (GMT)

Bouguedra (Arabic: بوكدرة, būkadraẗ, Moroccan Arabic: بوݣدرة) is a town in Safi Province, Marrakesh-Safi, Morocco. According to the 2004 census it has a population of 1558.
