= Oulad Rahmoune =

Oulad Rahmoune أولاد رحمون
- Rural commune and town
- Interactive map of Oulad Rahmoune
- Coordinates: 33.2499°N 8.3346°W
- Country: Morocco
- Region: Casablanca-Settat
- Province: El Jadida

Population (2004)
  - Total: 20,239
- Time zone: UTC+0 (GMT)

Oulad Rahmoune is a small town and rural commune in El Jadida Province of the Casablanca-Settat region of Morocco. At the time of the 2004 census, the commune had a total population of 20,239 people living in 3414 households.
