= Aganane Formation =

Geologic formation in Azilal Province, central Morocco

- Stratigraphic range: Pliensbachian; ~192–184 Ma
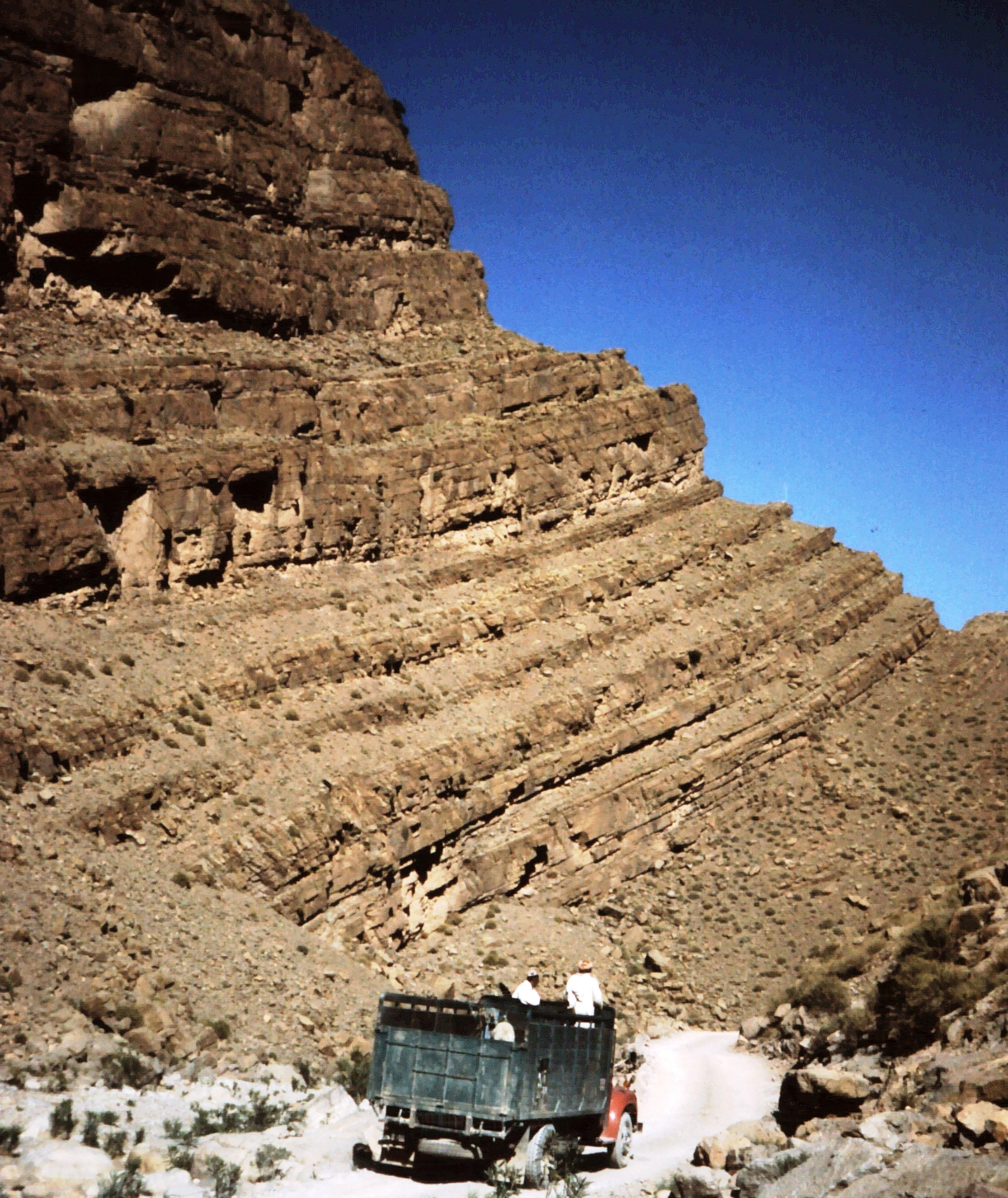
- Exposed lagoonal sequences of the Aganane Formation in South Todhra
- Type: Geological formation
- Unit of: High Atlas
- Sub-units: Informal Ag1 to Ag3
- Underlies: Ait Athmane Formation; Azilal Formation; Amezraï Formation; Tagoudite Formation
- Overlies: Jbel Rat Formation; Imi-n-Ifri Formation; Imouzzer Formation; Talmest-Tazoult Formation
- Area: Central High Atlas
- Thickness: 600 m

Lithology
- Primary: Limestone, dolomite
- Other: Sandstones, Claystone, Shale, Conglomerate

Location
- Coordinates: 31.6°N 6.4°W
- Approximate paleocoordinates: 25.9°N 4.3°W
- Region: Central High Atlas; Middle Atlas
- Country: Morocco

Type section
- Named for: Aganane Village, near Tizouggaghiyn
- Aganane Formation (Morocco)

The Aganane Formation is a Pliensbachian (Early Jurassic), with some levels being potentially Latest Sinemurian, geologic formation in the Khenifra, Midelt, Azilal, Béni-Mellal, Ouarzazate, Tinerhir and Errachidia areas, in the Middle and High Atlas of Morocco, being the remnant of a local massive Carbonate platform, and known mostly for its rich tracksites (up to 1350 tracks in 1988) including footprints of dinosaurs. Is (in part) coeval with the Calcaires du Bou Dahar. This unit is known by other multiple synonymous names such as Aït Chitachen, Aït Bazzi, Aghbalou or Assemsouk Formation in the High Atlas and Calcaires de Tizi Nehassa in the Middle Atlas.

This formation has been dated to the Pliensbachian stage of the Lower Jurassic, thanks to the find of the ammonite Arieticeras cf. algovianum, indicator of Middle Domerian (=Uppermost Pliensbachian) in the upper zone, and lower delimitation by the foraminifers Mayncina termieri and Orbitopsella praecursor (indicators of Lower Pliensbachian age).

The Aganane Formation starts at the W sequences referred to either the synonyms "Aït Chitachen/Aït Bazzi" Formations at sectors such as Demnate or Telouet (continental-fluvial, coastal lagoon) and Azilal area. At Tazoult, part of the Azilal profile contacts the bottom with the karst Talmest-Tazoult Formation, then a section where the Aganane itself indicates an eastward expansion of the carbonate facies, finally, a westward advance of the Imilchil pelagic facies, mostly part of the Jbel Choucht Formation or Ouchbis Formation.

== Lithology ==
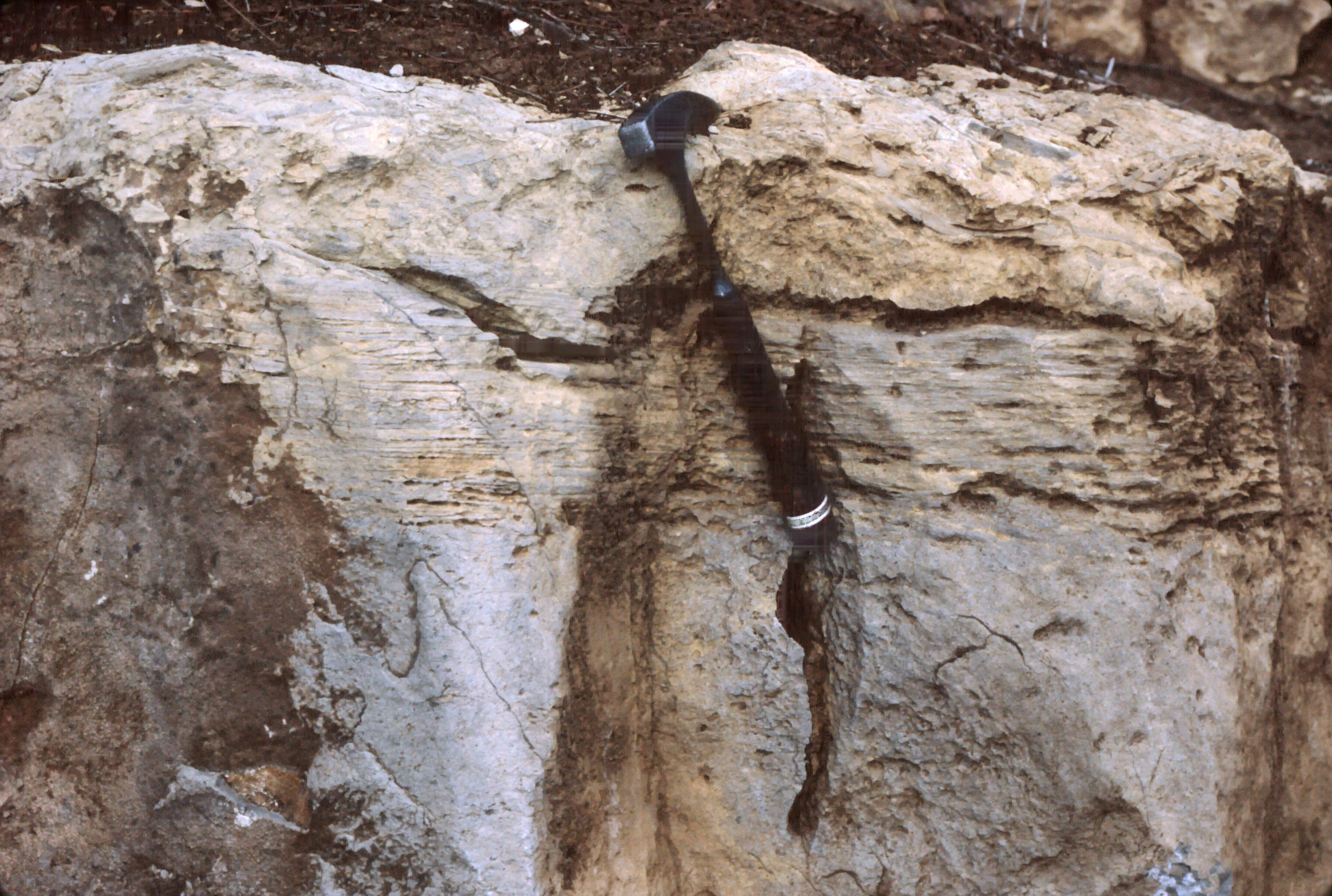
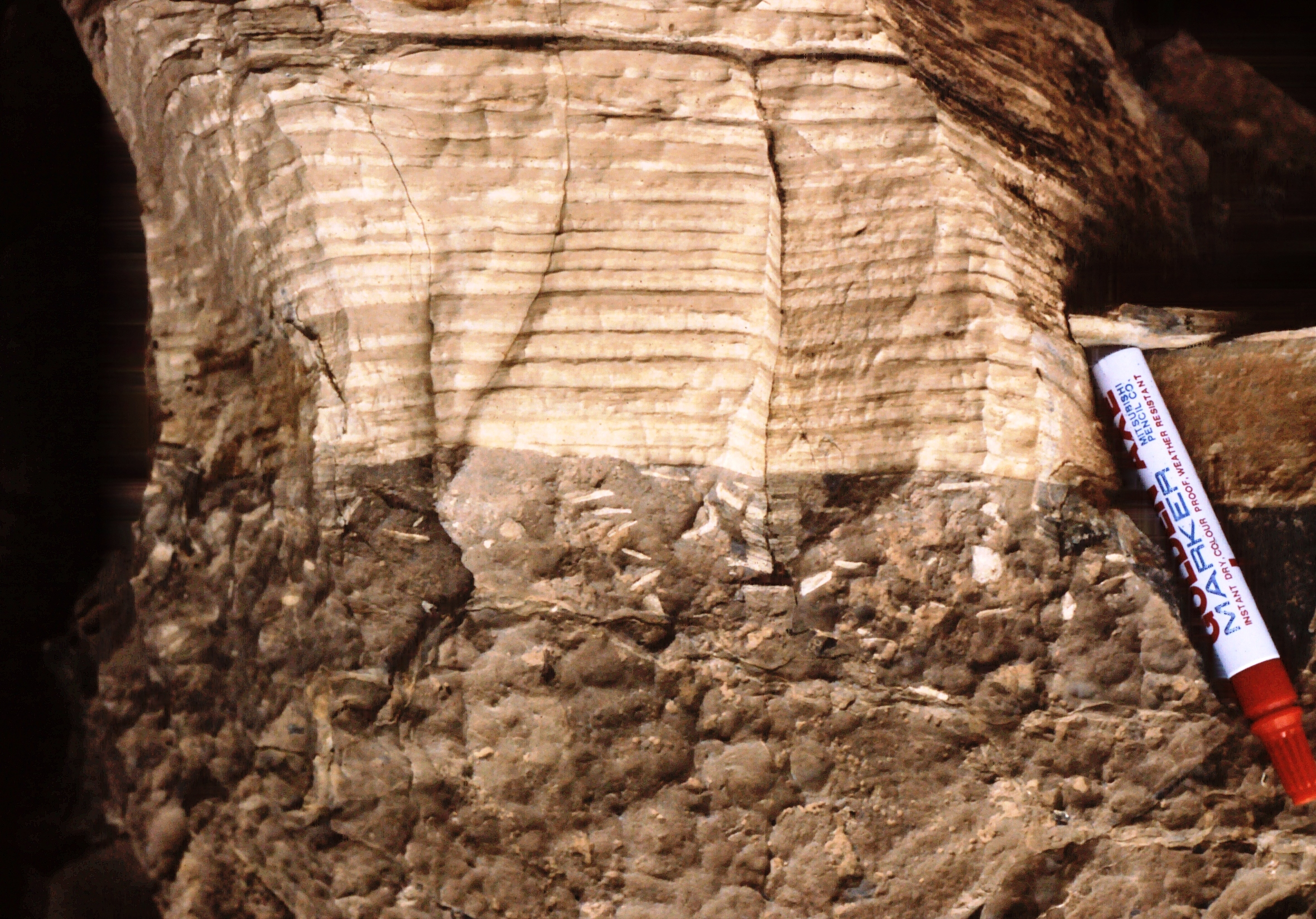
A) Shallowing upward sequence with lower lagoonal marine, then intertidal algal laminations and top cycle an hurricane breccia in a dolomitic matrix; B) Metric emersive cycle with deposition of marine lagoon then dolomitized algal laminations in intertidal to supratidal environment.

The Aganane Formation is a thick carbonate sequence, up to 600 m, stratigraphically positioned between the Imi-n-Ifri Formation (dolomites and limestones) and the Tafraout Group (red sandstones and pelites). Its boundaries are mostly transitional, though local erosional discordances occur.

Lithologies vary across the basin. In the SW (Demnate area), facies include brecciated dolomites with gypsum lenses, cavernous dolomites, red marls, and basal sandstone-pelitic layers with rhizoliths, indicating episodes of desiccation. Towards Azilal, the unit is dominated by cyclic dolomitic and calcareous beds, with interbedded marls and fossil-rich limestones, organized into three subunits reflecting successive marine to emergent phases. At Zaouiat Ahansal and Aït Bouguemez the formation comprises three successive units, Ag1 to Ag3, with varying development and thickness. Ag1 features rhythmic fine limestones with foraminifera, laminated and marly dolomites, plus red marls and fossil-rich layers evolving from mudstones to oolitic grainstones capped by oxidized discontinuities. Ag2, often azoic marno-dolomitic ("Aït Bazzi Formation"), starts in proximal setting with red marls and thick paleosols (8-10 m), yellow marls with brecciated dolomites, or chaotic dolomitic megabreccias and slumps (15-20 m), while in distal mirrors this lithology of Ag1 but spanning packstones to biomicrites with algae and oncoliths. Ag3, above emersion surfaces, mirrors Ag1 but emphasizes biodetritic packstones to biomicrites with algae, foraminifera, thick fossiliferous limestones transitioning to detrital conglomerates with Dinosaur footprints and tectonic cracks at top. Around the Goulmima fault, thick evaporitic successions (gypsum and anhydrite) developed in subsiding sebkhas ("Aghbalou formation"), later redefined as specific facies of this formation.

Characteristic features include stromatolitic dolomites, diverse microfacies (mudstones, packstones, grainstones, biomicrites), biostromes with large bivalves, intraformational megabreccias, and cyclic deposits with siliceous nodules. Sedimentary structures such as Stromatolites, Teepee-like features, and desiccation cracks indicate repeated emergence, supporting the interpretation of a dynamic coastal to intertidal depositional system.

== Environments ==
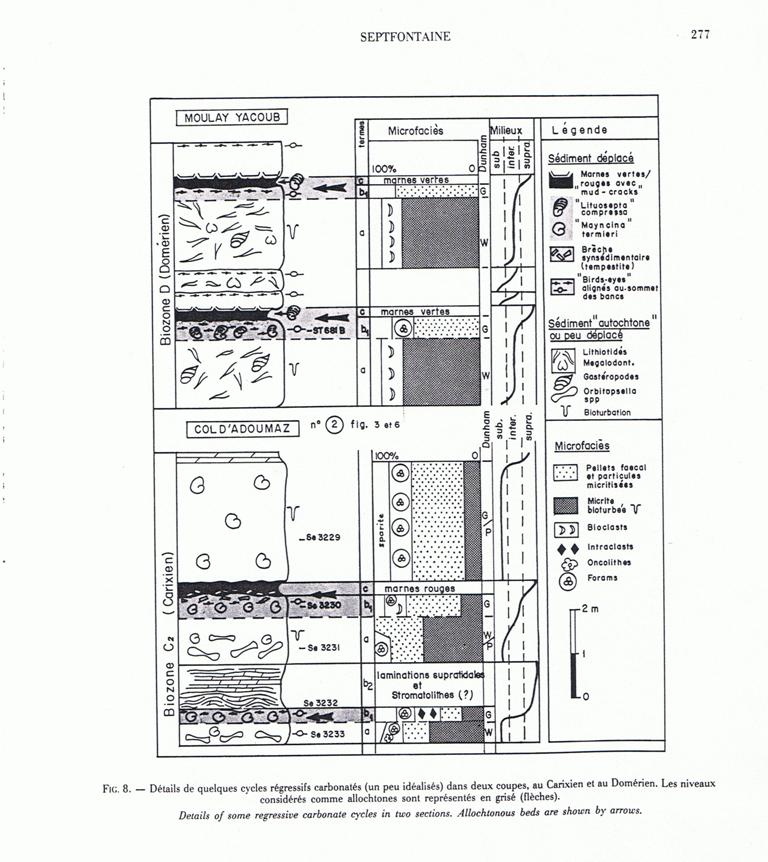
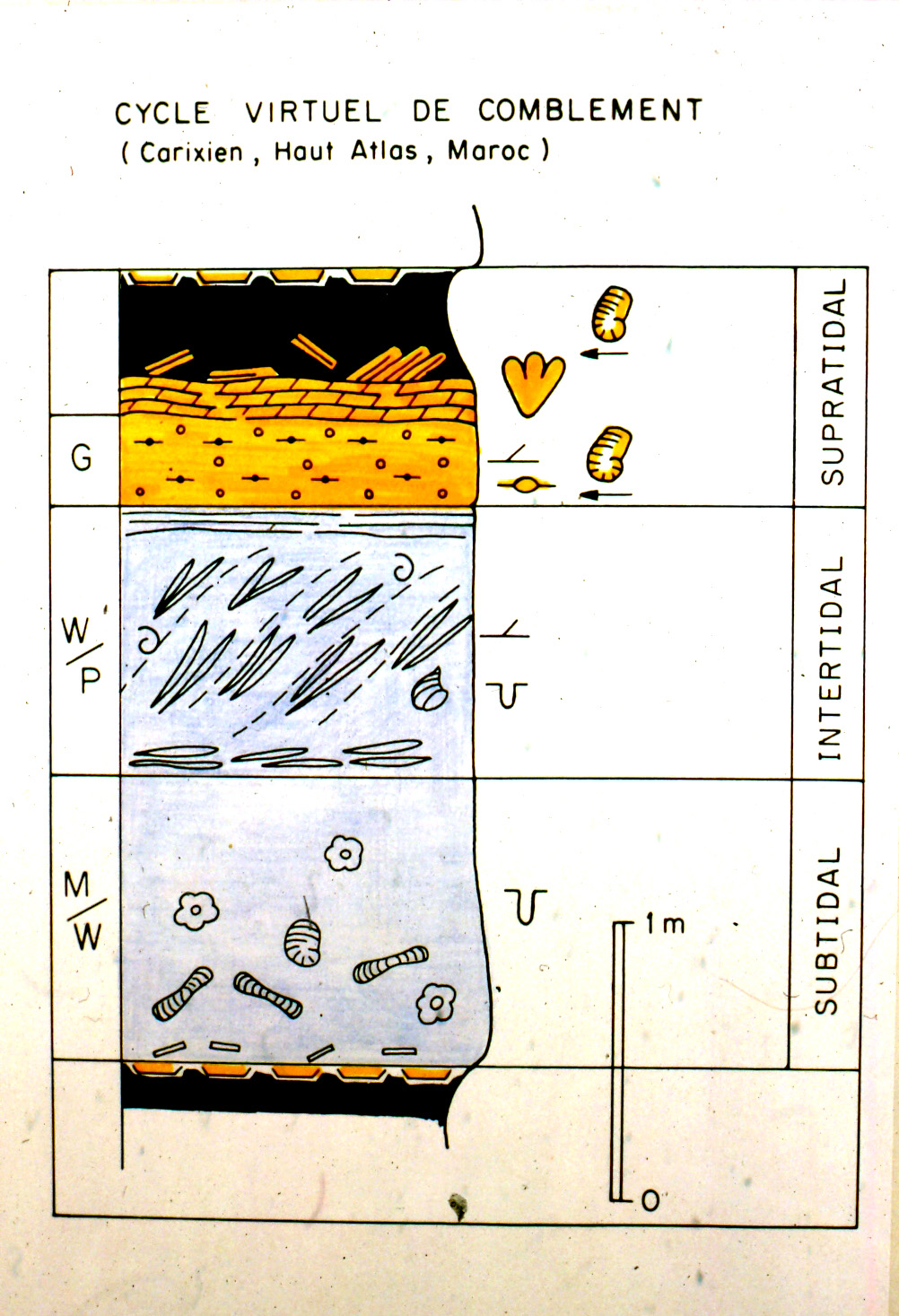
A) Metre-scale peritidal sedimentary cycles in two outcrops 230 km apart, with storm beds and possibly tsunamites include abundant reworked foraminifera. B) Virtual metric "shallowing upward sequence" observed all along (more than 10,000 km) the south Tethyan margin

The Aganane Formation represents a photozoan-dominated large carbonate platform, formed in a warm, semi-arid to arid climate, were clear, nutrient-poor waters, while ooids, evaporites and calcretes indicate high evaporation and limited freshwater input, and diagenetic features even reflect major events such as Hurricanes. The formation displays marked west–east variations: red marly brackish deposits grade into evaporitic lagoonal, then into marly–dolomitic and marly–calcareous lagoonal–marine facies.

The supratidal sector is diverse, including quartz-rich continental deposits, fluvial channels, and thick gypsum–cargneule successions, along with dolomitic shales and marls containing desiccation cracks, caliche crusts, and pisoliths. The surrounding low-lying hinterland experienced little runoff and was primarily eroded by wind. These indicate a continental zone bordering river systems, grading into coastal sabkhas where shales, siltstones, and interstitial evaporites accumulated. North of the Demnate fault, a broad subsiding tidal flat developed, where carbonate deposits with gypsum relics and stromatolitic laminites formed, interspersed with desiccation cracks and gypsum precipitated in sebkhas. Along this fault, massive lignite layers appear, probably derived from degraded forests to the south, as indicated by root traces in basal sandstones near Aït Tioutline. Herbivorous and carnivorous dinosaurs also inhabited these coastal marshlands.

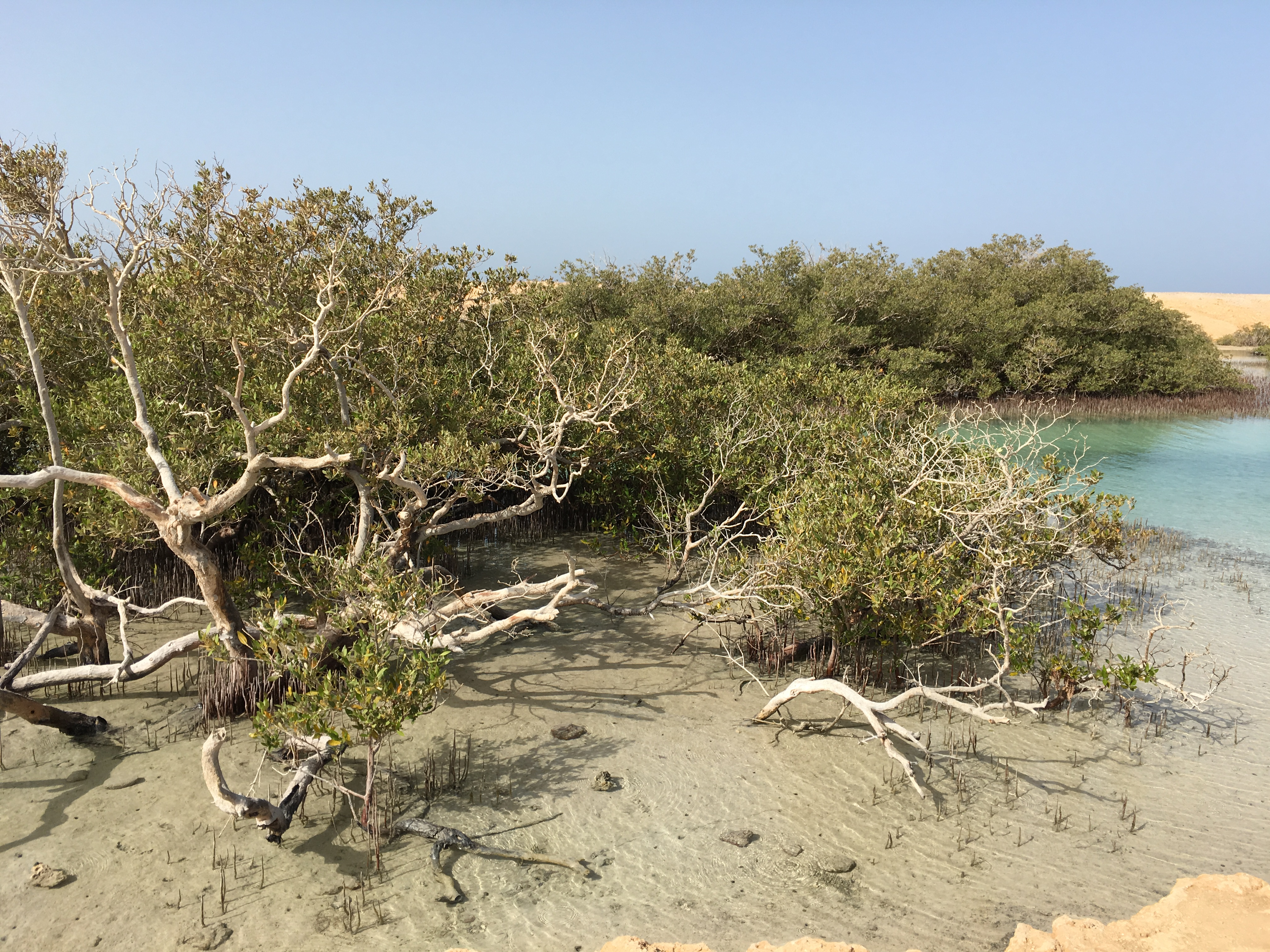
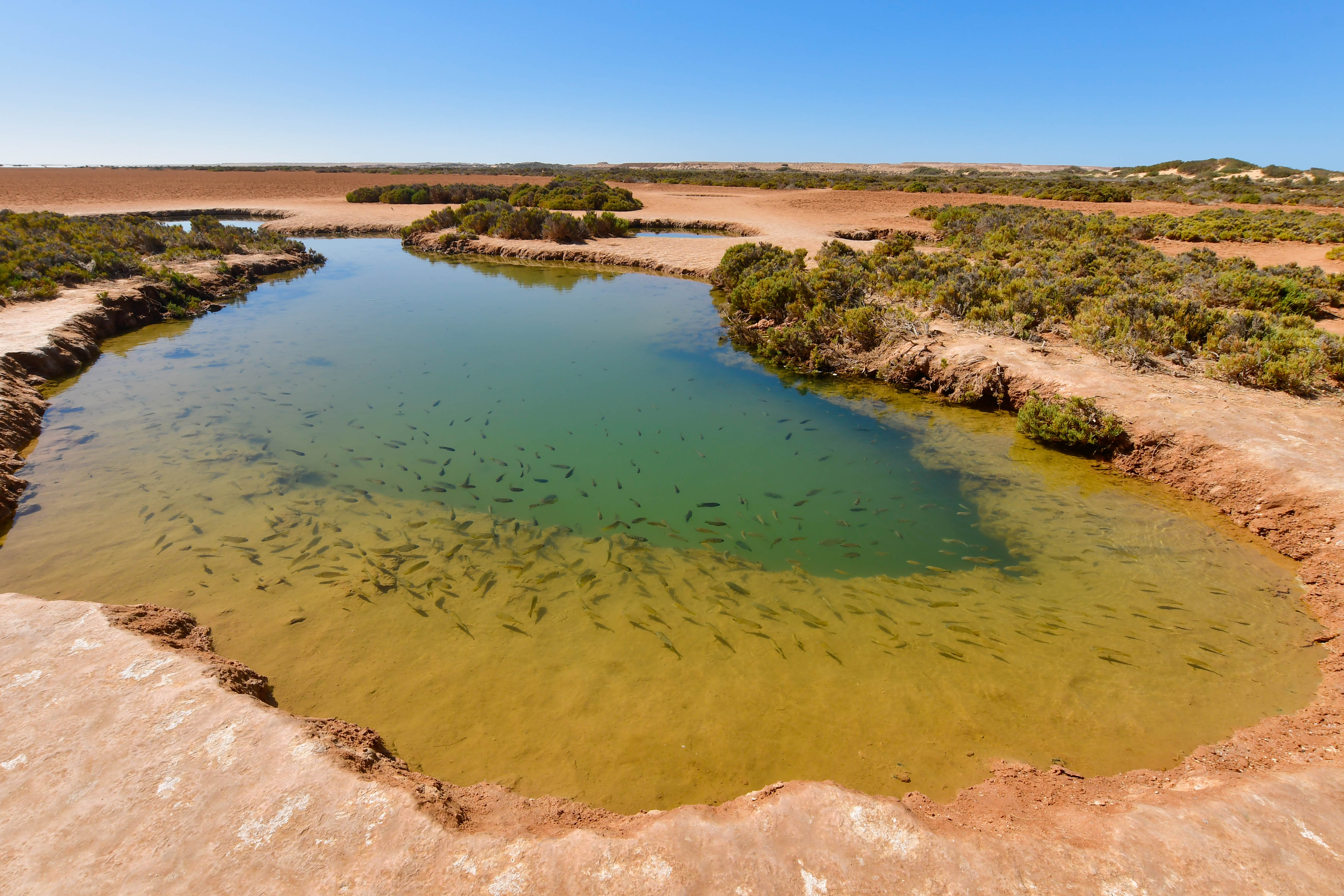
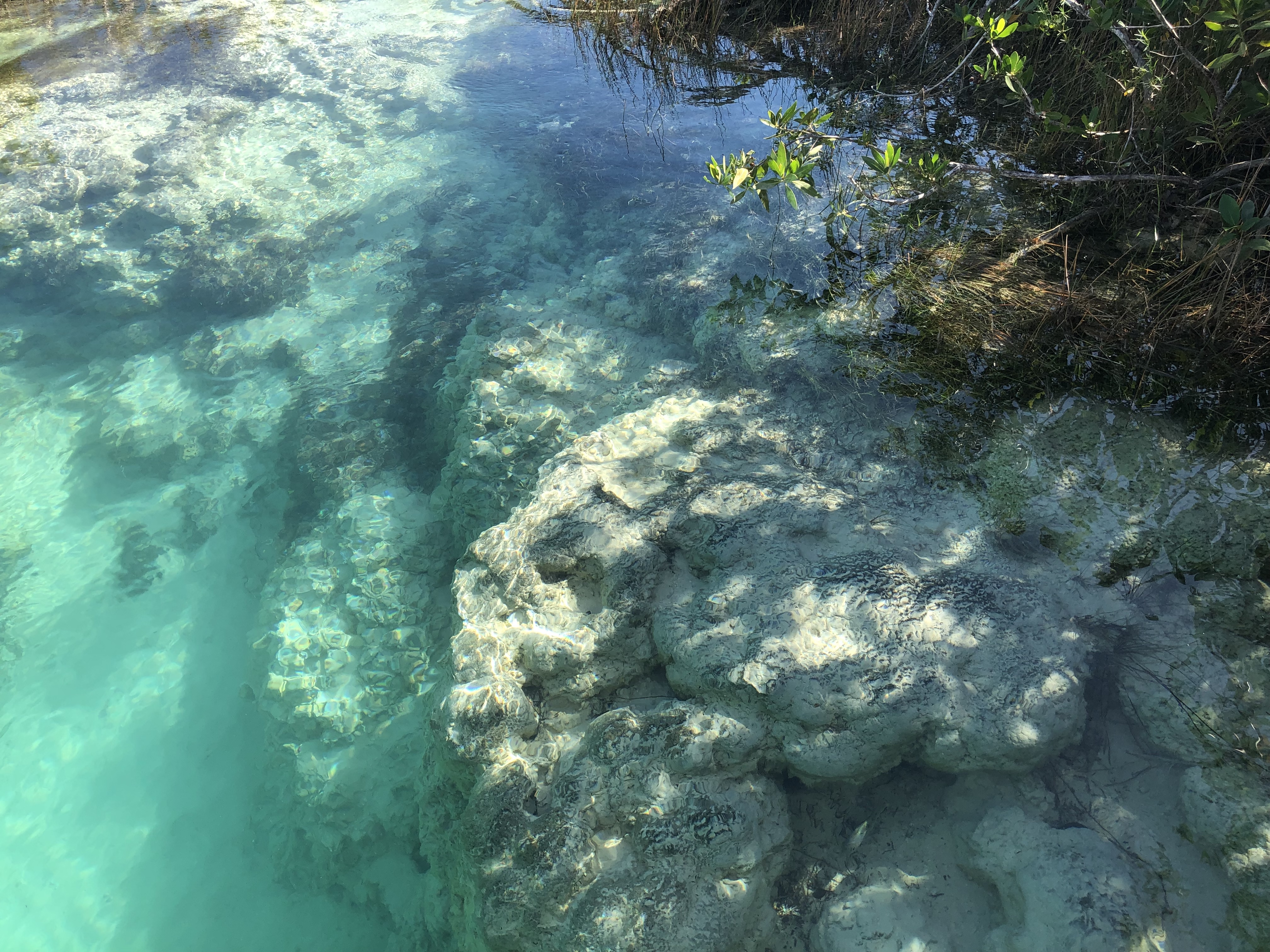
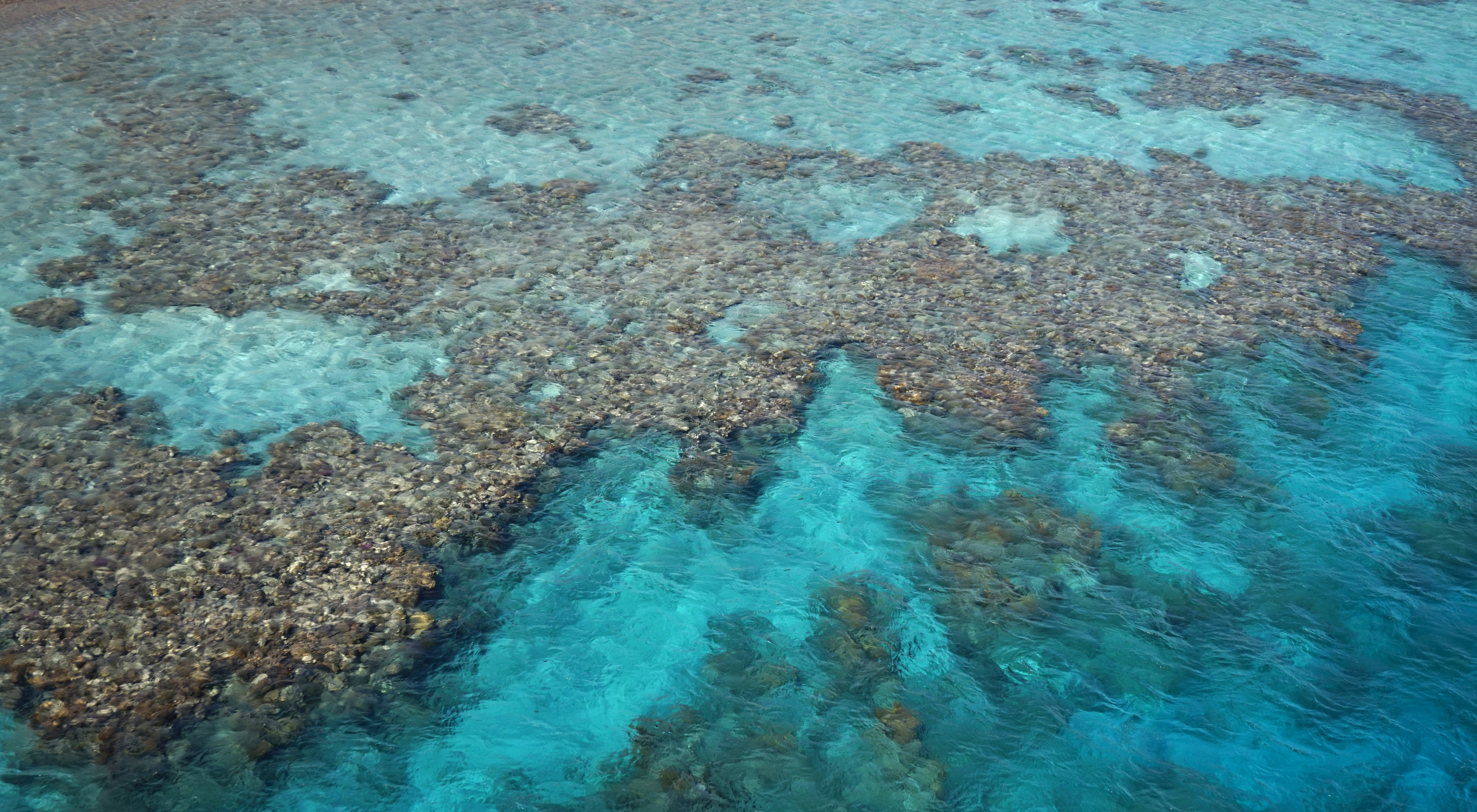
The Aganane Fm records varied carbonate platform environments: supratidal paleosols (ex. Red Sea mangroves), coastal sabkhas (Imlily, near Dakhla), mangrove-like intertidal settings with stromatolites (ex. Lake Bacalar), and shallow marine microbialite–coral associations (ex. Red Sea).

In the intertidal zone, pelletoid lime packstones and wackestones likely formed in tidal flats, comparable to present-day mangrove belts, often bioturbated, indicate shallow low-energy conditions with variable terrigenous input, rich in fenestral fabrics and bivalves, storm redistributed sediments and bivalve-rich mudstones that represent brackish–lagoonal settings, cross-bedded grainstones from high-energy tidal bars, crinoid and mollusc-rich packstones from quieter shoal environments and Algal laminated boundstones developed in both supratidal and intertidal zones, similar to modern Shark Bay and the Persian Gulf. The Reef facies featured a nearshore, tropical setting, with dominant Plicatostylidae bivalves and co-existing scleractinian corals, possibly photosymbiotic, suggest warm, clear, oligotrophic conditions. Marginal intertidal zones experienced hypersaline conditions, while central and southern areas maintained near-normal marine salinity during transgressions.

Subtidal deposits include lagoonal skeletal packstones, oolitic tidal deltas, offshore bars, oncoliths, and coral reefs. Occasional Opisoma bivalves occur, while farther east flint-bearing calcareous shales with ammonites signal more open-marine conditions.

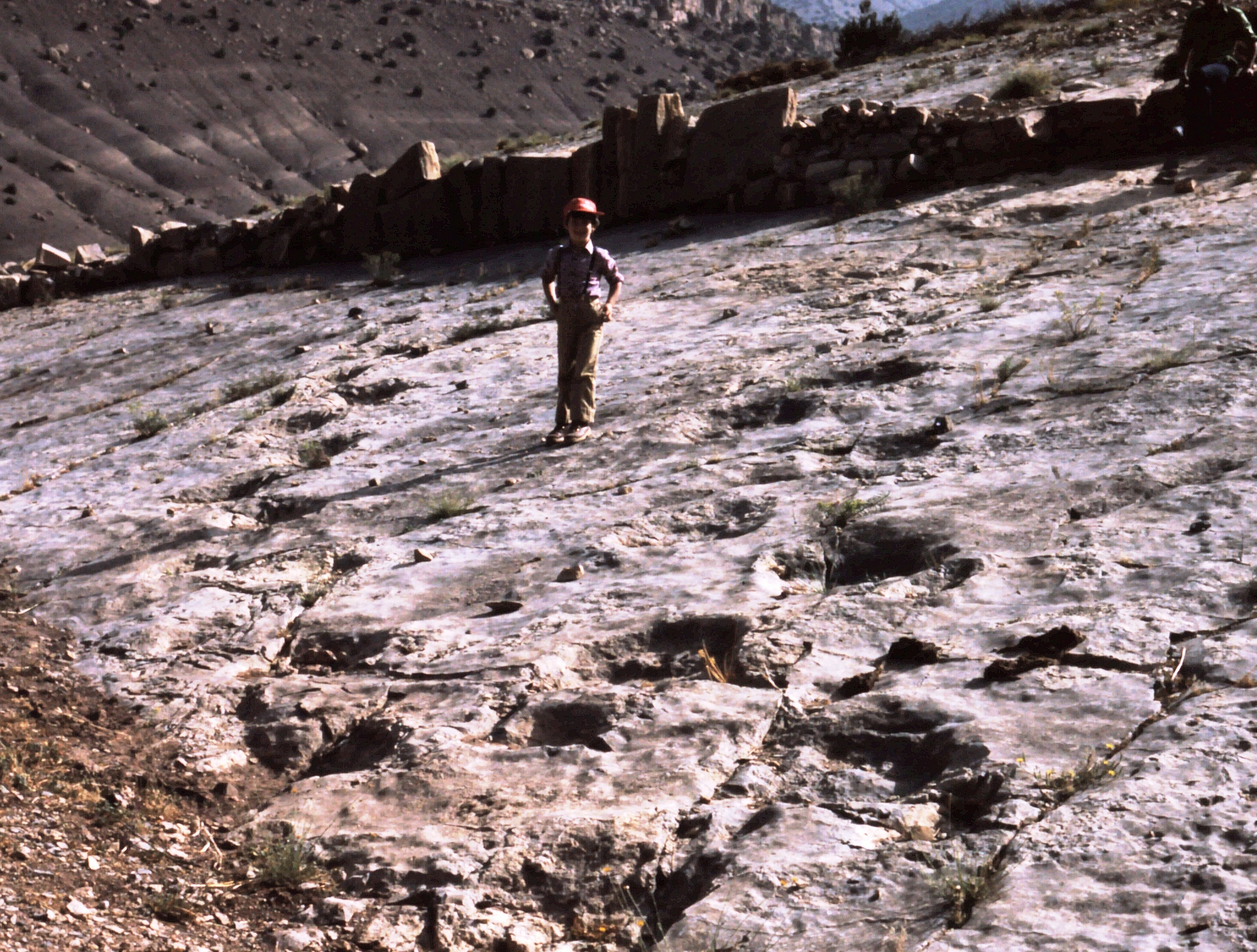
Dinosaur tracks at Tabant

Reefs from show typical Sinemurian–Pliensbachian Plicatostylidae assemblages, locally, from shallow subtidal floatstones to layers with lagoonal marls, red mudstones with root traces, and calcrete, indicating subaerial exposure. The "Assemsouk Structure", a massive bivalve reef (125 m high, 1.25 km long), preserves growth stages with corals and stromatolites, later faulted into a narrow turbiditic trough and buried by marine marls. The depositional environments span from supratidal flats to subtidal zones, with regressive phases marked by barrier islands, followed by anoxic lagoonal shales with coal seams and plant fragments.

=== Depositional settings ===
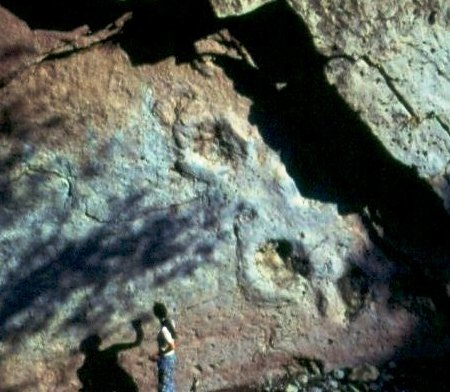
Footprints of a giant Sauropodomorph dinosaur, at the top of an emersive "shallowing upward" carbonate cycle

The Aganane Formation records a spectrum of shallow marine to coastal depositional environments during the Pliensbachian. The lower and middle parts are dominated by light gray, dolomitic limestones with rhythmic layering, representing tidal-flat–like coastal zones periodically inundated by seawater. Localities such as Ait Athmane and Tizi n'Terghist preserve rhizoliths, tree trunks, red clay paleosols, and pisoids, indicative of pedogenic or freshwater conditions with episodic exposure. Other sites show biodetritic limestones with emersion features, including dolomitization, mud cracks, plant remains, and dinosaur footprints. Coastal lagoons and supratidal plains contain cross-bedded clastic carbonates, microbial structures, and evidence of storm-induced deposition. Red and white marls, thin dolomite layers, and evaporites suggest alternating exposure and flooding, reminiscent of modern sabkha environments, with tropical conditions comparable to the Andros Island model in the Bahamas. Intertidal zones intermittently supported salt-tolerant plants, leaving organic seams in low-salinity patches. Sedimentary structures like cross-bedding in oolite and clastic shoals, as well as channel directions, were recorded but showed high variability and no consistent trends, likely due to the complex interplay of tidal currents, islands, promontories, mud mounds, shoals, and storm influences in this tidally dominated environment.

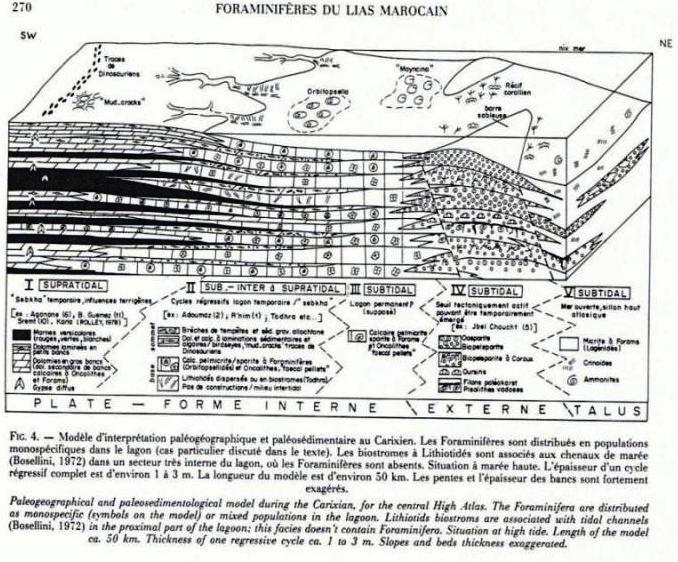
Depositional environments and associated foraminifera of the Aganane Formation

Further offshore, the platform transitions to more open lagoons dominated by shallow marine conditions. Sediments include mud-rich limestones and dark biodetrital limestones, with marine fauna such as lamellibranchs, gastropods, brachiopods, calcareous algae, oncoliths and Foraminifers. Large bivalves like Plicatostylidae, form shell beds shaped by tidal currents. Gray, organic-rich sediments indicate low-oxygen, calm-water deposition, with subtidal oncolitic lime wackestones reflecting occasional higher-energy mixing.

In wave-exposed zones, sediments coarsen and reef-related bioclastic limestones appear, with coral colonies and sea urchins forming patch reefs. These reefs protected inner lagoons, allowing finer sediments to accumulate behind them.

Frequent episodic storms caused repeated reworking and lateral displacement of facies, generating asymmetric cycles 2-4 meters thick in shallow lagoon bottoms and behind offshore bars or reef belts.

== Paleogeography ==
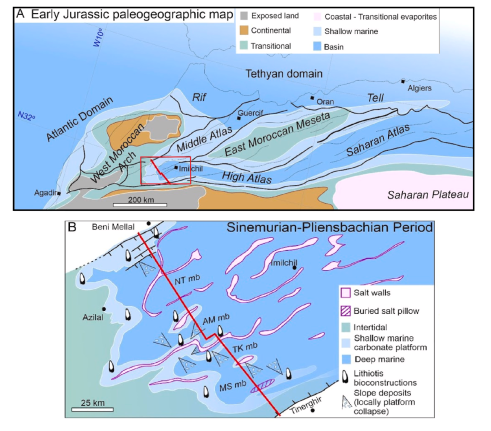
Sinemurian-Pliensbachian Paleogeography of N Africa, with closeup reconstruction of the High Atlas, including the Aganane Fm.

During the Pliensbachian, the region lay at near-tropical latitudes along the western edge of the "Atlas Gulf," facing the Tethys Sea. Deposition was concentrated along the North Atlas Fault, with up to 700 m of carbonates N, while around 200 m S. This fault line probably marked the northern boundary of a Paleozoic basement peninsula that advanced eastward from the Tichka Massif into the Atlas Trench. Pre-existing subsidence controlled deposition in areas like Haute Moulouya, Itzer Facies, Causse d'Ajdir, Amezraï, and Aït Bouguemez.

Paleogeographic evolution can be summarized in three stages:

- Lower Pliensbachian ("Carixian"): tidal flats and subtidal platforms on the southern slopes of the Central High Atlas; Plicatostylidae colonized areas along the NE-SW fault separating the Tilougguite trough from its northwest platform. In the Middle Atlas, a shallow Aganane Formation appeared in the SE, with NE sabkha-like (Imouzzer) and marine Jbel Choucht facies along the Accident, all with strong Tethys inflow NE currents.
- Middle Pliensbachian ("Carixian–Domerian"): marine expansion along the western High Atlas Basin with rhythmic carbonates in the Tilougguit Trench, turbidites on the SE edge of the Beni-Mellal platform, and subsident lagoons in other sectors. Key faults include the Demnate Fault and North Atlas Fault, while the Telouet Graben remained stable.
- Upper Pliensbachian (Upper "Domerian"): contrasted platform conditions with emersion at Demnate, paleosols and karst development, lignite deposits along active faults, carbonate- terrigenous sedimentation in small basins like Tamadout and Taquat N'Agrd, and shoals at Jbel Taguendouft. Central zones deepened near Jbel Azourki-Jbel Aroudane. In the Middle atlas the regression and barrier formation disrupted the marine strait, isolating regions like Causse d'Ajdir and restricting faunal exchange, marking a shift toward more restricted conditions.

Local diapirs remained as low tophography Islands that allowed the proliferation of Plicatostylidae and other organism colonies. At Talmest-Tazoult begins with the deposition of the Jbel Choucht platform, followed by uplift and salt wall growth causing erosion of the karst and deposition of syn-diapiric breccias, conglomerates, and sandstones, and then is invaded from the west by the shallow marine carbonate platform of the Aganane Formation (with small-scale karstic cavities filled with meteoric sediments), with a decrease in the growth rate. The Aganane limestones were later overprinted by modified marine fluids during burial, leading to localized dolomitization under reducing conditions.

== Foraminifera ==
Color key: Taxon / Reclassified taxon / Taxon falsely reported as present / Dubious taxon or junior synonym / Ichnotaxon / Ootaxon / Morphotaxon	Notes; Uncertain or tentative taxa are in small text; ~~crossed out~~ taxa are discredited.

Local Foraminifers have been the major reference to establish the local different environmental settings, as its distribution is clearly based on cyclic sedimentary evolution: the base banks "Term A" represents a shallow subtidal setting with rich thanatocoenosis of Siphovalvulina, Mayncina or Orbitopsella, associated with an intensely bioturbated environment, analogous to present Bahamas, Florida or Persian Gulf. In the Aganane type section limestone beds (biopelmicrite) rich in Orbilopsella, Haurania or Pseudopfenderina could be interpreted as brought by tidal currents covering the supratidal zone. In "Term B" a thanatocoenosis of monospecific Foraminifera with Mayncina termieri, Pseudopfenderina or Lituosepta compressa are common, interpreted as allochthonous, resulting from sorting in an intertidal environment higher than supratidal, under or alternated with the supratidal laminations and the storm breccias, as well in rarer cases covering (aeolian origin?) surface of the supratidal coastal plain. The Aganane Foraminifera in Terms "D" and "E" underwent significant evolutionary and environmental changes. During D, the foraminiferal population was dominated by Planisepta, a smaller morphovariant of Lituosepta, which persisted after the decline of larger orbitopsellids like Orbitopsella due to internal biological factors and mechanical instability related to their large size. The population remained stable until the Middle Domerian anoxic crisis, which triggered a microfaunal turnover. E saw the emergence of smaller, simpler foraminifera such as Haurania gracilis and Paleocyclammina liasica, adapted to eutrophic lagoon conditions.

Genus/Family	Species	Stratigraphic position	Material	Notes	Images
Amijiella	A. amiji	Aït-Abbès; Aghbalou N'Kerdous; Jbel Tarkeddid; Tizi Isli; Tizi Nehassa; Wazzant	Isolated Tests/Shells	Hauraniidae	
Ammobaculites	A. sp.	Jbel Akenzoud; Tizi Nehassa	Isolated Tests/Shells	Ammomarginulininae	
Bosniella	B. oenensis; B. aff. croatica; B. sp.	Aghbalou N'Kerdous; Jbel Akenzoud	Isolated Tests/Shells	Biokovinidae	
Dentalina	D. sp.	Ait Athmane	Isolated Tests/Shells	Nodosariinae	
Duotaxis	D. metula	Aghbalou N'Kerdous	Isolated Tests/Shells	Verneuilinidae	
Eariandia	E. sp.	Aït-Abbès	Isolated Tests/Shells	Earlandiidae	
Eggerella	E. sp.	Tazoult	Isolated Tests/Shells	Eggerellidae	
Everticyclammina	E. praevirguliana; E. sp.	Aganane/Assist; Ait Athmane; Aghbalou N'Kerdous; Barda; Bernai; Jbel Choucht; Tazoult	Isolated Tests/Shells	Everticyclamminidae	
Glomospira	G. sp.	Aït-Abbès; Ait Athmane; Assif Oum; Tizi Isli; Tizi Nehassa	Isolated Tests/Shells	Ammodiscidae.	
Glomospirella	G. sp	Ait Athmane	Isolated Tests/Shells	Ammovertellininae.	
Haurania	H. gracilis; H. deserta	Aït-Abbès; Aghbalou N'Kerdous; Barda; Jbel Choucht; Jbel Tarkeddid; Tazoult; Tizi Isli; Tizi Nehassa; Wazzant	Isolated Tests/Shells	Hauraniidae	
Lituosepta	L. recoarensis; L. compressa	Aganane; Aït Bou Guemmez; Aït Blal; Aghbalou N'Kerdous; Assif Oum; Assist Bernai; Assist Lakhdar; Chaaba Touila; Gorges de Taghia; Gorges du Tisakht; Jbel Asmir; Jbel Choucht; Jbel Rhat; Jbel Tarahalt; Jbel Tarkeddid; Moulay Yacoub; Nit Blal-Tacht; Tadghouit; Wazzant	Isolated Tests/Shells	Mesoendothyridae	
Meandrospira	M. sp.	Barda; Jbel Choucht; Talmest-Tazoult	Isolated Tests/Shells	Cornuspiridae	
Mesoendothyra	M. croatica; M. sp.	Aganane; Aït-Abbès; Aït Blal; Ait Athmane; Assist Bernai; Jbel Choucht; Tazoult; Wazzant	Isolated Tests/Shells	Mesoendothyridae	
Nodosaria	N. sexcostata; N. sp.	Ait Athmane	Isolated Tests/Shells	Nodosariinae.	
Ophtalmidium	O. concentricum; O. martanum; O. sp.	Ait Athmane; Tizi Nehassa	Isolated Tests/Shells	Ophthalmidiidae.	
Orbitopsella	O. primaeva; O. praecursor	Aganane; Aït Blal; Aït Bou Guemmez; Aghbalou N'Kerdous; Assif Bernal; Assif Lakhdar; Assif Imejdag; Col d'Adoumaz; Col du R'nim; Col (Tizi) n-Toudat; Gorges du Makin; Gorges de Taghia; Jbel Choucht; Jbel Mahan; Jbel Rhat; Taclghouit; Jbel Tadaghas; Jbel Tafenfent; Jbel Tarkeddid; Wazzant	Isolated Tests/Shells	Mesoendothyridae	
Paleomayncina	P. termieri	Aganane; Aït Blal; Assist Bernai; Barda; Gorges du Tisakht; Jbel Choucht; Jbel Rhat; Jbel Tarahalt; Jbel Tarkeddid; Tazoult; Wazzant	Isolated Tests/Shells	Mesoendothyridae	
Planisepta	P. compressa	Ait Athmane; Jbel Akenzoud	Isolated Tests/Shells	Mesoendothyridae	
Planiinvoluta	P. carinata	Barda	Isolated Tests/Shells	Cornuspiridae	
Pseudocyclammina	P. liasica	Aït Blal; Barda; Jbel Choucht; Jbel Tarkeddid; Tazoult; Tizi Isli; Tizi Nehassa; Wazzant	Isolated Tests/Shells	Pfenderinidae	
Pseudopfenderina	P. butterlini	Aganane; Aït-Abbès; Aït Blal; Aghbalou N'Kerdous; Assist Bernai; Gorges du Tisakht; Jbel Choucht; Jbel Rhat; Jbel Tarahalt; Jbel Tarkeddid; Wazzant	Isolated Tests/Shells	Pfenderinidae	
Riyadhella	R. praeregularis	Aghbalou N'Kerdous	Isolated Tests/Shells	Chrysalidinidae	
Siphovalvulina	S. colomi; S. gibraltarensis; S. sp.	Aganane; Ait Athmane; Aït-Abbès; Aït Blal; Ait Athmane; Aghbalou N'Kerdous; Assist Bernai; Tizi Isli; Wazzant	Isolated Tests/Shells	Verneuilinidae	
Textulariopsis	T. sinemurensis	Aghbalou N'Kerdous	Isolated Tests/Shells	Textulariopsidae	

== Invertebrates ==
=== Ichnofossils ===
Ichnogenus/Ichnofamily	Species	Stratigraphic position	Material	Made by	Images
Arenicolites	A. ispp.	Aganane; Aït-Abbès; Ait Athmane; Aït Blal; Aït Bou Guemez; Amagour; Assif Bernal; Assif Lakhdar; Assif Imejdag; Col d'Adoumaz; Col du R'nim; Col (Tizi) n-Toudat; Gorges du Makin; Gorges de Taghia; Jbel Choucht; Jbel Ikis; Jbel Mahan; Jbel Rhat; Jbel Taabest; Taclghouit; Jbel Tadaghas; Jbel Tafenfent; Jbel Tarkeddid; Taberhout; Tazergount; Tizi Nehassa; Wazzant	Borrowing Traces	Amphipoda; Carpitellida; Sipuncula; Spionida	Example of Arenicolites specimens
Asterosoma	A. ispp.	Aganane; Aït-Abbès; Ait Athmane; Aït Blal; Aït Bou Guemez; Amagour; Assif Bernal; Assif Lakhdar; Assif Imejdag; Col d'Adoumaz; Col du R'nim; Col (Tizi) n-Toudat; Gorges du Makin; Gorges de Taghia; Jbel Choucht; Jbel Ikis; Jbel Mahan; Jbel Rhat; Jbel Taabest; Taclghouit; Jbel Tadaghas; Jbel Tafenfent; Jbel Tarkeddid; Taberhout; Tazergount; Tizi Nehassa; Wazzant	Bulb-like swelling burrows	Annelids; Sipuncula	
Chomatichnus	C. wegberensis	Aganane; Aït-Abbès; Ait Athmane; Aït Blal; Aït Bou Guemez; Amagour; Assif Bernal; Assif Lakhdar; Assif Imejdag; Col d'Adoumaz; Col du R'nim; Col (Tizi) n-Toudat; Gorges du Makin; Gorges de Taghia; Jbel Choucht; Jbel Ikis; Jbel Mahan; Jbel Rhat; Jbel Taabest; Taclghouit; Jbel Tadaghas; Jbel Tafenfent; Jbel Tarkeddid; Taberhout; Tazergount; Tizi Nehassa; Wazzant	Tubular Fodinichnia	Decapoda; Polychaeta; Sipuncula	
Chondrites	C. ispp.	Aganane; Aït-Abbès; Ait Athmane; Aït Blal; Aït Bou Guemez; Amagour; Assif Bernal; Assif Lakhdar; Assif Imejdag; Col d'Adoumaz; Col du R'nim; Col (Tizi) n-Toudat; Gorges du Makin; Gorges de Taghia; Jbel Choucht; Jbel Ikis; Jbel Mahan; Jbel Rhat; Jbel Taabest; Taclghouit; Jbel Tadaghas; Jbel Tafenfent; Jbel Tarkeddid; Taberhout; Tazergount; Tizi Nehassa; Wazzant	Tubular Fodinichnia	Polychaeta; Sipuncula	Example of Chondrites trace fossil
Cruziana	C. ispp.	Aganane; Aït-Abbès; Ait Athmane; Aït Blal; Aït Bou Guemez; Amagour; Assif Bernal; Assif Lakhdar; Assif Imejdag; Col d'Adoumaz; Col du R'nim; Col (Tizi) n-Toudat; Gorges du Makin; Gorges de Taghia; Jbel Choucht; Jbel Ikis; Jbel Mahan; Jbel Rhat; Jbel Taabest; Taclghouit; Jbel Tadaghas; Jbel Tafenfent; Jbel Tarkeddid; Taberhout; Tazergount; Tizi Nehassa; Wazzant	Ribbon-like furrows	Xiphosura; Isopoda	Example of Cruziana trace
Gastrochaenolites	G. ispp.	Aganane; Aït-Abbès; Ait Athmane; Aït Blal; Aït Bou Guemez; Amagour; Assif Bernal; Assif Lakhdar; Assif Imejdag; Col d'Adoumaz; Col du R'nim; Col (Tizi) n-Toudat; Gorges du Makin; Gorges de Taghia; Jbel Choucht; Jbel Ikis; Jbel Mahan; Jbel Rhat; Jbel Taabest; Taclghouit; Jbel Tadaghas; Jbel Tafenfent; Jbel Tarkeddid; Taberhout; Tazergount; Tizi Nehassa; Wazzant	clavate-shaped to flask-shaped tubes	Bivalves	Example of Gastrochaenolites
Glossifungites	G. ispp.	Aganane; Aït-Abbès; Ait Athmane; Aït Blal; Aït Bou Guemez; Amagour; Assif Bernal; Assif Lakhdar; Assif Imejdag; Col d'Adoumaz; Col du R'nim; Col (Tizi) n-Toudat; Gorges du Makin; Gorges de Taghia; Jbel Choucht; Jbel Ikis; Jbel Mahan; Jbel Rhat; Jbel Taabest; Taclghouit; Jbel Tadaghas; Jbel Tafenfent; Jbel Tarkeddid; Taberhout; Tazergount; Tizi Nehassa; Wazzant	Infilled abandoned burrows	Oweniidae; Priapulida; Sabellidae; Serpulidae; Siboglinidae	
Ophiomorpha	O. irregulaire; O. nodosa; O. ispp.	Aganane; Aït-Abbès; Ait Athmane; Aït Blal; Aït Bou Guemez; Amagour; Assif Bernal; Assif Lakhdar; Assif Imejdag; Col d'Adoumaz; Col du R'nim; Col (Tizi) n-Toudat; Gorges du Makin; Gorges de Taghia; Jbel Choucht; Jbel Ikis; Jbel Mahan; Jbel Rhat; Jbel Taabest; Taclghouit; Jbel Tadaghas; Jbel Tafenfent; Jbel Tarkeddid; Taberhout; Tazergount; Tizi Nehassa; Wazzant	Tubular Fodinichnia	Decapodans	Example of Ophiomorpha trace fossil
Rhizocorallium	R. parallelum; R. ispp.	Aganane; Aït-Abbès; Ait Athmane; Aït Blal; Aït Bou Guemez; Amagour; Assif Bernal; Assif Lakhdar; Assif Imejdag; Col d'Adoumaz; Col du R'nim; Col (Tizi) n-Toudat; Gorges du Makin; Gorges de Taghia; Jbel Choucht; Jbel Ikis; Jbel Mahan; Jbel Rhat; Jbel Taabest; Taclghouit; Jbel Tadaghas; Jbel Tafenfent; Jbel Tarkeddid; Taberhout; Tazergount; Tizi Nehassa; Wazzant	Tubular Fodinichnia	Decapodans; Annelids; Bony Fish	Example of Rhizocorallium specimens.
Skolithos	S. ispp.	Aganane; Aït-Abbès; Ait Athmane; Aït Blal; Aït Bou Guemez; Amagour; Assif Bernal; Assif Lakhdar; Assif Imejdag; Col d'Adoumaz; Col du R'nim; Col (Tizi) n-Toudat; Gorges du Makin; Gorges de Taghia; Jbel Choucht; Jbel Ikis; Jbel Mahan; Jbel Rhat; Jbel Taabest; Taclghouit; Jbel Tadaghas; Jbel Tafenfent; Jbel Tarkeddid; Taberhout; Tazergount; Tizi Nehassa; Wazzant	Cylindrical to subcylindrical burrows	Polychaetes; Phoronidans	Representation of Skolithos along the possible makers.
Thalassinoides	T. suevicus; T. ispp.	Aganane; Aït-Abbès; Ait Athmane; Aït Blal; Aït Bou Guemez; Amagour; Assif Bernal; Assif Lakhdar; Assif Imejdag; Col d'Adoumaz; Col du R'nim; Col (Tizi) n-Toudat; Gorges du Makin; Gorges de Taghia; Jbel Choucht; Jbel Ikis; Jbel Mahan; Jbel Rhat; Jbel Taabest; Taclghouit; Jbel Tadaghas; Jbel Tafenfent; Jbel Tarkeddid; Taberhout; Tazergount; Tizi Nehassa; Wazzant	Tubular Fodinichnia	Decapoda; Dipnoi; Bony Fish; Polychaeta; Sipuncula	Example of Thalassinoides specimens.
Teichichnus	T. ispp.	Aganane; Aït-Abbès; Ait Athmane; Aït Blal; Aït Bou Guemez; Amagour; Assif Bernal; Assif Lakhdar; Assif Imejdag; Col d'Adoumaz; Col du R'nim; Col (Tizi) n-Toudat; Gorges du Makin; Gorges de Taghia; Jbel Choucht; Jbel Ikis; Jbel Mahan; Jbel Rhat; Jbel Taabest; Taclghouit; Jbel Tadaghas; Jbel Tafenfent; Jbel Tarkeddid; Taberhout; Tazergount; Tizi Nehassa; Wazzant	Vertical to oblique burrows	Phoronidans; Polychaetes	
Zoophycos	Z. ispp.	Aganane; Aït-Abbès; Ait Athmane; Aït Blal; Aït Bou Guemez; Amagour; Assif Bernal; Assif Lakhdar; Assif Imejdag; Col d'Adoumaz; Col du R'nim; Col (Tizi) n-Toudat; Gorges du Makin; Gorges de Taghia; Jbel Choucht; Jbel Ikis; Jbel Mahan; Jbel Rhat; Jbel Taabest; Taclghouit; Jbel Tadaghas; Jbel Tafenfent; Jbel Tarkeddid; Taberhout; Tazergount; Tizi Nehassa; Wazzant	Dwelling traces	Carpitellida; Spionida; Sipuncula	Example of Zoophycos fossil

=== Anthozoa ===
Genus/Family	Species	Stratigraphic Position	Material	Notes	Images
Actinastreidae indet.	Indeterminate	Ait Athmane	Colonial Imprints	Thamnasterioid corals	Actinaraea, example of Actinastreid
Ampakabastraea	A. sp.	Ait Athmane	Imprints	A coral of the family Stylinidae.	
Archaeosmilia	A. beata; A. sp.	Ait Athmane	Imprints	A coral of the family Zardinophyllidae.	
Archaeosmiliopsis	A. sp.	Ait Athmane	Colonial Imprints	A coral of the family Archaeosmiliidae.	
Eocomoseris	E. sp.	Ait Athmane	Colonial Imprints	A coral of the family Archaeosmiliidae.	
Icaunhelia	I. sp.	Ait Athmane	Imprints	A coral of the family Archaeosmiliidae	
Oppelismilia	O. sp.	Assemsouk	Imprints	A coral of the family Oppelismiliidae.	
Paleomillepora	P. sp.	Ait Athmane	Colonial Imprints	A coral of the family Spongiocoenia	
Phacelostylophyllum	P. sp.	Assemsouk	Colonial Imprints	A coral of the family Stylophyllidae.	
Phacelophyllia	P. sp.	Ait Athmane	Colonial Imprints	A coral of the family Dermosmiliidae.	
Periseris	P. sp.	Ait Athmane	Colonial Imprints	A coral of the family Latomeandridae.	
Proleptophyllia?	P?. sp.	Ait Athmane	Imprints	A solitary coral of the family Dermosmiliidae	
Reimaniphyllidae indet.	Indeterminate	Ait Athmane	Imprints	Solitary corals	
Retiophyllia	R. zizensis; R. spp.	Ait Athmane	Colonial Imprints	A coral of the family Reimaniphylliidae.	
Stylophyllidae indet.	Indeterminate	Ait Athmane	Colonial Imprints	Phaceloid corals	Thecosmilia, example of Stylophyllid
Thamnasteria	T. cf. mettensis	Ait Athmane	Colonial Imprints	A coral of the family Thamnasteriidae.	Thamnasteria specimens

=== Porifera ===
Genus/Family	Species	Stratigraphic position	Material	Notes	Images
Cladocoropsis	C. mirabilis; C. spp.	Aganane; Aït-Abbès; Aït Blal; Jbel Tarkeddid; Wazzant	Imprints	An Axinellidan demosponge of the family Cladocoropsidae.	Extant relative, Axinella
Neuropora?	N?. ("Caunopora"?) spp.	Aganane; Jbel Azourki; Tizi n'Tizint	Imprints	An Axinellidan demosponge of the family Neuroporidae.	
Spongiomorpha	S. (Heptastylopsis) sp.	Aganane; Jbel Azourki; Tizi n'Tizint	Imprints	A potential Orchocladinan of the family Spongiomorphidae. Alternatively can be an Hydrozoan.	

=== Brachiopoda ===
Genus/Family	Species	Stratigraphic position	Material	Notes	Images
Aulacothyris	A. resupinata; A. sp.	Boumia; Mudeli-Milbadène	Isolated Shells	A Terebratulidan of the family Zeilleriidae	
Calcirhynchia	C. moghrabiensis; C. spp.	Boumia; Mudeli-Milbadène; Tizi n'Talrhemt	Isolated Shells	A Rhynchonellidan of the family Wellerellidae. It was originally identified as part of the genus Rhynchonella	
Gibbirhynchia	G. ageri; G amalthei	Tizi Nehassa	Isolated Shells	A Rhynchonellidan of the family Tetrarhynchiidae	
Grandirhynchia	G (Rhynchonella) laevigata	Tillouguit	Isolated Shells	A Rhynchonellidan of the family Tetrarhynchiidae	
Hesperithyris	H. atlantis; H. ifranensis; H. termieri; H. renierii; H. cf. sinuosa	Azrou; Boumia; Col du Tarhzeft; Jebel Hebri; Mudeli-Milbadène; Tazergount; Tazioualt; Tizi Nehassa	Isolated Shells	A Terebratulidan of the family Zeilleriidae	
Liospiriferina	L. praerostrata	Tizi Nehassa	Isolated Shells	A Rhynchonellidan of the family Spiriferinidae.	Liospiriferina specimens
Lobothyris	L. punctata; L. subpunctata	Tizi Nehassa; Tizi n'Tizint	Isolated Shells	A Terebratulidan of the family Lobothyrididae.	Lobothyris specimen (from Spain)
Parathyridina	P. mediterranea	Tizi Nehassa	Isolated Shells	A Terebratulidan of the family Zeilleriidae. A taxon living rarely communicating with the open sea.	
Spiriferina	S. falloti; S. moeschi; S. alpina; S. rostrata; S. tumida; S. obtusa; S. sp.	Boumia; Mudeli-Milbadène; S d'Ouaouizarthe; Tillouguit; Tizi n'Tizint	Isolated Shells	A Rhynchonellidan of the family Spiriferinidae	
Sulcirostra	S. brusinai	Bab-el-Hari	Isolated Shells	A Rhynchonellidan of the family Dimerellidae	
Tetrarhynchia	T. tounatensis; T. ageri	Jebel Hebri; Tizi Nehassa; Tounat-el-Mariz	Isolated Shells	A Rhynchonellidan of the family Tetrarhynchiidae	
"Terebratula"	"T." hebbriensis; "T." spp.	Jebel Hebri; Tounat-el-Mariz	Isolated Shells	A Terebratulidan of the family Terebratulidae	Terebratula specimens
Zeilleria	Z. undulata; Z. sarthacensis; Z. guerangeri; Z. ssp.	Barda; Tizi Nehassa; Tizi n'Tizint; Zawyat Ahançal	Isolated Shells	A Terebratulidan of the family Zeilleriidae	Zeilleria specimens (from Spain)

=== Mollusks ===
Genus/Family	Species	Stratigraphic position	Material	Notes	Images
Aequipecten	A. juhanus	Tizi n'Tizint	Isolated Shells	A scallop, member of the family Pectinidae	Example of extant specimen
Arcomytilus	A. furcatus	Assemsouk; Tazioualt	Isolated Shells	A mussel, member of the family Mytilidae	
Arieticeras	A. cf. algovianum	Aït Blal	Isolated Shells	An ammonite of the family Hildoceratidae.	Example of Arieticeras specimens
Aulacoceras?	A.? sp.	Todhra	Phragmocones	A Belemnoid of the family Aulacoceratidae. The genus is limited to the Triassic so the identification is likely wrong.	
Cerithiella	C. africana	Tizi n'Tizint	Isolated shells	A snail of the family Newtoniellidae	Cerithiella specimen
Ceritella	C. (Fibula) spp.	Tizi Nehassa	Isolated Shells	A snail of the family Ceritellidae	
Cochlearites	C. loppianus; C. spp.	Aganane; Aghbalou N'Kerdous; Aït-Abbès; Aït Blal; Ait Athmane; Assemsouk; Assist Bernai; Gorges du Tisakht; Jbel Choucht; Jbel Rhat; Jbel Tarahalt; Jbel Tarkeddid; Tizi Nehassa; Tizi n'Tizint	Isolated Shells	An oyster, member of Plicatostylidae.	Cochlearites
Coelostylina	C. chartroni	Jbel Tarkeddid	Isolated shells	A snail of the family Coelostylinidae	
Encyclomphalus	E. spp.	Tizi n'Tizint	Isolated Shells	A snail of the family Pleurotomariidae	
Eomiodon	E. serradensis; E. spp.	Aganane; Aït Blal; Aït-Abbès; Ait Athmane; Assemsouk; Jbel Tarkeddid	Isolated Shells	A clam, member of Neomiodontidae.	
Fibulella	F. nicolai; F. (Fibula?) afra	Tizi n'Tizint	Isolated shells	A snail of the family Ceritellidae	
Fimbria	F. trulla; F. spp.	Assemsouk; Tizi n'Tizint	Isolated Shells	A clam, member of Lucinidae.	Example of extant specimen
Fontanelliceras	F. sp.	Zawyat Ahançal	Isolated Shells	An ammonite of the family Hildoceratidae	
Gervilleia	G. termieri; G. spp.	Tazergount	Isolated Shells	An Oyster, member of Bakevelliidae.	
Gervilleioperna	G. atlanta; G. termierii; G. spp.	Ait Athmane; Assemsouk; Boumia; Mudeli-Milhadène; Tizi Nehassa	Isolated Shells	An oyster, member of Plicatostylidae.	Gervillioperna
Gryphaea	G. (Bilobissa) sp.	Ait Athmane	Isolated Shells	A clam, member of Gryphaeidae.	Specimen of the genus
Liogryphaea	L. arcuata; L. spp.	Ait Athmane; Assemsouk	Isolated Shells	A clam, member of Gryphaeidae. This genus develops a noted biostrome at Aït Athmane.	Specimens of the genus
Lithioperna	L. scutata; L. spp.	Aganane; Aghbalou N'Kerdous; Aït-Abbès; Aït Blal; Ait Athmane; Assemsouk; Assist Bernai; Barda; Gorges du Tisakht; Jbel Choucht; Jbel Rhat; Jbel Tarahalt; Jbel Tarkeddid; Tazoult; Tizi Isli; Tizi Nehassa; Tizi n'Tizint	Isolated Shells	An oyster, member of Plicatostylidae.	Lithioperna
Lucina	L. spp.	Assemsouk; Tizi n'Tizint	Isolated Shells	A clam, member of Lucinidae.	Specimen of the genus
Megalodon?	M.? sp.	Assemsouk	Isolated Shells	A clam, member of Megalodontidae.	Specimens of the genus
Modiolus	M. tirolensis; M. cf. hillana	Ait Athmane	Isolated Shells	A mussel, member of the family Mytilidae	Example of extant specimen
Nerinea	N. spp.	Aganane; Aït-Abbès; Aït Blal; Ait Athmane; Assemsouk; Tazergount; Jbel Tarkeddid	Isolated Shells	A snail of the family Nerineidae.	Specimen of the genus
Neritina	N. spp.	Tizi n'Tizint	Isolated shells	A snail of the family Neritidae	Specimen of the genus
Nanogyra	N. sp.	Ait Athmane	Isolated Shells	A clam, member of Gryphaeidae.	
Opisoma	O. menchikoffi; O. excavatum; O. bourcarti; O. spp.	Ait Athmane; Aghbalou N'Kerdous; Assemsouk; Barda; Bou Dahar; Chaaba Touila; Grand Pic de l'Ouarsenis; Jbel Choucht; Tazoult; Tizi Nehassa; Tizi n'Tizint	Isolated Shells	A clam, member of Astartidae.	
Pachygervillia	P. anguillaensis	Aganane; Aghbalou N'Kerdous; Aït-Abbès; Aït Blal; Ait Athmane; Assemsouk; Jbel Tarkeddid	Isolated Shells	An oyster, member of Plicatostylidae.	Pachygervillia
Pachyrisma	P. crassa; P. opimun; P. spp.	Aganane; Aghbalou N'Kerdous; Aït Blal; Ait Athmane; Assemsouk; Assist Bernai; Gorges du Tisakht; Jbel Choucht; Jbel Rhat; Jbel Tarahalt; Jbel Tarkeddid	Isolated Shells	A hippuritidan, member of the family Pachyrismatidae	
Pecten	P. dieulefait; P. spp.	Ait Athmane; Assemsouk; Boumia; Dades Gorges; Mudeli-Milbadène; Tizi n'Tizint	Isolated Shells	A scallop, member of the family Pectinidae	Example of extant specimen
"Perna"	"P". spp.	Tizi n'Tizint	Isolated shells	An oyster, member of Pteriidae.	Perna specimens
Phacoides	P. spp.	Ait Toumert	Isolated shells	A clam, member of Lucinidae.	Specimens of the genus
Pholadomya	P. scutata; P. voltzi	Assemsouk; Dades Gorges	Isolated Shells	A clam, member of Pholadomyidae.	Specimens of the genus
Plagiostoma	P. gigantea	Ait Athmane	Isolated Shells	A clam, member of Limidae.	Specimens of P. gigantea
Procerithium	P. canescens; P. spp.	Aganane; Aït-Abbès; Jbel Azourki; Tazergount; Tizi n'Tizint	Isolated Shells	A snail of the family Procerithiidae	
Protodiceras	P. pumilum; P. spp.	Aganane; Aghbalou N'Kerdous; Aït Blal; Ait Athmane; Assemsouk; Assist Bernai; Gorges du Tisakht; Jbel Asmir; Jbel Choucht; Jbel Rhat; Jbel Tarahalt; Jbel Tarkeddid	Isolated Shells	A clam, member of Megalodontidae.	
Pseudomelania	P. (Oonia) marucchiensis	Tizi n'Tizint	Isolated shells	A snail of the family Pseudomelaniidae	
Pseudonerinea	P. terebra; P. spp.	Aït-Abbès; Tazergount	Isolated Shells	A snail of the family Nerineidae	
Pseudopachymytilus	P. sp.	Aghbalou N'Kerdous; Ait Athmane	Isolated Shells	A clam, incertae sedis inside Pterioida.	
Scurriopsis	S. (Scurria?) parma; S. spp.	Assemsouk	Isolated Shells	A limpet of the family Lottiidae.	Specimens of the genus

=== Annelida ===
Genus/Family	Species	Stratigraphic position	Material	Habitat	Notes	Images
Serpulidae indet.	Indeterminate	Aganane; Aït-Abbès; Aït Blal; Ait Athmane; Assemsouk; Assist Bernai; Gorges du Tisakht; Jbel Choucht; Jbel Rhat; Jbel Tarahalt; Jbel Tarkeddid	Isolated or accumulated tubes	Marine or Lagoonal	A sessile Annelid of the family Serpulidae.	Example of modern Serpulid Tube

=== Decapoda ===
Genus/Family	Species	Stratigraphic position	Material	Notes	Images
Favreina	F. salevensis; F. spp.	Aganane; Aït-Abbès; Ait Athmane; Aït Blal; Assemsouk; Jbel Tarkeddid	Coprolites	Decapodan fossil coprolites, assigned to the ichnofamily Favreinidae. Referred to Axiidea-like burrowing crustaceans	Extant Axiidean
Parafavreina	P. thoronetensis; P. spp.	Aganane; Aït-Abbès; Ait Athmane; Aït Blal; Assemsouk; Jbel Tarkeddid	Coprolites	Decapodan fossil coprolites, assigned to the ichnofamily Favreinidae. Referred to Axiidea-like burrowing crustaceans	Extant Axiidean

=== Echinodermata ===
Genus/Family	Species	Stratigraphic position	Material	Notes	Images
Atlasaster	A. termieri	Boumia; Mudeli-Milbadène	Isolated Individuals	An echinoid, member of the group Irregularia	
Firmacidaris	F. ssp.	Tizi n'Tizint; Zawyat Ahançal	Isolated Individuals	An echinoid, Incertade Sedis	
Pentacrinites	P. ssp.	Aganane; Jbel Azourki; Tizi n'Tizint; Zawyat Ahançal	Columnals	A Crinoid of the family Pentacrinidae	Reconstruction
Pseudocidaris	P. ssp.	Tizi n'Tizint; Zawyat Ahançal	Isolated Individuals	An echinoid, member of the family Hemicidaridae	Reconstruction

== Dinosauria ==
=== Theropoda ===
Genus	Species	Stratigraphic position	Material	Notes	Images
Carmelopodus?	C?. isp.	Ibaqualliwn; Tabant	Footprints	Maybe ceratosaur tracks, some of large size.	Carmelopodus maybe belonged to a genus similar to Ceratosaurus.
"Carnosauria" indet.	Indeterminate	Ait Bou Oulli; Assif-n-Sremt; Ibaqualliwn; Talsnant; Tabant; Tizi Asdremt; Tizi-n-Aït Imi	Footprints	64 footprints of medium to large (30–55 cm) theropods referred as "Morphotype 3", some with resemblance to Allosauroid pes (Megalosauripus? ispp.).	Megalosauripus maybe belonged to a Carnosaur (Yuanmouraptor pictured)
Coelurosaurichnus?	C.? ispp.	Aït Blal	Footprints	Up to 96 tracks of small theropods, referred originally to "Morphotype 1", and usually attributed to dinosaurs similar to Coelophysidae. Includes pathologic trackways with evidence of limping, narrow-gauge & small tridactyl, small short narrow-gauge (didactyl-Dromaeosauripus-alike?) as well semi-plantigrade with metatarsal impressions.	The footprints of Coelurosaurichnus belong to a genus with a pes similar to Podokesaurus
Eubrontes	E. isp.; Cf.E. isp.	Aït Blal; Akourbi; Iskatafene; Ansous; Ibaqualliwn; Tabant; Taouddaat; Tizi-n-Aït Imi; Waougoulzat; Wanechki	Footprints	Eubrontes is usually related to the genus Dilophosaurus, representing basal Neotheropods. The local record includes up to 208 tracks, referred as "Morphotype 2".	Eubrontes belong to a genus with a pes similar to Dilophosaurus.
Theropoda indet.	Indeterminate	Akourbi; Aït Blal; Ansous; Aghbalou N'Kerdous; Ibaqualliwn; Iba Ziz; Issil-n-Aït Arbi; Tabant; Taouddaat; Sidi Moussa; Waougoulzat	Footprints	Incertae sedis.	

=== Sauropodomorpha ===
Several tracks, classified under a "Morphotype 3", were originally attributed to Thyreophoran (Stegosaur?) dinosaurs, even recently suggested to come from the ichnogenera Deltapodus?, Luluichnus? and Tetrapodosaurus?. These tracks are badly preserved and unusually large for an armoured dinosaur of early jurassic age (some up to 60 cm), and so likely are misidentified Sauropodomorph tracks.

Genus/Family	Species	Stratigraphic position	Material	Notes	Images
Breviparopus	B. isp.	Ahbak	Footprints	Includes traces with pes similar to Diplodocoidea, but also others that resemble basal sauropods.	Breviparopus are referred to taxa like Haplocanthosaurus, yet it doesn't mean they were made by it
Eusauropoda? indet.	Indeterminate	Aouli	NHMUK PV R36834, two complete cervical vertebrae; SNSB-BSPG 2014I106, dorsal vertebrae and a pubis fragment	Recently suggested to be a basal Sauropod similar to Amygdalodon.	
Liujianpus	L. (Lavinipes?) isp.; Aff.L.? isp.	Assif-n-Sremt; Ibaqualliwn; Tabant	Footprints	Described as the "Morphotype 1" Includes traces with pes similar to those of basal quadrupedal forms like Blikanasaurus or Melanorosauridae, yet referred to taxa such as Gongxianosaurus. Alternatively, the tracks, or some of them, can belong to the ichnogenus Lavinipes.	
Otozoum	O. moodii; Cf.O. isp.	Ibaqualliwn; Issil-n-Aït Arbi; Timit	Footprints	Cuadrupedal or semibipedal, includes a gigantic 84 or 75 cm track that represents the largest Otozoum ever described in the literature.	Otozoum may have belonged to a genus similar to that of Lamplughsaura
Parabrontopodus	P. ispp.; Aff.P. isp.	Aguer-n-Ouzrou; Aguerd; Ansous; Ibaqualliwn; Tabant; Tigharguenine; Tizi-n-Aït; Waougoulzat	Footprints	Includes tracks with pes similar to those of Vulcanodon, Rhoetosaurus, Barapasaurus or Eusauropoda.	Parabrontopodus may have belonged to a genus similar to that of Vulcanodon
Sauropodomorpha indet.	Indeterminate	Aguer-n-Ouzrou; Assif-n-Sremt; Jbel Azourki; Ibaqualliwn; Iba'ziz; Tabant; Tizi-n-Aït; Tigharguenine; Timit	Footprints	May include a Herd-like association and true Sauropod tracks.	
Sauropoda indet.	Indeterminate	Ahbak; Ait Waggown; Ansous; Tizi-n-Aït; Tabant; Timit; Iba'ziz; Taouddaat; Tigharguenine; Waougoulzat	Footprints	Incertae sedis.	

=== Ornithischia ===
Genus/Family	Species	Stratigraphic position	Material	Notes	Images
Thyreophora indet.	Indeterminate	Taouddaat	Footprints	While the tracks can resemble Iguanodon-alike pes, biomorphic-morphometric characters can only be associated with thyreophorans, what would support the bipedalism theory for this taxa.	Moyenisauropus may have belonged to a genus similar to that of Scelidosaurus.

== Rhodophyta ==
Genus/Family	Species	Stratigraphic position	Material	Notes	Images
Permocalculus	P. sp.	Barda; Jbel Choucht; Tazoult	Calcareous Imprints	A Red alga of the Gymnocodiaceae family.	
Pycnoporidium	P. sp.	Aït-Abbès	Calcareous Imprints	A Red Alga of the family Solenoporaceae	Example of modern crustose coralline algae, an equivalent of extinct Solenopores
Solenopora	S. liasica; S. spp.	Aganane; Aït Blal; Assist Bernai; Gorges du Tisakht; Jbel Choucht; Jbel Rhat; Jbel Tarahalt; Jbel Tarkeddid; Wazzant	Calcareous Imprints	A Red Alga of the family Solenoporaceae	Example of modern crustose coralline algae, an equivalent of extinct Solenopores

== Viridiplantae ==
Genus/Family	Species	Stratigraphic position	Material	Notes	Images
Acicularia	A. sp.	Jbel Choucht	Calcareous Imprints	A Green alga of the Dasycladaceae family.	
Agathoxylon	A. ("Dadoxylon") sp.	Tizi n'Tizint	Fossil Wood	Conifer Wood of the family Araucariaceae	Extant Araucarian Woods
Boueina	B. hochstetteri; B. spp.	Aganane; Aït Blal; Assist Bernai; Barda; Gorges du Tisakht; Jbel Choucht; Jbel Rhat; Jbel Tarahalt; Jbel Tarkeddid; Tazoult; Wazzant	Calcareous Imprints	A Green alga of the Halimedaceae or Udoteaceae family.	Example of Modern Udotea
Cayeuxia	C. liasica; C.? piae; C. spp.	Aganane; Aït Blal; Aghbalou N'Kerdous; Assif Oum; Assist Bernai; Chaaba Touila; Gorges du Tisakht; Jbel Akenzoud; Jbel Choucht; Jbel Rhat; Jbel Tarahalt; Jbel Tarkeddid; Tizi Nehassa; Wazzant	Calcareous Imprints	A Green alga of the Halimedaceae or Udoteaceae family.	Example of Modern Udotea
Classopollis	C. quezelii; C. yvesi	LM494, Demnate	Pollen	Conifer Pollen, type of the family Hirmeriellaceae	
Cupressacites	C. oxycedroides	LM494, Demnate	Pollen	Conifer Pollen of the family Cupressaceae(?)	Local Cupressaceous(?) pollen may have come from a taxon similar to extant Taxodium
Cylindroporella	C. sp.	Tazoult	Calcareous Imprints	A Green alga of the Dasycladaceae family.	
Diadocupressacites	D. moghrebiensis	LM494, Demnate	Pollen	Conifer Pollen of the family Cupressaceae(?)	
Fanesella	F. dolomitica	Ait Athmane	Calcareous Imprints	A Green alga of the Dasycladaceae family.	
Paleodasycladus	P. elongatus; P. fragilis; P. mediterraneus; P. barrabei; P. anae; P. spp.	Aganane; Aït Blal; Ait Athmane; Assemsouk; Assif Oum; Assist Bernai; Chaaba Touila; Gorges du Tisakht; Jbel Asmir; Jbel Choucht; Jbel Rhat; Jbel Tarahalt; Jbel Tarkeddid; Ibaqualliwn; Tazoult; Wazzant	Calcareous Imprints	A Green alga of the Dasycladaceae family.	P. mediterraneus specimens
Pseudolithocodium	P. sp.	Aganane; Aït Blal; Assist Bernai; Gorges du Tisakht; Jbel Choucht; Jbel Rhat; Jbel Tarahalt; Jbel Tarkeddid; Wazzant	Calcareous Imprints	A Green alga, likely a member of the Ulotrichales group.	
Sestrosphera	S. liasina	Aganane; Aït Blal; Assist Bernai; Gorges du Tisakht; Jbel Choucht; Jbel Rhat; Jbel Tarahalt; Jbel Tarkeddid; Wazzant	Calcareous Imprints	A Green alga of the Triploporellaceae family.	
Terquemella	T. spp.	Tizi Isli	Calcareous Imprints	A Green alga of the Bornetellaceae family.	
Thaumatoporella	T. parvovesiculifera; T. spp.	Aganane; Aït Blal; Assist Bernai; Barda; Gorges du Tisakht; Jbel Choucht; Jbel Rhat; Jbel Tarahalt; Jbel Tarkeddid; Tizi Isli; Tizi Nehassa; Tazoult; Wazzant	Calcareous Imprints	A Green alga of the Thaumatoporellales group	

== Photo Gallery ==
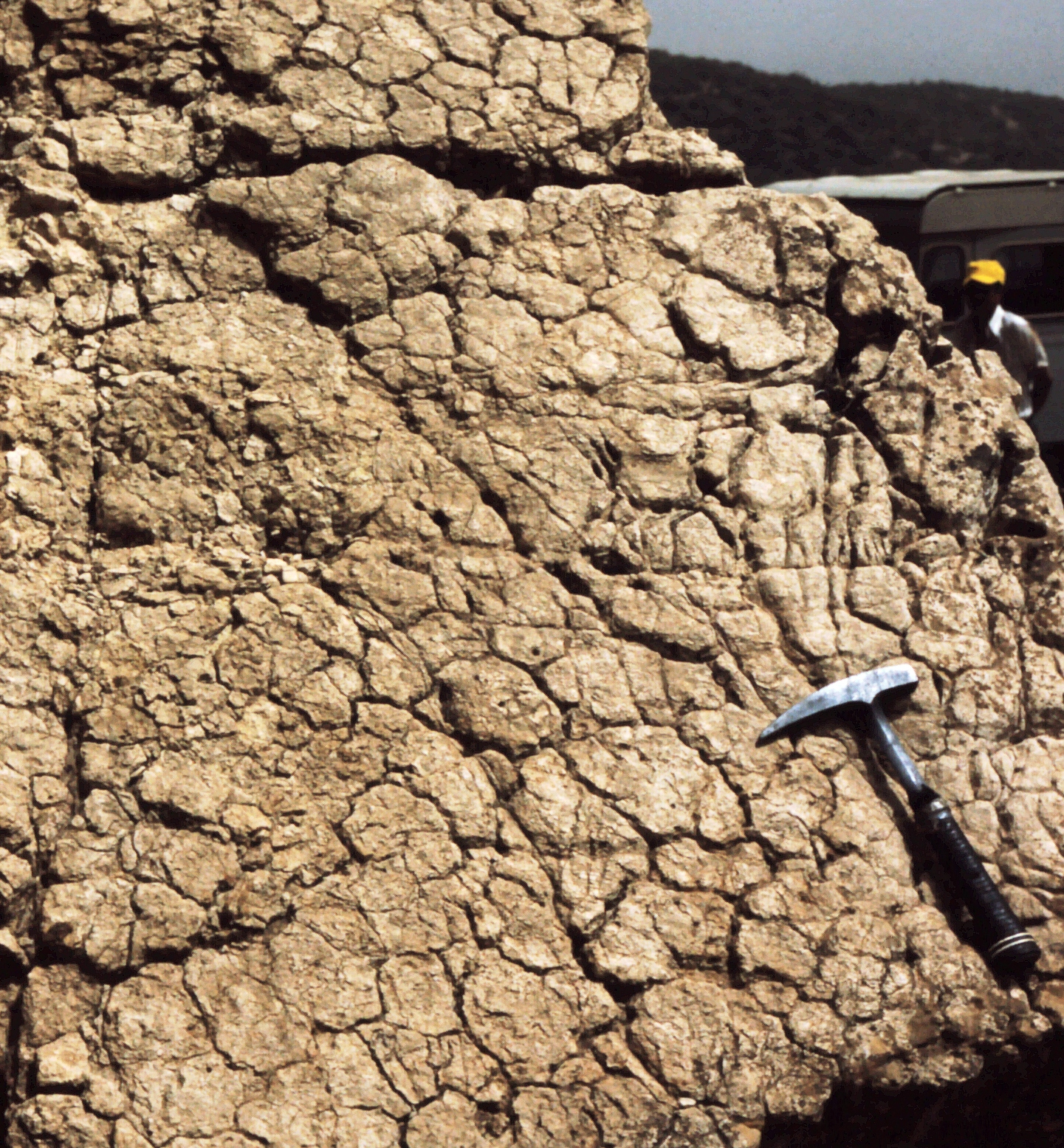
Desiccation cracks in a dolomitized limestone bench, emersive cycle top of the Lagoon

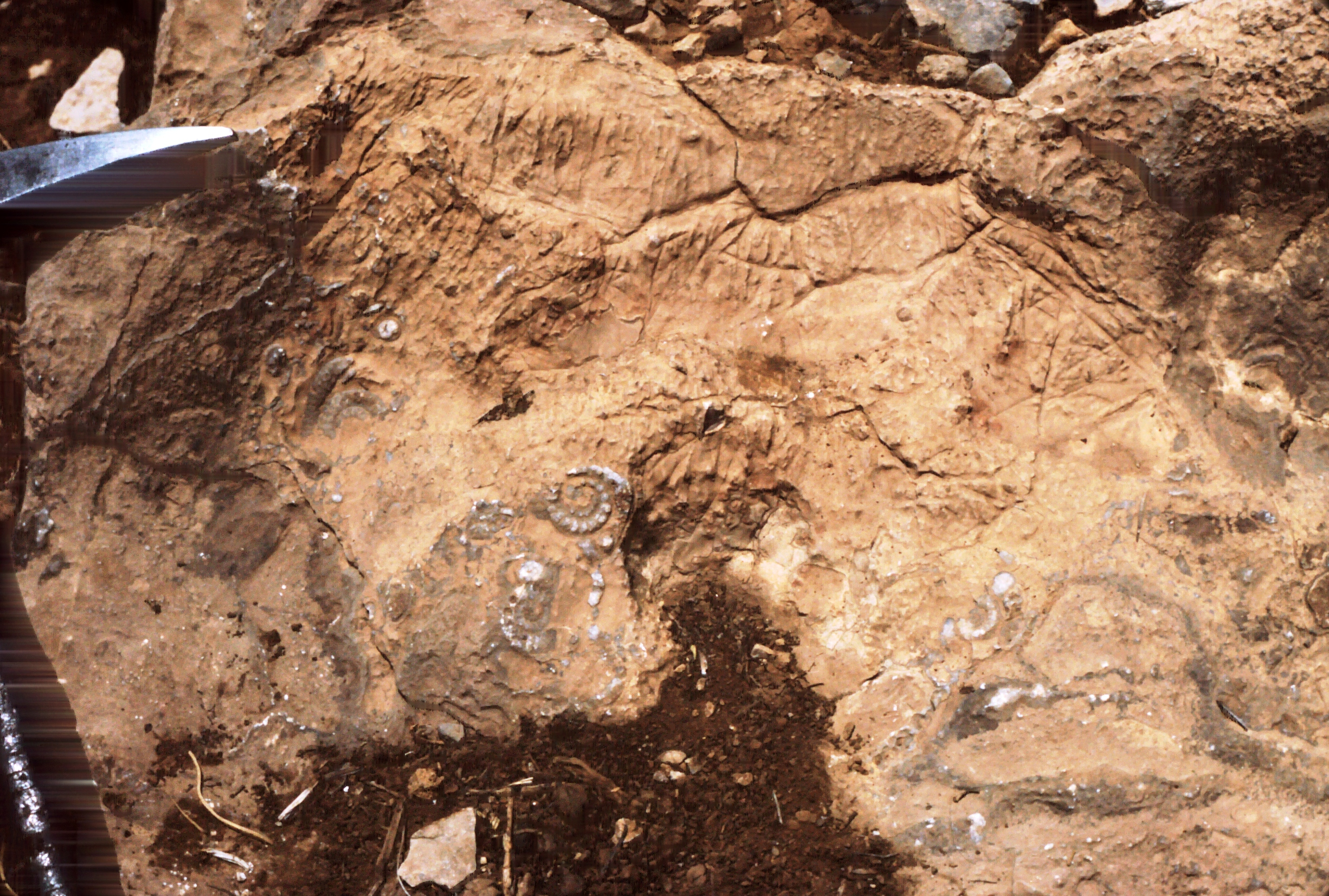
Ammonites and belemnites displaced on the supratidal plain ("teepee") by a storm wave or a tidal current

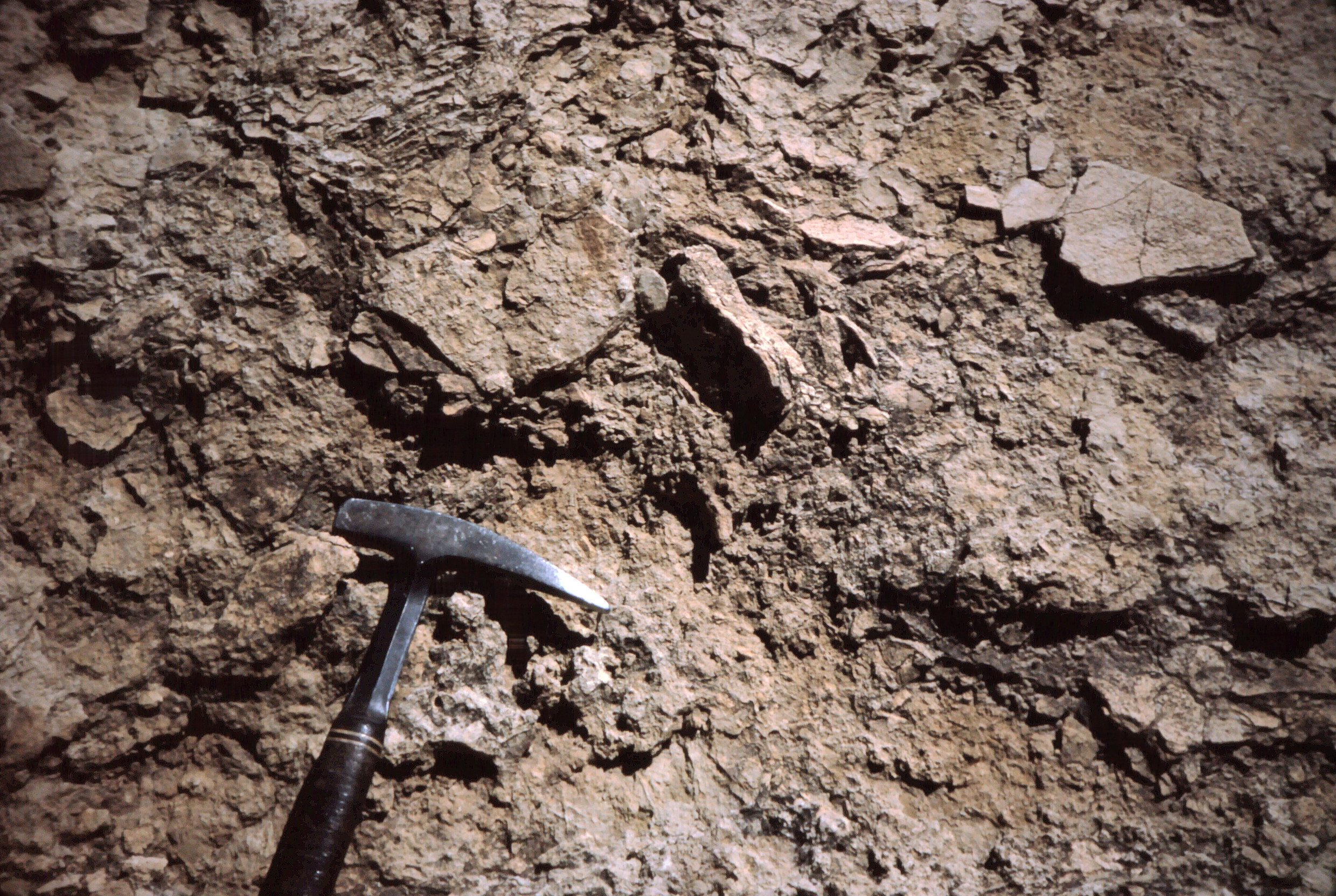
Storm breach at the top of a metric regressive sequence

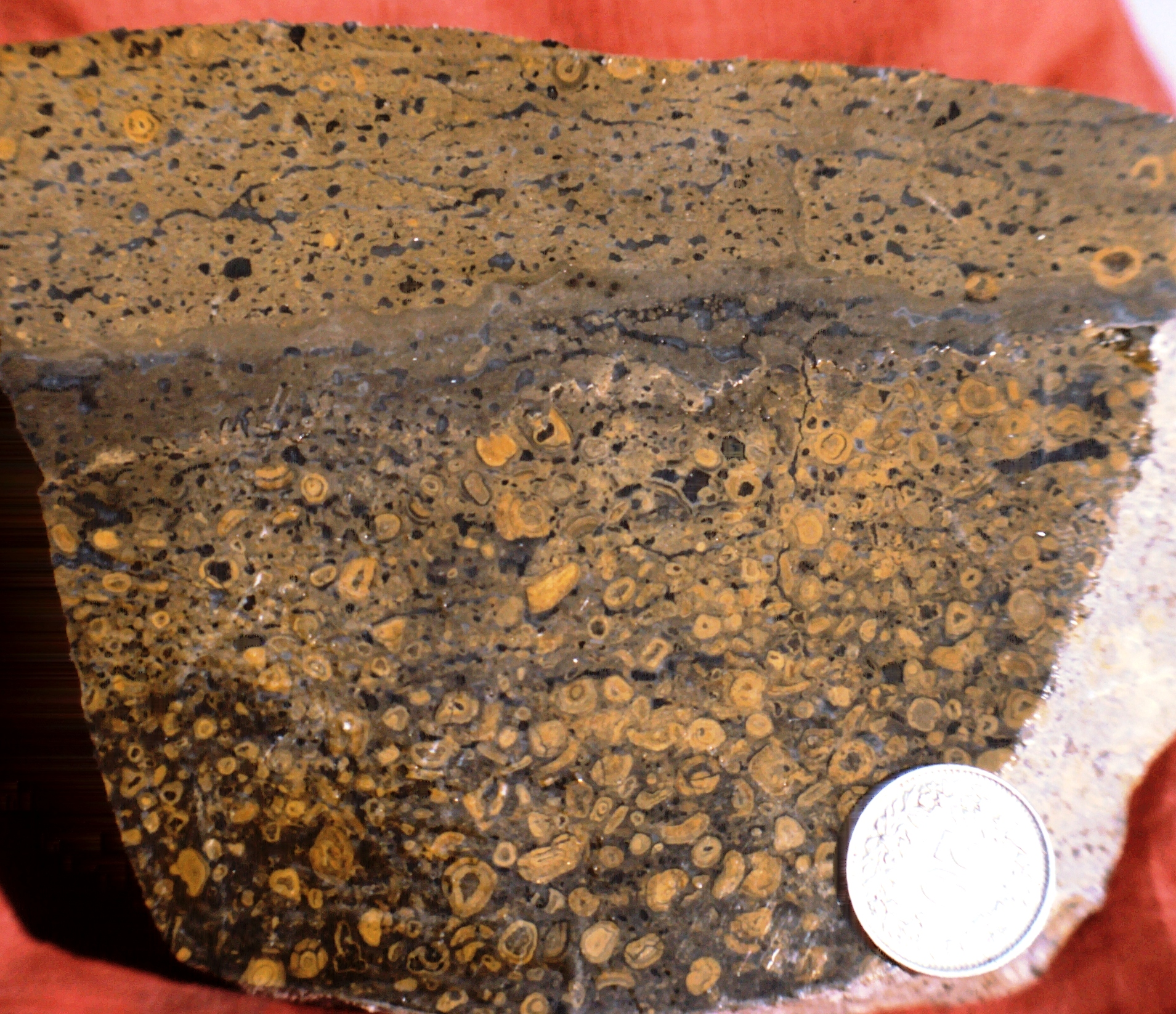
Vadose pisoliths and "birdseyes" in coastal carbonate sand, emergent; outer shelf

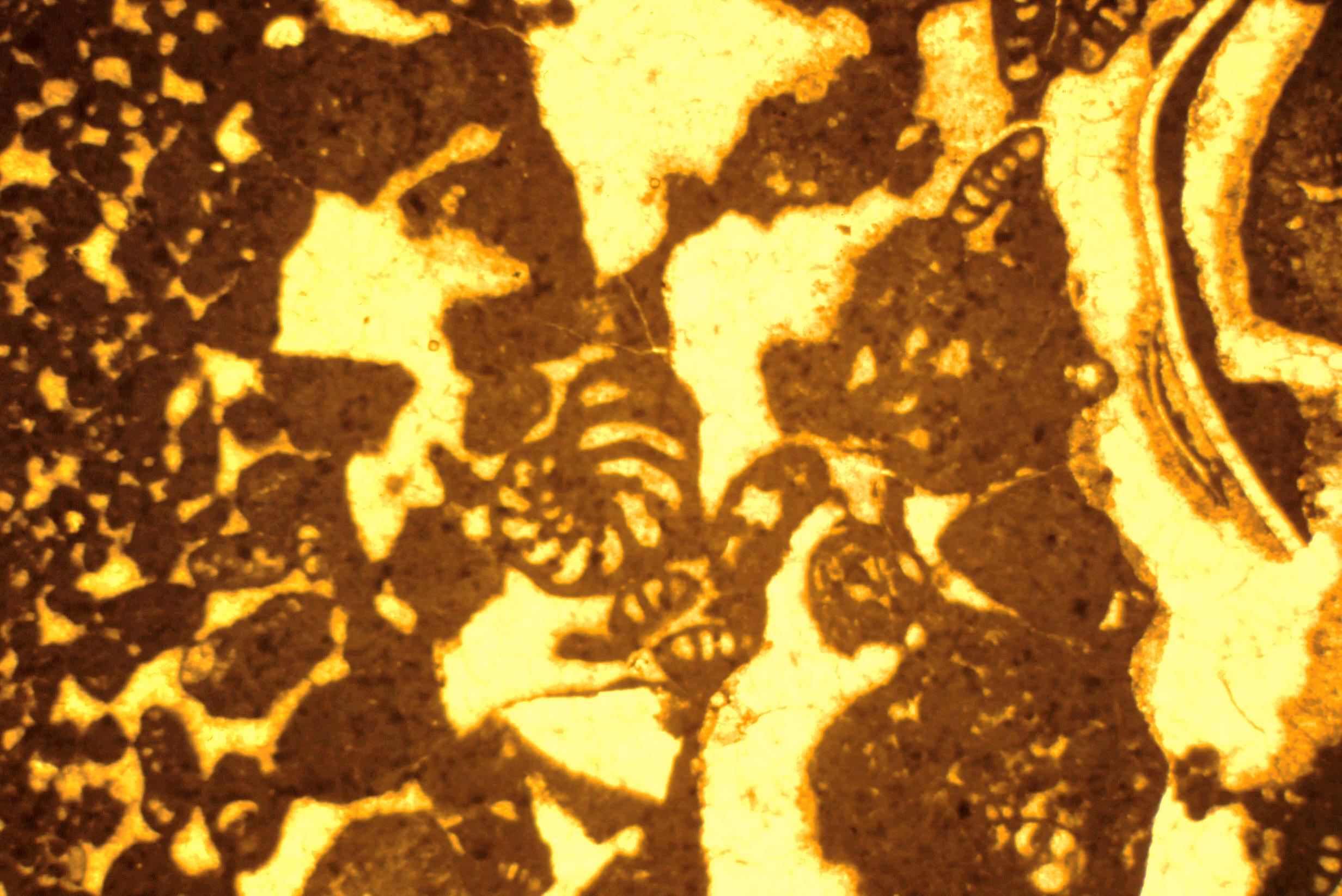
Aerial, supratidal (vadose) diagenesis in a carbonate sand with foraminifera displaced by tidal currents and storm waves on the shelf

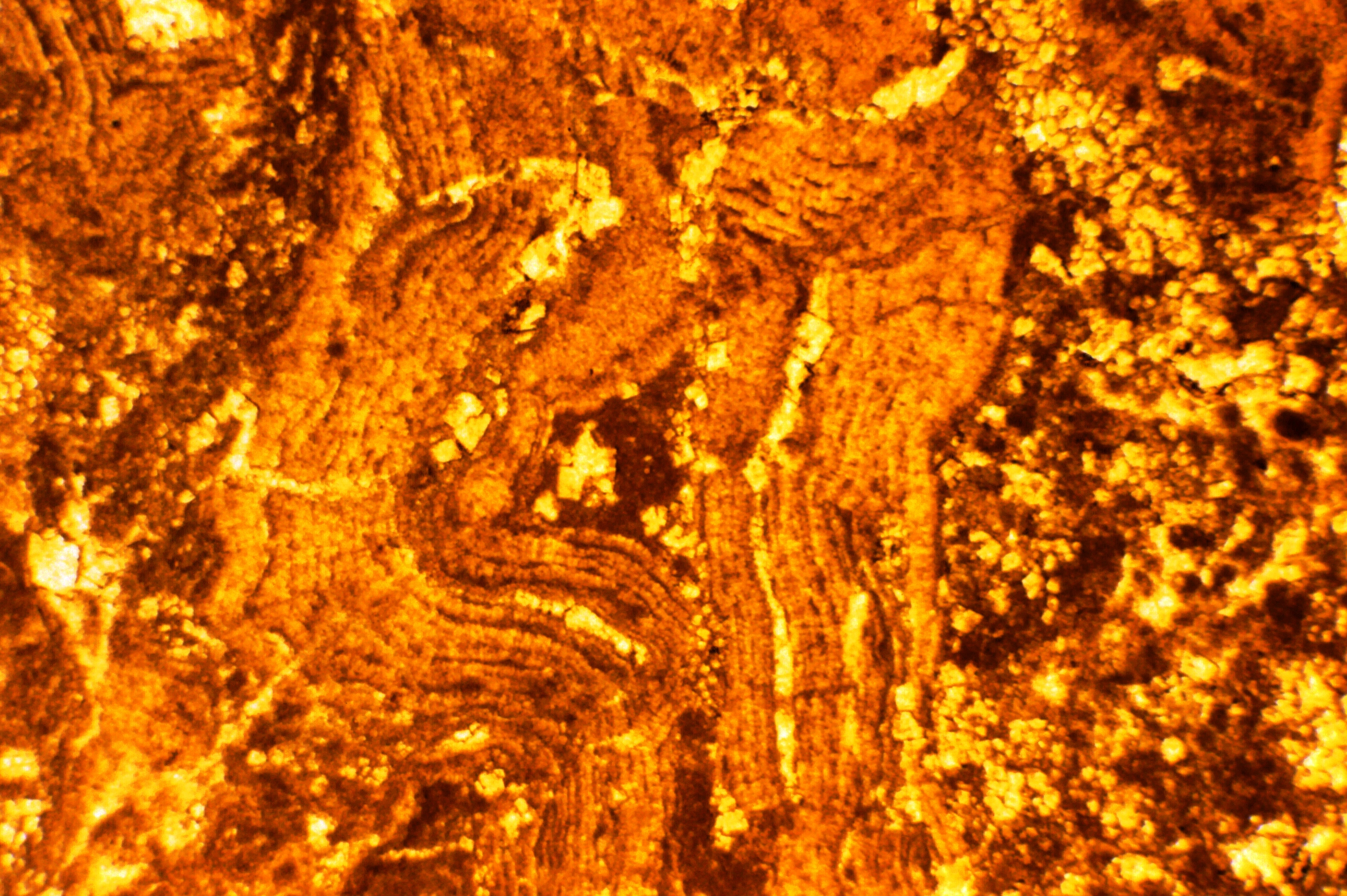
Thin layer: calcretes (calcareous crusts) reworked in a gravelly coastal sediment, partly dolomitized

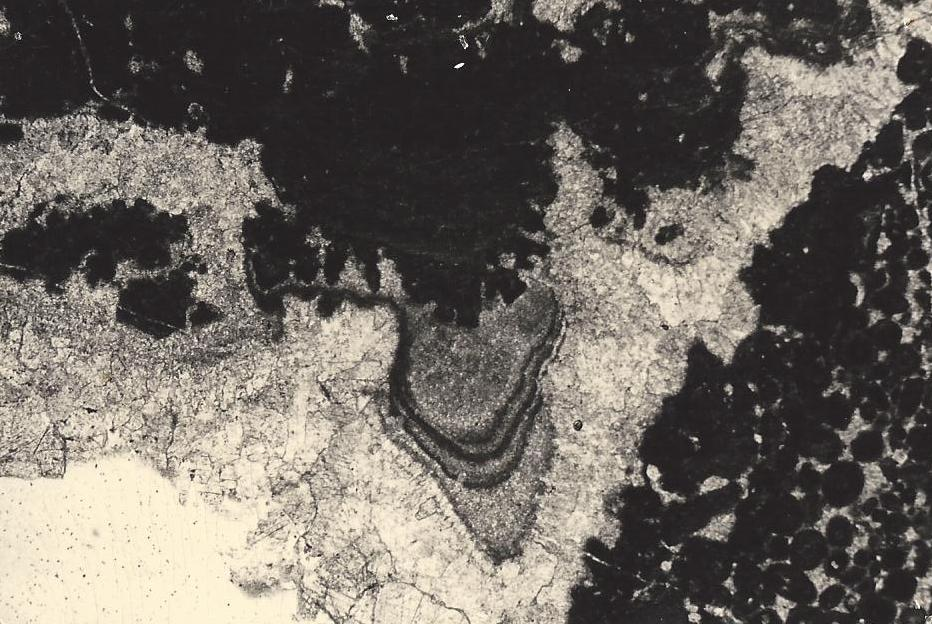
Stalactite cement at the top of a "keystone vug" typical of diagenesis in a vadose environment, at the top of an emersive cycle (L=0.3 mm)

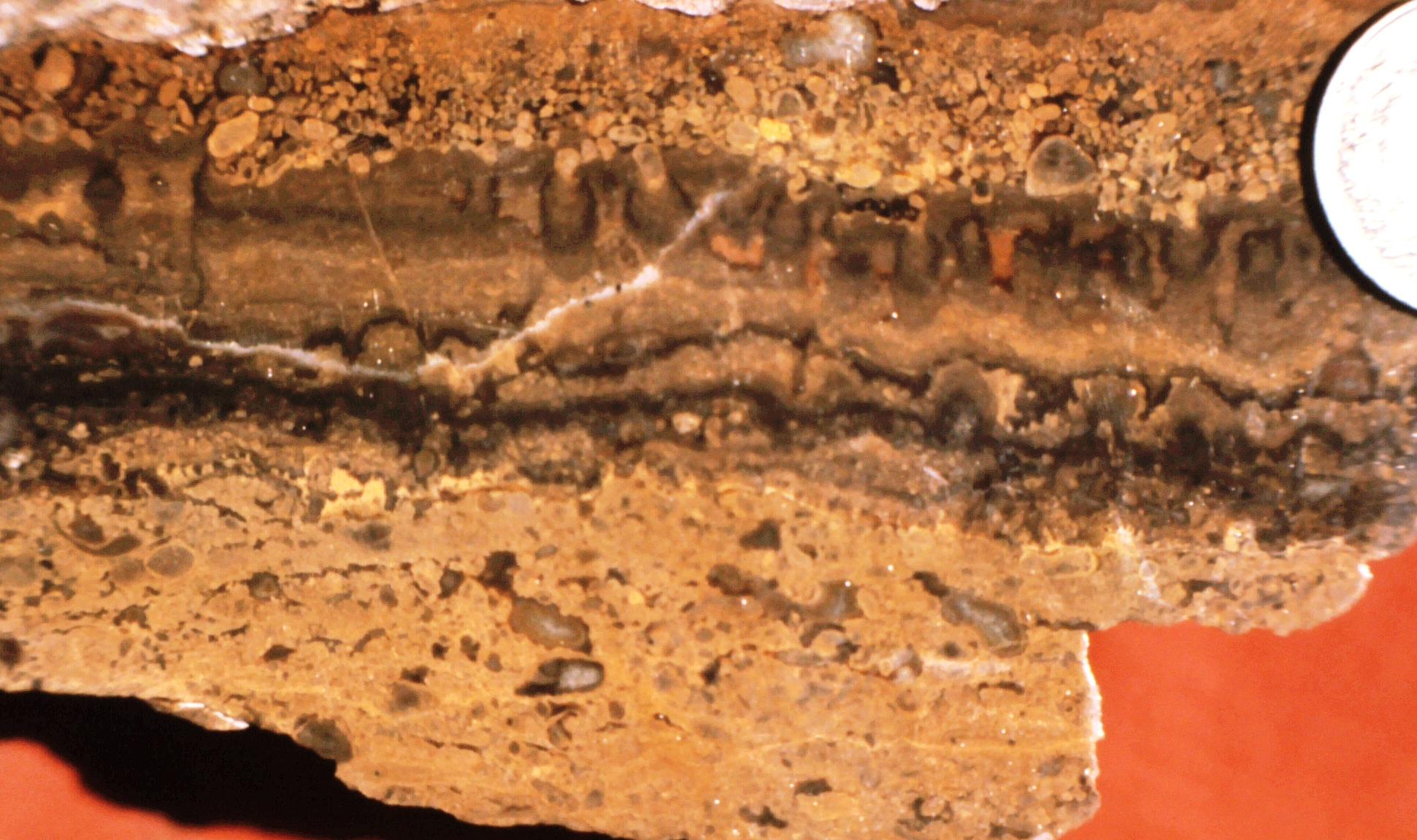
Calcretes (calcareous crust) and "birdseyes" in a gravelly coastal sediment

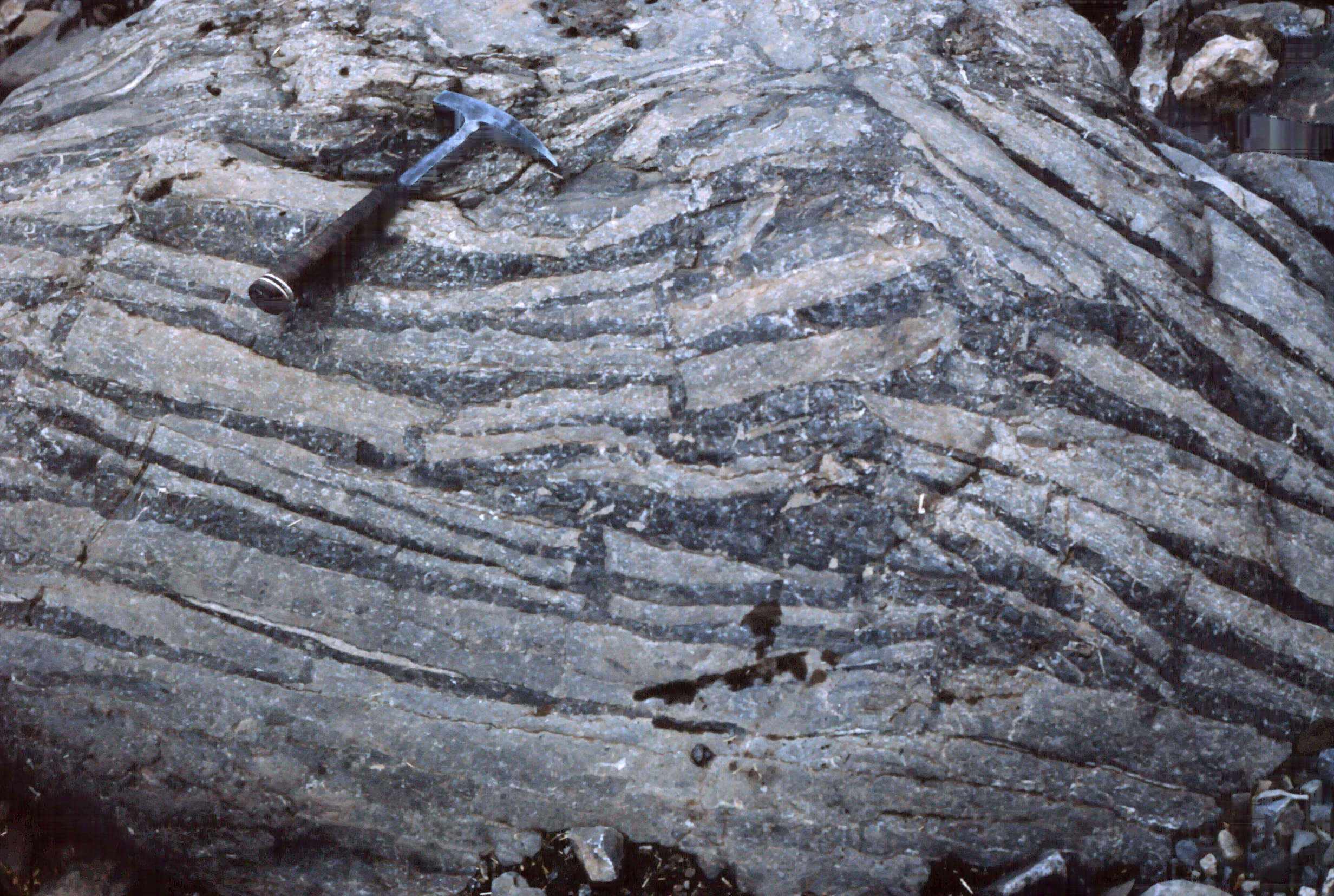
Diagenetic structure in "teepee" on the supratidal plain, formed by the increase in volume of the sediment following the crystallization of carbonates (dolomite)

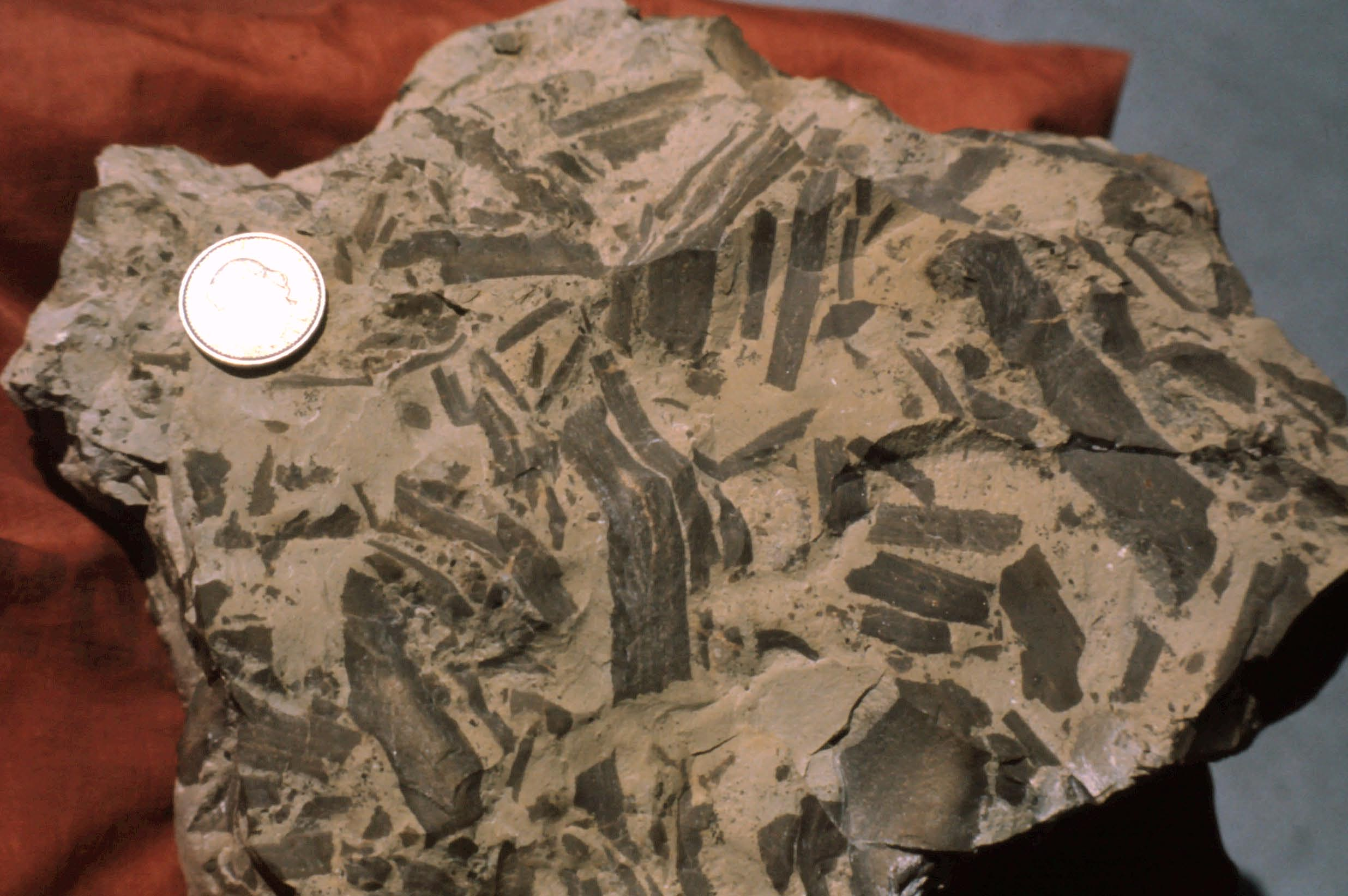
Hurricane Breccia, with dolomitic matrix. Top of emersive cycle.

== See also ==
- List of dinosaur-bearing rock formations
  - List of stratigraphic units with theropod tracks
  - List of stratigraphic units with sauropodomorph tracks
  - List of stratigraphic units with ornithischian tracks
