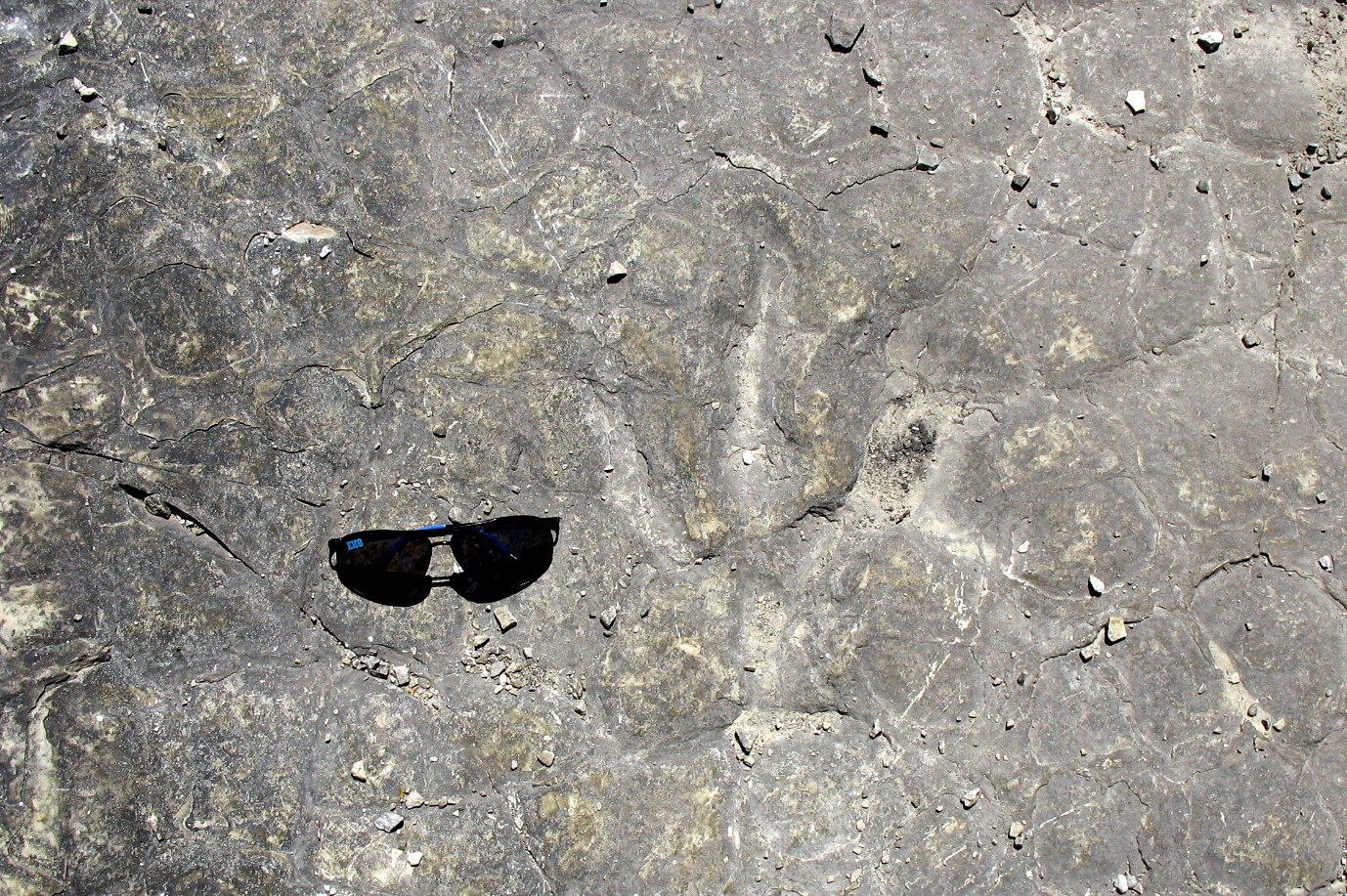
- Footprint referred to the ichnogenus Carmelopodus (Loulle)

Trace fossil classification
- Domain: Eukaryota
- Kingdom: Animalia
- Phylum: Chordata
- Clade: Dinosauria
- Clade: Saurischia
- Clade: Theropoda
- Ichnogenus: †Carmelopodus; Lockley, Hunt, Paquette, Bilbey & Hamblin, 1998

Type ichnospecies
- †Carmelopodus untermannorum Lockley et al. 1998

= Carmelopodus =

Carmelopodus Temporal range: Jurassic (Hettangian to Kimmeridgian) 201.4–149.2 Ma

Dinosaur footprint

Carmelopodus is an ichnogenus of theropod dinosaur footprint. They are suggested to belong to basal ceratosaurs, due to their similarities with abelisaurid footprints. In 2016, a large footprint from the Early Jurassic Aganane Formation of Morocco belonging to Carmelopodus sp. was estimated to belong to an 8 m (26 ft) long and 1.65 t (1.82 short tons) heavy individual. Another footprint from the Middle Jurassic of the USA that belongs to Carmelopodus untermannorum, the type species, has a size of 4 cm (0.13 ft) and was made by an individual that was 68 cm (2.2 ft) in length and 1 kg (2.2 lbs).

== See also ==
- List of dinosaur ichnogenera
