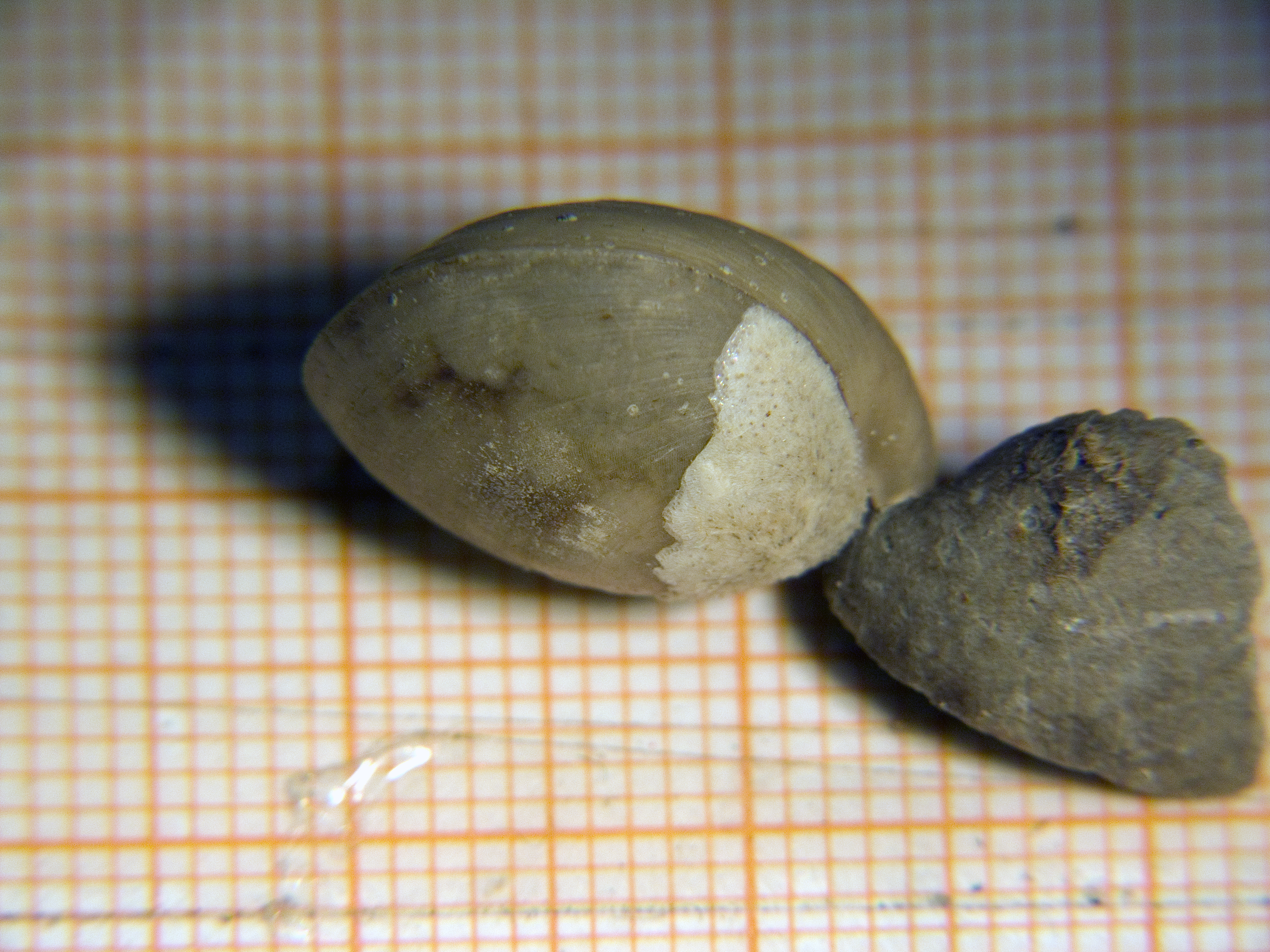
- Macandrevia cranium

Scientific classification
- Domain: Eukaryota
- Kingdom: Animalia
- Phylum: Brachiopoda
- Class: Rhynchonellata
- Order: Terebratulida
- Family: Zeilleriidae
- Genus: Macandrevia; King, 1859

= Macandrevia =

Genus of brachiopods

Macandrevia is a genus of brachiopods belonging to the family Zeilleriidae.

The genus has cosmopolitan distribution.

Species:

- Macandrevia africana Cooper, 1975
- Macandrevia americana Dall, 1895
- Macandrevia bayeri Cooper, 1975
- Macandrevia cooperi Bitner, 1996
- Macandrevia cranium (O.F.Müller, 1776)
- Macandrevia delicatula Hatai, 1836
- Macandrevia diamantina Dall, 1895
- Macandrevia emigi Bitner & Logan, 2016
- Macandrevia nipponica Nomura & Hatai, 1936
- Macandrevia tenera (Jeffreys, 1876)
