= Pycnoporidium =

Scientific classification
- Domain: Eukaryota
- Clade: Archaeplastida
- Genus: Pycnoporidium

Extinct genus of algae

Pycnoporidium is thought to be a genus of red or green alga; one species has been synonymized with the brachiopod Gosaukammerella, leaving the interpretation of the other species uncertain.
