= Cheirothyris =

Cheirothyris Temporal range: Upper Jurassic

Scientific classification
- Kingdom: Animalia
- Phylum: Brachiopoda
- Class: Rhynchonellata
- Order: Terebratulida
- Family: Zeilleriidae
- Genus: †Cheirothyris

Extinct genus of brachiopods

Cheirothyris is a genus of fossil brachiopod from the Upper Jurassic period. The shells of this genus are characterised by four, high, radially arranged ribs on each valve. On the anterior edge of the valves the ribs protrude like fingers, so that the shells look like the webbed feet of birds from above. Cheirothyris fleuriausa is one of the largest reported specimens measuring about 3 cm.
