= Zeilleriidae =

Scientific classification
- Kingdom: Animalia
- Phylum: Brachiopoda
- Class: Rhynchonellata
- Order: Terebratulida
- Superfamily: Zeillerioidea
- Family: Zeilleriidae; Allan, 1940

Family of brachiopods

Zeilleriidae is a family of brachiopods belonging to the order Terebratulida.

== Genera ==
Genera:

- Advenina Sandy, 1986
- Ajukuzella Ovtsharenko, 1983
- Antiptychina Zittel, 1880
- Aulacothyris Douvillé, 1879
- Aulacothyroides Dagis, 1965
- Bakonithyris Voros, 1983
- Bakonithyris Vörös, 1983
- Calpella (brachiopod) Owen & Rose, 1997
- Carpatothyris Smirnova, 1975
- Cheirothyris
- Cincta Quenstedt, 1868
- Cinctopsis Sucic-Protic, 1985
- Columellithyris Tchorszevsky & Radulovic, 1984
- Digonella Muir-Wood, 1934
- Enodithyris Smirnova, 1986
- Eoantiptychia Xu & Lui, 1983
- Epicyrta Deslongchamps, 1884
- Fimbriotyhyris
- Flabellothyris Eudes-Deslongchamps, 1884
- Fletcherithyroides Dagis, 1977
- Gemerithyris Sibik, 1977
- Irenothyris Pozhariskaya, 1966
- Karpatiella Sucic-Protic, 1985
- Kedrovothyris Smirnova, 1990
- Keratothyris Tuluweik, 1965
- Kolymithyris Dagys, 1965
- Lazella Radulovic, 1991
- Macandrevia King, 1859
- Menathyris Feldman, 2013
- Misunithyris Baeza-Carratalá, Pérez-Valera & Pérez-Valera, 2018
- Modestella Owen, 1961
- Mycerosia Cooper, 1989
- Neozeileria Andrade, 2006
- Obvothyris Buckman, 1927
- Ornithella Eudes-Deslongchamps, 1884
- Paragusarella Shi, 1992
- Parantiptychia Xu & Liu, 1983
- Parathyridina Schuchert & Le Vene, 1929
- Periallus Hoover, 1979
- Pirotella Sucic-Protic, 1985
- Plesiothyris Douvillé, 1879
- Polyplectella Feldman, Owen & Hirsch, 2001
- Rhomboidella Sucic-Protic, 1985
- Rugitella Muir-Wood, 1934
- Sacothyris -Jin et al., 1977
- Sacothyropsis Chen, Rao, Zhou, Pan, 1986
- Securina Vörös, 1983
- Selongthyris Wang & Chen, 2022
- Silesiathyris Brugge, 1977
- Sinusella Sucic-Protic, 1985
- Somalithela Muir-Wood, 1935
- Tauromenia
- Tetjuchithyris Smirnova, 1986
- Triseptothyris Xu, 1978
- Tubegatanella Prozorovskaya, 1968
- Uniptychina Almeras & Elmi, 1998
- Vectella Owen, 1965
- Walkeria Haas, 1890
- Worobiella Dagys, 1959
- Zeilleria Bayle, 1878
- Zeillerina Kyansep, 1959,
