= Gosaukammerella =

Gosaukammerella Temporal range: Late Triassic

Scientific classification
- Kingdom: Animalia
- Phylum: Brachiopoda
- Class: †Strophomenata
- Order: †Productida (?)
- Genus: †Gosaukammerella

Extinct genus of brachiopods

Gosaukammerella is a genus of strophomenid brachiopods, with one species Gosaukammerella eomesozoica. It was originally thought to be a problematic calcareous alga, and described under the name Pycnoporidium eomesozoicum.
