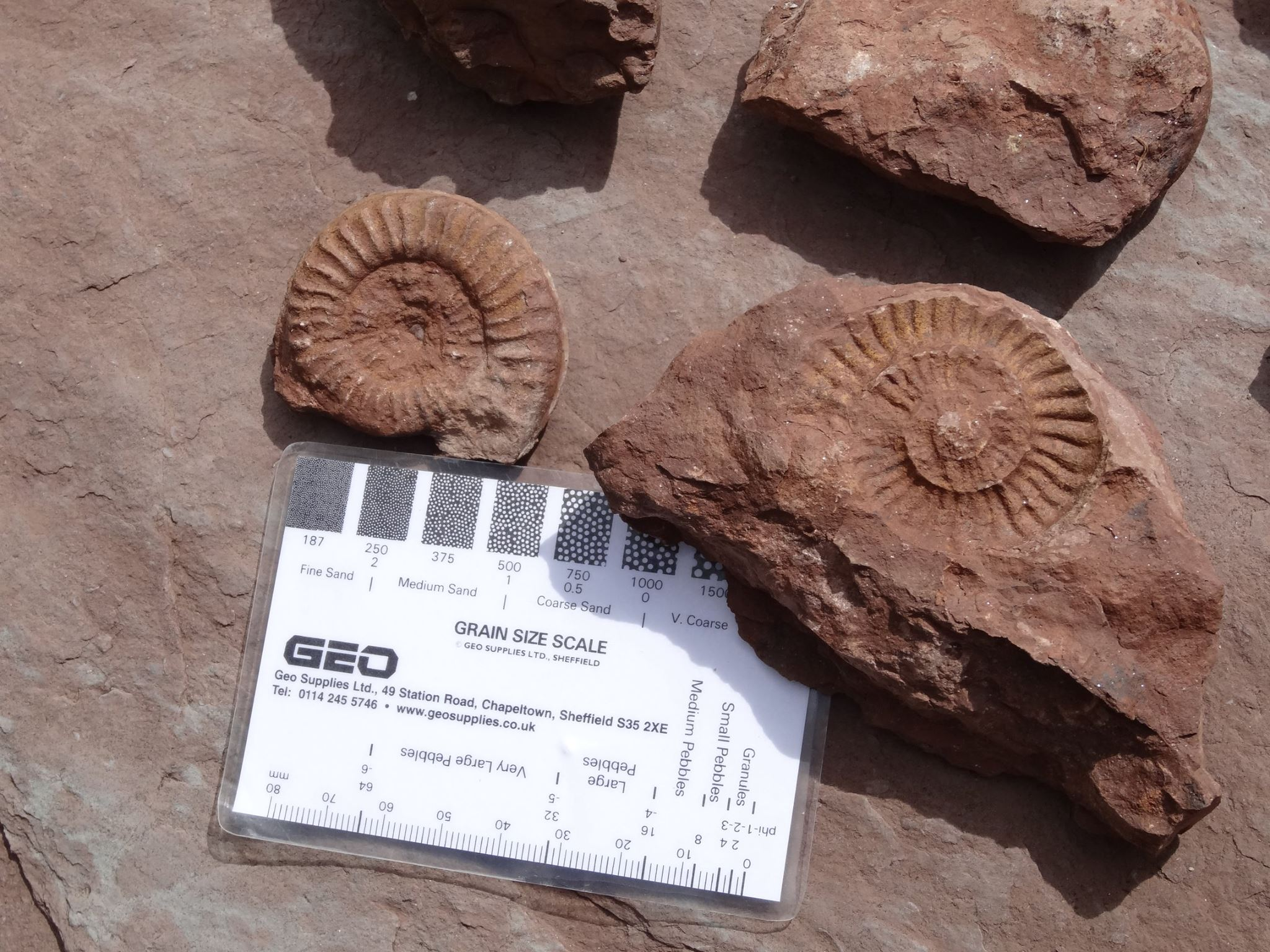
- Specimens

Scientific classification
- Kingdom: Animalia
- Phylum: Mollusca
- Class: Cephalopoda
- Subclass: †Ammonoidea
- Genus: †Arieticeras

= Arieticeras =

Arieticeras Temporal range: Pliensbachian

Extinct genus of molluscs

Arieticeras is an extinct genus of cephalopod belonging to the Ammonite subclass.
