= Red Sea mangroves =

Ecoregion along the coast of the Red Sea

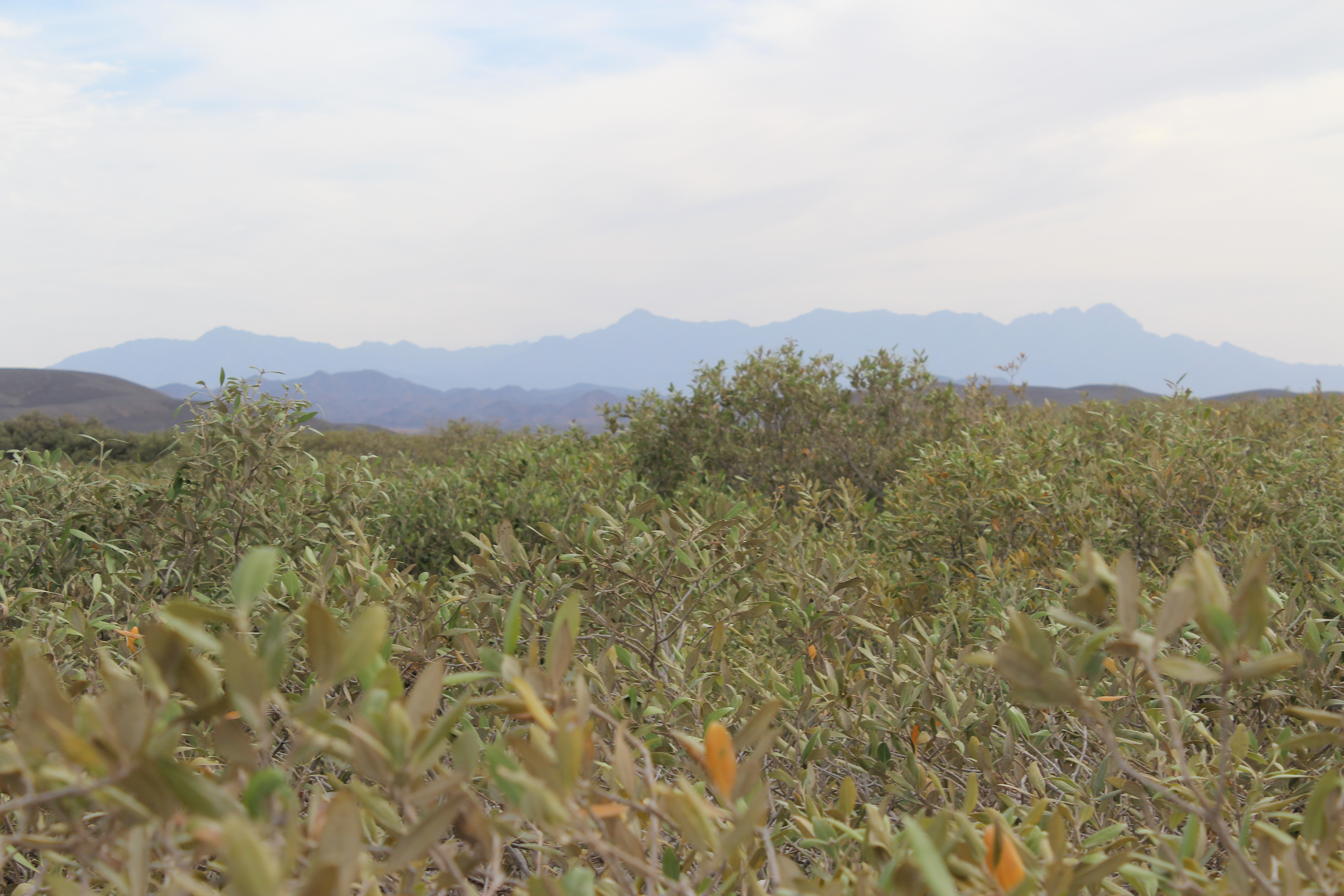
- Mangroves, Wadi El Gemal National Park, Egypt

Ecology
- Realm: Afrotropical

Geography
- Area: 1,170 km^{2} (450 sq mi)
- Countries: Djibouti, Egypt, Eritrea, Saudi Arabia, Somalia, Sudan and Yemen

The Red Sea mangroves ecoregion is defined by One Earth to span mangrove forests along the coast of the Red Sea. The ecoregion has no source of fresh water and the temperatures get high in the summer (e.g., over 31 °C or 88 °F) which causes the salinity of the mangrove forest to be high. The soils of the ecoregion are carbonates, which are poor in iron. The unusual soil stunts the growth of the mangroves, limiting their height to approximately 2 m (7 ft).

The dominant mangrove species is Avicennia marina, with Rhizophora mucronata, Bruguiera gymnorhiza, and Ceriops tagal in a few areas. Avicennia marina occurs in pure stands, excluding other mangrove species. The mangroves cover 175 km^{2} (68 sq mi) of area. Despite a global decline in mangrove ecosystems, the area of Red Sea mangroves has grown from 1972 to 2013.

The ecoregion serves as an important habitat for migratory birds, such as cormorants, egrets, herons, kingfishers, ospreys, pelicans, and waders. Birds native to the ecoregion include black kites, Goliath herons, pink-backed pelicans, and western reef herons. The mangroves serve as important nursery habitat for sea life, which includes black seabream, common ponyfish, jellyfish, milkfish, sea spiders, and tiger perch.

More than 76 species of marine macroalgae are associated with the mangroves. Species such as Sargassum dentifolium and Turbinaria triquetra grow in thick mats and contribute a substantial amount of the nitrogen and biomass of the mangrove forest. Thirty-nine species of marine fungus grow on the decaying wood of the mangroves, with Swampomyces armeniacus being the most common.

In addition to contributing to biodiversity, the Red Sea mangroves provide other ecosystem services: they protect the coast from erosion and storms, absorb pollution, and supply breeding ground for commercial fisheries. Mangroves also sequester a large amount of carbon from the atmosphere.
