= Ait Attab =

River valley in Morocco

Coordinates: 32°06′35″N 6°42′30″W

Ait Attab (Arabic: ايت اعتاب, Tamazight: ⴰⵢⵜ ⵄⵜⴰⴱ) is a large agricultural river valley on the northern edge of Azilal province in Morocco. Its population is divided into a multitude of hamlets called douwars, the largest one being Al Garage, which is also referred to as Ait Attab Center, or more simply as Ait Attab.

== Geography ==
The geography of Ait Attab valley is dominated by the flow of the river Oued el Abid. The valley has a mid-valley ridge that is the shape of an enormous right foot approximately 25 km (16 mi) in length.

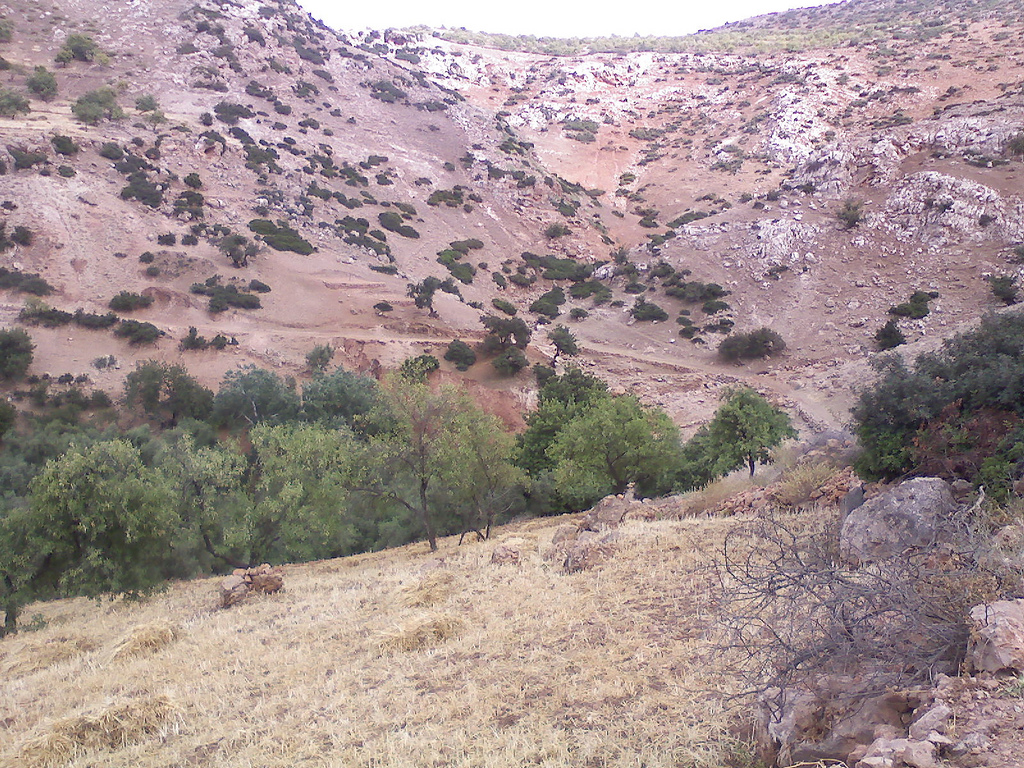
View of Ait Attab

== History ==
Ait Attab is a Sanhaja Amazigh tribe located within the Central High Atlas Mountains, it neighbors the Ntifa to the west, the Beni Moussa to the north, the Ait Messad to the south, and the Ait Bouzid and Ait Ayad to the east. The Ait Attab valley is locally well known for its influence prior to, and resistance against French colonization. It is rumored in Azilal Province that the dam upstream at Bin el Ouidane was built by the French as a means of countering the valley's influence by controlling its water supply.

== Present day ==
Today, Ait Attab is regionally known for the quality of its olive oil and almond harvest. It is also a common stopping point for tourists on their way to the waterfalls at Ouzoud. The area is traditionally of Amazigh heritage; most of the Attabis speak the valley's dialect of Tamazight, similar to the kind spoken downstream at Bzou.
