= M'Goun Conservation Area =

Protected area and UNESCO Global Geopark in Morocco, Africa

- Location within Morocco
- Location: Azilal Province, Morocco
- Coordinates: 31°58′1″N 6°34′10″W
- Area: 5,730 km^{2} (2,210 sq mi)

The M'Goun Conservation Area (Berber languages: ⵎⴳⵓⵏ, Arabic: مكون) is a protected area and UNESCO Global Geopark in the Atlas Mountains of central Morocco.

== Sites ==
The conservation area includes the following sites.

- Bin el Ouidane Dam
- Geopark Museum in Azilal
- Imi-n-Ifri Formation
- Ouzoud Falls
- Zaouiat Ahansal
