= Guettioua Formation =

Geological formation in Morocco

- Stratigraphic range: Bathonian-Callovian; ~168–161 Ma
- Type: Geological formation
- Underlies: Iouaridène Formation
- Overlies: Tilougguit Formation / Tanant 3 limestones (variable)
- Thickness: Highly variable: 80–600+ m (typically 150–600 m in type area)

Lithology
- Primary: Sandstone
- Other: Siltstone, marl, conglomerate

Location
- Coordinates: 32.5°N 5.8°W
- Approximate paleocoordinates: 27.9°N 1.4°W
- Region: Azilal Province, Béni Mellal Province, Ouarzazate Province
- Country: Morocco
- Extent: Béni Mellal-Khénifra, Central High Atlas (Guettioua, Aït-Attab, Aït-Toutline, Aït-Ourir, Toundoute nappe)

Type section
- Named for: Guettioua (cuvette des Guettioua)
- Named by: E. Roch
- Guettioua Formation (Morocco) Location of the Guettioua Formation in Morocco

The Guettioua Formation or Formation des Grès des Guettioua is a geological formation in Morocco. It dates to the Bathonian stage of the Middle Jurassic. It largely consists of continental red sandstone and is the lateral equivalent of the marine El Mers Formation. It´s synonyms include Grès de Wansero, Grès des Guettioua or Infracénomanien/Jurassique continental.

== History ==
The formation was introduced by E. Roch in 1933 for the red beds in the Guettioua basin overlying Bajocian limestones. Its age was long debated, initially considered "Dogger", later assigned to the Cretaceous by some authors due to apparent basal unconformities. Jenny, Le Marrec & Monbaron (1981) restricted the name to the red sandstones above Bajocian limestones and below the Iouaridène Formation, confirming a Bathonian age through dinosaur correlations, palynology of the overlying unit, revised radiometric dating of associated volcanics, and lateral facies comparisons with the El Mers and Anemzi formations.

== Description ==
The Guettioua Formation is composed almost exclusively of reddish detrital sediments ranging from conglomerates to silts, varied quartz content, all brick-red, although gray-yellow conglomeratic channels occur, often containing plant debris, bone fragments, and occasionally azurite and malachite. The sandstones are feldspathic, with rounded quartz grains, feldspars (labradorite, bytownite), micas, volcanic rock fragments (rhyolites), and hematite. The formation records the Atlas first basaltic event (locally B1), formed by numerous lava flows that flowed towards the north and northwest of the basins. Due to the lenticular and channelized nature of the unit, no single type section is representative. The base may show a progressive transition with the underlying Tanant 3 Formation or a progressive syntectonic unconformity, resting on various older units down to the Imi-n-Ifri Formation in places. Upper boundary passes gradually upward into the red pelites of the Iouaridène Formation, known for abundant dinosaur trackways.

=== Sedimentology ===
The formation represents predominantly continental, deltaic to palustrine (marsh/lacustrine margin) environments. Diagnostic features include conglomeratic channels, raindrop impressions, ferric oxide staining, cross-stratification, lenticular bedding, abundant plant trunks, and terrestrial vertebrates. Synsedimentary tectonics caused significant thickness variations, basin tilting, and intraformational unconformities. Associated magmatic activity includes basaltic flows, dykes, and gabbroic intrusions in some areas (especially Aït-Attab and Aït-Toutline).

Thickness varies significantly (from 10–20 m in the Ait Ourir area to 500–600 m in the Msemrir syncline) due to syn-depositional tectonics and differential subsidence. The formation is widely exposed in the axial zone and northern front of the Central High Atlas, with occurrences also along the southern margin. Fluvial paleocurrent data indicate a dominant sediment transport toward the north-east and east. The western part of the Central High Atlas (Marrakesh High Atlas sector) acted as a topographic high supplying clastic material, while major depocenters and distributive fluvial fans developed eastward. This pattern reflects an early relief differentiation within the Atlas domain during the Bathonian.

The formation extends with relatively consistent facies to the Ait Ourir region. West of Demnate, distinction from underlying red units is difficult. Thickness varies strongly due to tectonic activity. Eastward, marls and pelites intercalate, producing variegated ("Neapolitan slice") facies. It is also recognised on the southern flank of the High Atlas.

== Biota ==
=== Invertebrates ===
Color key: Taxon / Reclassified taxon / Taxon falsely reported as present / Dubious taxon or junior synonym / Ichnotaxon / Ootaxon / Morphotaxon	Notes; Uncertain or tentative taxa are in small text; ~~crossed out~~ taxa are discredited.

Genus/Family	Species	Location	Material	Notes	Images
Conichnus	C. isp.	Tizi N'Talghemt	Plug-shaped vertical burrows	Made by clams or snails	
Rhizocorallium	R. commune	Tizi N'Talghemt	Spreite burrows	Polychaetes?	
Thalassinoides	T. suevicus	Tizi N'Talghemt	Three-dimensional large burrow system	Decapod crustacean?	
Unionida indet.	Indeterminate	Wawmda	Shells	Freshwater Bivalve	

=== Amniotes ===
Genus/Family	Species	Location	Material	Notes	Images
Anchisauripus?	A. isp.	Msemrir	Footprints	Neotheropod tracks	
Atlasaurus	A. imelakei	Wawmda	"Numerous fragments from several individuals"	Either Brachiosaur or Eusauropod	Atlasaurus
Carmelopodus	cf.C. untermannorum	Msemrir	Footprints	Ceratosauria tracks	
Carnosauria indet.	Indeterminate	Msemrir	Footprints	Incertade Sedis	
Changpeipus	C. carbonicus	Msemrir	Footprints	Neotheropod tracks	
Crocodylopodus	C. isp.	Msemrir	Footprints	Crocodylomorpha tracks	
Eubrontes	E. isp.	Tizi N'Talghemt	Footprints	Neotheropod tracks	
Grallator	cf. G. isp.	Msemrir	Footprints	Neotheropod tracks	
Iguanodontipus	I. burreyi; I. isp.	Tizi N'Talghemt	Footprints	Iguanodont tracks	
Kayentapus	cf.K. isp.	Msemrir	Footprints	Neotheropod tracks	
Lacertipus?	L.? isp.	Msemrir	Footprints	Lacertiform (Squamata? or Rhynchocephalia?)	
Sauropoda indet.	Indeterminate	Aît Issa	Indeterminate bones	Incertade Sedis	
Sauropoda indet.	Indeterminate	Tizi-n-Isly	Footprints	Incertade Sedis	
Theropoda indet.	Indeterminate	Wawmda	Teeth	Incertade Sedis	
Theropoda indet.	Indeterminate	Aît Issa; Msemrir	Footprints	Incertade Sedis	
Toyamasauripus	T. isp.	Tizi N'Talghemt	Footprints	Ornithopod? tracks	
Trisauropodiscus	T. isp.	Msemrir	Footprints	"Avian-like" theropod or ornithopod trackmakers	

=== Plants ===
Genus/Family	Species	Location/Level	Material	Notes	Images
Baculatiporites	B. piloleus	LM494, Demnate	Spores	Ferns spores of the family Osmundaceae	
Classopollis	C. senegalensis	LM494, Demnate	Pollen	Conifer pollen of the family Hirmeriellaceae	
Concavissimisporites	C. verrucosus	LM494, Demnate	Pollen	Ferns spores of the family Lygodiaceae	Modern Lygodiaceae
Corollina	C. bussonii	LM494, Demnate	Pollen	Conifer pollen of the family Hirmeriellaceae	
Corollina	C. caratinii	LM494, Demnate	Pollen	Conifer pollen of the family Hirmeriellaceae	
Corollina	C. quezelii	LM494, Demnate	Pollen	Conifer pollen of the family Hirmeriellaceae	
Corollina	C. yvesi	LM494, Demnate	Pollen	Conifer pollen of the family Hirmeriellaceae	
Cupressacites	C. oxycedroides	LM494, Demnate	Pollen	Conifer pollen, family Cupressaceae	Modern Cupressaceae
Deltoidospora	D. minor	LM494, Demnate	Spores	Ferns spores Incertade Sedis	
Diadocupressacites	D. moghrebiensis	LM494, Demnate	Pollen	Conifer pollen, family Cupressaceae(?)	
Ephedripites	E. sp. 1	LM494, Demnate	Pollen	Gnetalean pollen of the family Ephedraceae	Modern Ephedraceae
Ephedripites	E. sp. 2	LM494, Demnate	Pollen	Gnetalean pollen of the family Ephedraceae	Modern Ephedraceae
Ephedripites	E. sp. 3	LM494, Demnate	Pollen	Gnetalean pollen of the family Ephedraceae	Modern Ephedraceae
Exesipollenites	E. sp.	LM494, Demnate	Pollen	Conifer pollen, family Cupressaceae	
Ginkgocycadophytus	G. nitidus	LM494, Demnate	Pollen	Ginkgoales or Cycad pollen	
Ichyosporites	I. sp.	LM494, Demnate	Spores	Lycopodiaceae or Anemiaceae	
Leptolepidites	L. verrucatus	LM494, Demnate	Spores	Ferns spores of the family Dennstaedtiaceae	Modern Dennstaedtiaceae
Matonisporites	M. sp.	LM494, Demnate	Spores	Ferns spores of the family Matoniaceae	Modern Matoniaceae
Perinopollenites	P. sp.	LM494, Demnate	Pollen	Conifer pollen, family Cupressaceae	
Perotrilites	P. granulatus	LM494, Demnate	Spores	Ferns spores of the family Marsileaceae	Modern Marsileaceae
Rotverrusporites	R. tenuis	LM494, Demnate	Pollen	Ferns spores of the family Ophioglossaceae	Modern Ophioglossaceae
Spheripollenites	S. psilatus	LM494, Demnate	Pollen	Conifer pollen of the family Hirmeriellaceae	
Spheripollenites	S. cf. subgranulatus	LM494, Demnate	Pollen	Conifer pollen of the family Hirmeriellaceae	
Todisporites	T. major	LM494, Demnate	Spores	Ferns spores of the family Osmundaceae	Modern Osmundaceae
Tuberositriletes	T. sp.	LM494, Demnate	Spores	Ferns spores of the family Lygodiaceae	

== See also ==
- List of dinosaur-bearing rock formations
- Anoual Formation
- El Mers Formation
- Iouaridène Formation
