= Viavii =

Online marketplace

ViaVii
- Type: Marketplace
- Founded: 2016
- Founders: Rola Fayyad, Ibrahim Abu Rajab, Ramzi Madanat
- Headquarters: Jordan
- Number of employees: 40
- Website: viavii.com

Viavii is an online community marketplace that allows people to explore, book and host in-person and online experiences from all around the world. The experiential travel platform offers experiences and itineraries that are adjustable on-the-move, while connecting users with residents of their destination at any time. Based in Amman, Jordan, Viavii also has offices in Qatar.

Viavii is a Google start-up that uses technologies such as artificial intelligence and machine learning for a personalised user experience. The platform can be accessed via website and will soon be available as an application for android and IOS. Users can set up an account to either host or book experiences. Viavii only receives commission from each experience sold as it does not own any of the experiences listed on the website.

== History ==
The company was founded in 2016 by Rola Fayyad under the name “friendture", with the initial idea of creating a mobile application for group travellers and friends to plan and organise their trips together. Due to the change in consumer behaviour, Viavii was launched in January 2019, to enable travellers to explore new places and cultures while connecting with locals and likeminded people.

As part of their corporate social responsibility and social impact, they connect local communities who often lack an online presence with travellers who are looking for immersive local-led activities. In 2019, they started a social project called ViaVii Locals that aims to encourage and support entrepreneurs (particularly women and youth) to build sustainable tourism businesses in rural communities. By 2020, the company had obtained an “undisclosed amount” of seed money, and it has been shared that Tech Venture Fund by QSTP is a lead investor.

ViaVii was also citied as "was able to adapt and began focusing on creating a safe alternative to travel."

== Online experiences ==
Viavii launched the feature online experiences and entered the market of fully digitised experiences in 2020 as a response to the COVID-19 pandemic. Online experiences are considered an alternative to travel, as they entertain people quarantining at home, while also posing an opportunity for service providers to still make money despite travel restrictions.

== 2022 FIFA World Cup ==
Viavii was one of the ten winners of challenge 22, the Supreme Committee for Delivery & Legacy’s flagship innovation programme. The competition provides an opportunity for participants in the Arab region to display their innovative start-ups, and target the football fans and visitors who will be attending the 2022 FIFA World Cup in Qatar.

Viavii is expected to provide its services to the fans during the 2022 world cup. An AI-based itinerary planner powered by Viavii is scheduled to be integrated into Qatar’s most prominent websites to help newcomers and residents navigate exploring Qatar. As they highlight the region’s culture, their focus will also be contributing to a digitised and more innovative future for tourism. In recognition of its role in the digitization of the experiences economy in Qatar, Viavii was https://www.mcit.gov.qa/sites/default/files/fifa_world_cup_qatar_2022tm_-_mcit_connected_tournament_-_a_digital_legacy_english-1.pdf?TSPD_101_R0=0893829855ab2000bd4fd4d5224b12ba474f76ebac1ff8a61b603bbf9d0a748dcc8a847ad789432e08a96f0f9a1430008a716a6d0d2e199c2a8a947035e6be1c66a6b0163c9c22e30a547576c3b7e5c29866fbce1b0a456499345fee2b3319a9, Qatar. This commendation was particularly for the company's partnership with the Supreme Committee for Delivery & Legacy in conjunction with the FIFA World Cup Qatar 2022.

== Locations ==
Viavii operates in the following locations worldwide:

Africa

- Egypt: Cairo
- Kenya: Limuru, Masaai, Mombasa, Nakuru, Nairobi
- Morocco: Agadir, Casablanca, Marrakesh, Merzouga, Ouzoud

Asia

- India: Agra, Mumbai, New Delhi
- Indonesia: Bali
- Jordan: Ajloun, Amman, Aqaba, As-Salt, Al-Karak, Balqa, Beidha, Bussiara, Humayma, Irbid, Jerash, Northern Valley, Pella, Petra, Shobak, Tafilah, Umm Qais, Wadi Araba, Wadi Rum
- Lebanon: Beirut
- Oman: Muscat, Salalah
- Qatar: Al Khor, Al Wakrah, Al-Shahaniya, Doha, Mesaieed
- Saudi Arabia: Abha, An Nafud, Alula, Hail city, Jizan, Jeddah, King Abdullah Economic City, Neom, Riyadh, Tabuk, Taif, Umluj, Wadi Al-Dawasir, White Volcano
- Thailand: Krabi, Pattaya, Phuket
- Turkey: Ankara, Antalya, Cappadocia, Istanbul, İzmir, Kuşadası, Pamukkale
- United Arab Emirates: Abu Dhabi, Dubai, Fujairah, Ras Al Khaimah, Sharjah

Europe

- France: Paris
- Greece: Athens, Crete, Santorini, Thessaloniki
- Italy: Rome
- Portugal: Lisbon
- Spain: Barcelona, Seville
- United Kingdom: London

North America

- Canada: Montreal
- Cuba: Havana
- Mexico: Mérida
