= Tilougguit Formation =

- Stratigraphic range: early Bathonian; ~168–166 Ma
- Type: Geological formation
- Underlies: Guettioua & El Mers Formations
- Overlies: Bin El Ouidane Formation

Lithology
- Primary: Marl, sandstone

Location
- Coordinates: 32.1°N 6.5°W
- Approximate paleocoordinates: 28.1°N 4.5°W
- Region: Azilal
- Country: Morocco
- Extent: High Atlas

Type section
- Named for: Tilougguite
- Tilougguit Formation (Morocco)

The Tilougguit Formation, also known as the Tillouguit Formation, is an Early Bathonian geologic formation in Morocco. Fossils of an indeterminate sauropod are known from the formation, in addition to fossil tracks made by a theropod and a quadrupedal dinosaur—either a stegosaur or a sauropod.

== See also ==
- List of dinosaur-bearing rock formations
  - List of stratigraphic units with indeterminate dinosaur fossils
- Geology of Morocco
