= Tanant =

Coordinates: 31°52′N 6°57′W

Tanant ⵜⴰⵏⴰⵏⵜ تنانت
- Rural commune and town
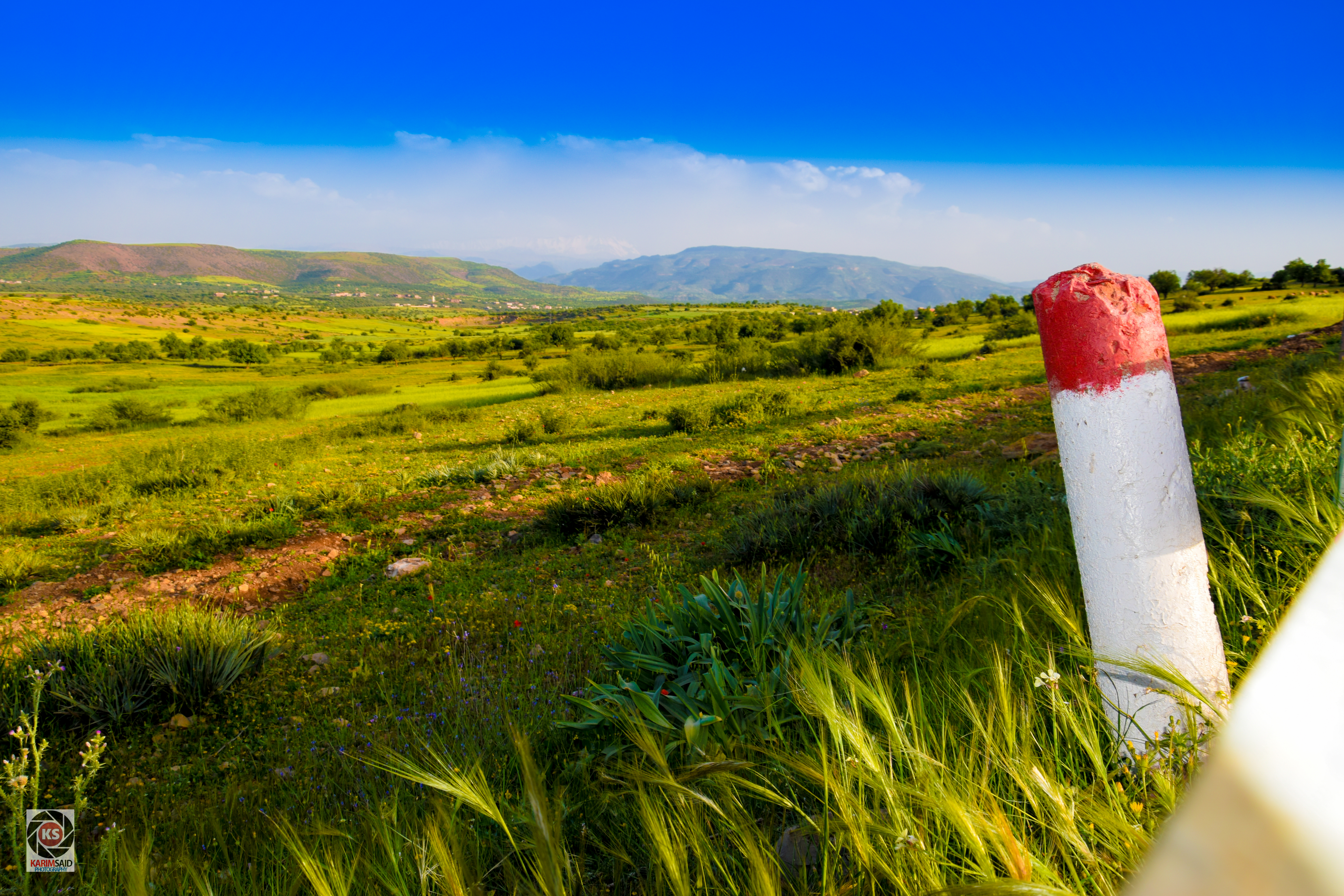
- Interactive map of Tanant
- Country: Morocco
- Region: Béni Mellal-Khénifra
- Province: Azilal

Population (2004)
  - Total: 10,007
- Time zone: UTC+0 (GMT)

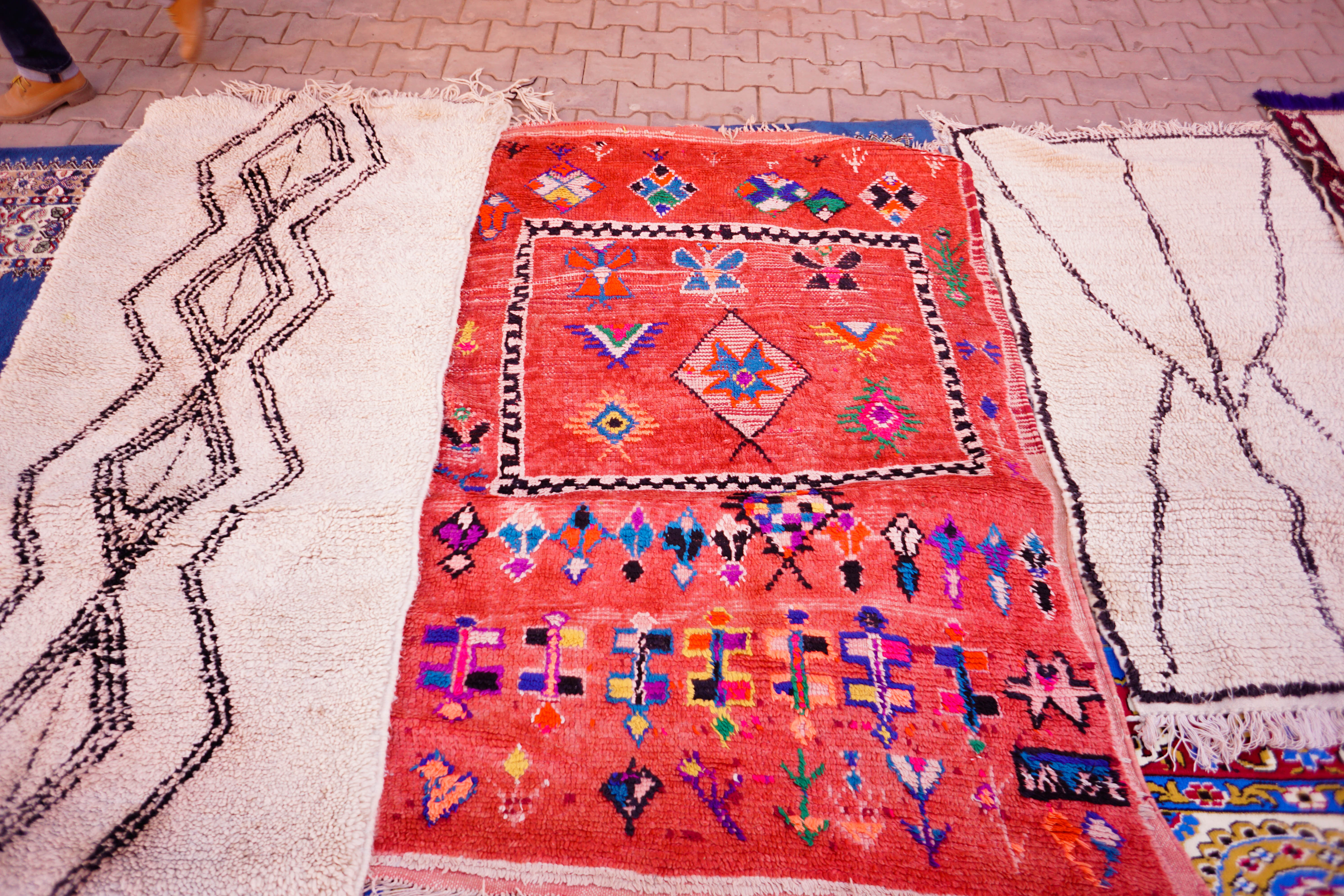
Traditional Rugs from Ait Bougemez and Ait M'hamed

Tanant is a small town and rural commune in Azilal Province, Béni Mellal-Khénifra, Morocco. At the time of the 2004 census, the commune had a total population of 10,007 people living in 1,730 households.

The town is home to a historic French fort, which was used as a military base during the protectorate.

It is situated at the base of the High Atlas Mountains and is known today for its production of olives, olive oil, honey, and almonds.

There is a primary school, middle school, and high school along with several Islamic pre-schools and women's literacy programs.

In 2011, the Ministry of Youth and Sports built a Dar Chebab center for youth and appointed a director from the commune to run regular programming. The Dar Chebab has a theater stage, speakers and microphones, musical instruments, a classroom and small library installed by an American Peace Corps Volunteer in 2018. The library includes approximately 1,500 books in Arabic, English, and French and two computers. Currently, beginner English classes are held at the Dar Chebab theater.

The commune is run by Driss Akermouche, a native of Rabat who has run several programs for the town and invited humanitarian aid associations to address poverty in the region.

In the summer of 2018, Tanant hosted its first modern moussem or horse-riding fantasia. Teams representing villages across the region come to compete in the events and preserve the cultural tradition.

In the center of town, there is a grand taxi stand and bus station. Transportation is available to all parts of the country.

Tanant is located along route 304 between Demnate and Azilal. It is near to the Cascades d'Ouzoud, the tallest waterfalls in Morocco.

In the nearby town of Ait Taguella, tagine clay pots are crafted. Many traditional carpets are woven by women in homes throughout the region.

The primary languages spoken are Tashelhit (Shilha), a Berber language, and Moroccan Arabic (Darija).
