= Imlil =

Imlil may refer to one of two villages in Morocco:

- Imlil, Al Haouz
- Imlil, Azilal
