= Bin El Ouidane =

- Rural commune and town
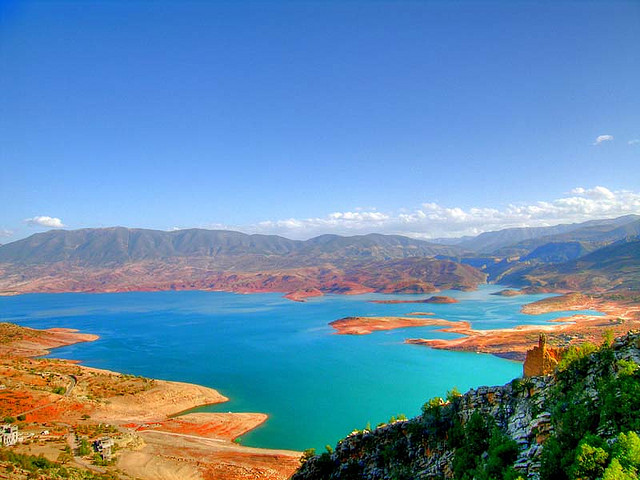
- Panoramic view of the artificial lake of Bin el Oiudane located 1 km east of the village of the same name
- Interactive map of Bin El Ouidane
- Coordinates: 32°6′30″N 6°28′30″W
- Country: Morocco
- Region: Béni Mellal-Khénifra
- Province: Azilal
- Elevation: 850 m (2,790 ft)

Population (2004)
  - Total: 5,721
- Time zone: UTC+0 (GMT)

Bin El Ouidane is a small town and rural commune in Azilal Province, Béni Mellal-Khénifra, Morocco. At the time of the 2004 census, the commune had a total population of 5721 people living in 958 households.
