= Sidi Yacoub, Morocco =

Coordinates: 31°40′N 7°04′W

Sidi Yacoub
- Rural commune and town
- Interactive map of Sidi Yacoub
- Country: Morocco
- Region: Tadla-Azilal
- Province: Azilal Province

Population (2004)
  - Total: 16,637
- Time zone: UTC+0 (GMT)

Sidi Yacoub is a small town and rural commune in Azilal Province of the Tadla-Azilal region of Morocco. At the time of the 2004 census, the commune had a total population of 16,637 people living in 2,234 households.
