= Ait Abbas =

- Rural commune and town
- Location within Morocco
- Coordinates: 32°20′N 06°21′W
- Country: Morocco
- Region: Tadla-Azilal
- Province: Azilal Province

Population (2004)
  - Total: 10,391
- Time zone: UTC+0 (GMT)

Ait Abbas is a small town and rural commune in Azilal Province of the Tadla-Azilal region of Morocco. At the time of the 2004 census, the commune had a total population of 10,391 people living in 1,460 households.
