= Sidi Boulkhalf =

Sidi Boulkhalf سيدي بوخالف
- Rural commune and town
- Location within Morocco
- Coordinates: 31.7275°N 6.833889°W
- Country: Morocco
- Region: Tadla-Azilal
- Province: Azilal Province

Population (2004)
  - Total: 13,149
- Time zone: UTC+0 (GMT)

Sidi Boulkhalf is a small town and rural commune in Azilal Province of the Tadla-Azilal region of Morocco. At the time of the 2004 census, the commune had a total population of 13,149 people living in 1,733 households.
