= Ait Majden =

Ait Majden is a small town and rural commune in Azilal Province of the Tadla-Azilal region of Morocco. At the time of the 2004 census, the commune had a total population of 15,831 people living in 2,564 households.
