= Judeo-Berber language =

Group of Berber-language varieties

Judeo-Berber
- Judeo-Shilha
- Region: Israel, France, Canada
- Native speakers: 200 (2023)
- Language family: Afro-Asiatic: Berber; Northern; Atlas; Shilha; Judeo-Berber
- Writing system: Hebrew alphabet (generally not written)

Language codes
- ISO 639-3: jbe
- Glottolog: (insufficiently attested or not a distinct language) jude1262
- Map of Judeo Berber speaking communities in the first half of the 20th century

Judeo-Berber is the language and dialects formed in Berber Jewish communities of central and southern Morocco where Berber dialects were common. Judeo-Berber was the primary, if not the only, language used by many in Berber Jewish communities, though others used primarily Judeo-Arabic. The language arose as a result of Arabic-speaking Jews getting in touch with Berber languages. It is also called Judeo-Amazigh, Judeo-Tamazight, and Jewish Amazigh.

Its speakers immigrated to Israel in the 1950s and 1960s. While mutually comprehensible with the Tamazight spoken by most inhabitants of the area (Galand-Pernet et al. 1970:14), these varieties are distinguished by the use of Hebrew loanwords and the pronunciation of š as /s/, contrary to Judeo-Moroccan Arabic.

== History ==
The first indication of Jews speaking any Berber language only appears in the early 19th century and it's of rural Jews in Jebel Nefusa and Saharan Ghardaia.

As of 1912, about 8,000 of Moroccan Jews spoke Judeo-Berber. The language was spoken in the country's Berber or partly Berber rural and mountainous areas. According to a 1936 survey, approximately 145,700 of Morocco's 161,000 Jews spoke a variety of Berber (though not specifically Judeo-Berber), 25,000 of whom were reportedly monolingual in a Berber language.

Due to the mass migration of Moroccan Jews after the 1948 Arab-Israeli war, the number of speakers declined as the language was not passed down to new speakers, leaving it with only about 200 speakers left in France and Israel as of 2023.

== Usage ==
Apart from its daily use, Judeo-Berber was used for orally explaining religious texts, and only occasionally written, using Hebrew characters; a Pesah Haggadah manuscript written in Judeo-Berber has been reprinted (Galand-Pernet et al. 1970.) A few prayers, like the Benedictions over the Torah, were recited in Berber.

== Geographic distribution ==
Communities in Morocco where Jews spoke Judeo-Berber included Tinghir, Ouijjane, Asaka, Imini, Draa valley, Demnate and Ait Bou Oulli in the Tamazight-speaking Middle Atlas and High Atlas and Oufrane, Tiznit and Illigh in the Tashelhiyt-speaking Souss valley (Galand-Pernet et al. 1970:2). Jews were living among tribal Berbers, often in the same villages, and practiced old tribal Berber protection relationships.

== Phonology ==
Consonants
		Labial	Bilabial	Dental-Alveolar	Alveolar	Post-Alveolar	Palatal	Velar	Uvular	Pharyngeal	Laryngeal
Plosive	Unvoiced		p	t				k	q		
Plosive	Voiced		b	d				g			
Nasals			m	n							
Fricative	Unvoiced				s	ʃ		x		ħ	h
Fricative	Voiced				z	ʒ		ɣ		ʕ	
Trill				r							
Lateral					l						
Approximant	Voiced	w					j				

Vowels
	Front	Central	Back
Close	i		u
Mid		ǝ	
Open-mid			
Open	a		

Judeo-Berber is characterized by the following phonetic phenomena:

- Centralized pronunciation of /i u/ as [ɨ ʉ]
- Neutralization of the distinction between /s ʃ/, especially among monolingual speakers
- Delabialization of labialized velars (/kʷ gʷ xʷ ɣʷ/), e.g. nəkkʷni/nukkni > nəkkni 'us, we'
- Insertion of epenthetic [ə] to break up consonant clusters
- Frequent diphthong insertion, as in Judeo-Arabic
- Some varieties have q > kʲ and dˤ > tˤ, as in the local Arabic dialects
- In the eastern Sous Valley region, /l/ > [n] in both Judeo-Berber and Arabic

== Lexicon ==
The lexicon of Judeo-Berber is the same as that of regular Shilha, except it has Hebrew and Judeo-Arabic loanwords. This lack of differentiation from Shilha means it is not a language but rather a dialect. Judeo-Berber lexicon also influenced Judeo-Arabic.

== Sample text ==
Taken from Galand-Pernet et al. 1970:121 (itself from a manuscript from Tinghir):

ixəddamn ay n-ga i pərʿu g° maṣər. i-ss-ufġ aġ əṛbbi ənnəġ dinnaġ s ufus ən ddrʿ, s ufus ikuwan.
servants what we-were for Pharaoh in Egypt. he-cause-leave us God our there with arm of might, with arm strong.
Servants of Pharaoh is what we were in Egypt. Our God brought us out thence with a mighty arm, with a strong arm.

== See also ==
- Judeo-Arabic languages
- Judeo-Moroccan Arabic
- Berber Jews

== Bibliography ==
- P. Galand-Pernet & Haim Zafrani. Une version berbère de la Haggadah de Pesaḥ: Texte de Tinrhir du Todrha (Maroc). Compress rendus du G.L.E.C.S. Supplement I. 1970. (in French)
- Joseph Chetrit. "Jewish Berber," Handbook of Jewish Languages, ed. Lily Kahn & Aaron D. Rubin. Leiden: Brill. 2016. Pages 118–129.
