= Ait Oumdis =

- Rural commune and town
- Location within Morocco
- Coordinates: 31°29′45″N 7°03′11″W
- Country: Morocco
- Region: Tadla-Azilal
- Province: Azilal Province

Population (2004)
  - Total: 15,377
- Time zone: UTC+0 (GMT)

Ait Oumdis is a small town and rural commune in Azilal Province of the Tadla-Azilal region of Morocco. At the time of the 2004 census, the commune had a total population of 15,377 people living in 2,066 households.
