= Ait Mazigh =

- Rural commune and town
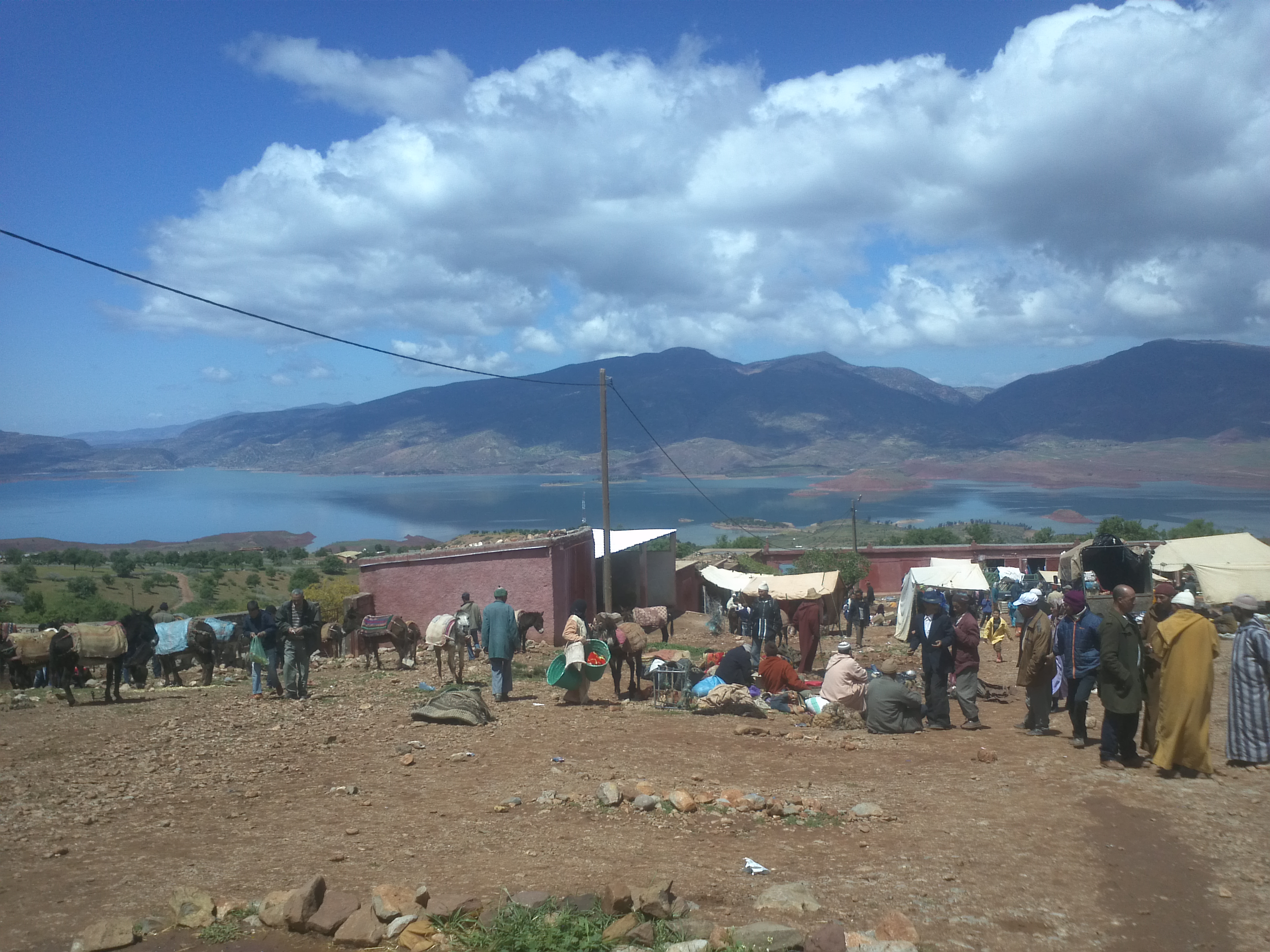
- Ait Mazigh

- Location within Morocco
- Coordinates: 32°04′29″N 6°21′06″W
- Country: Morocco
- Region: Tadla-Azilal
- Province: Azilal Province

Population (2004)
  - Total: 3,185
- Time zone: UTC+0 (GMT)

Ait Mazigh is a small town and rural commune in Azilal Province of the Tadla-Azilal region of Morocco. At the time of the 2004 census, the commune had a total population of 3,185 people living in 552 households.
