= M'hammed Abdenabaoui =

Moroccan magistrate

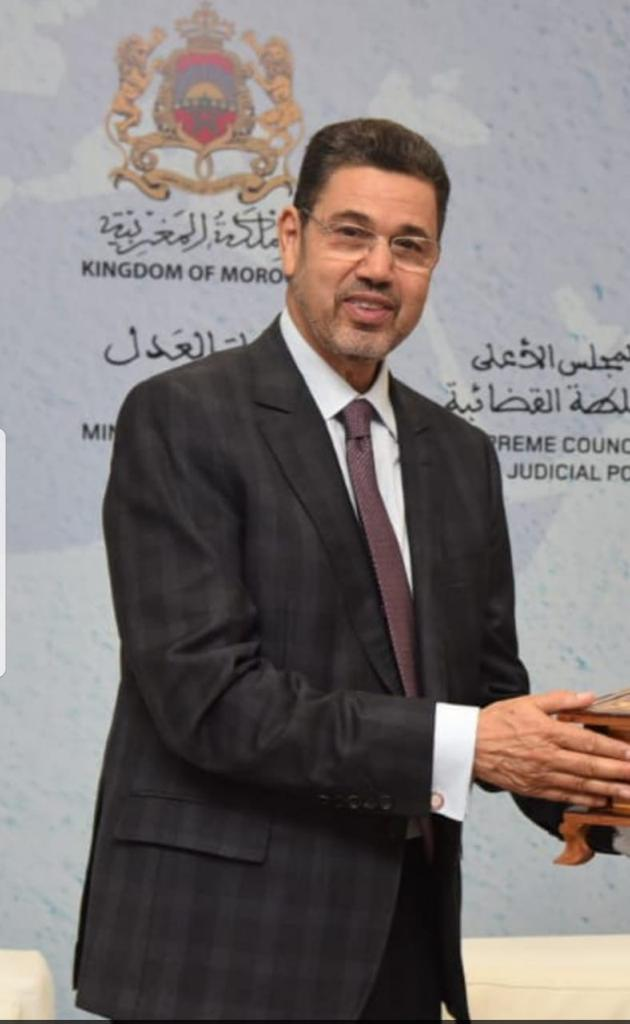
Abdenabaoui in 2019

M'hammed Abdenabaoui (also spelled Abdennabaoui; Arabic: مَحمد عبد النباوي) is a senior Moroccan magistrate and the former attorney general of the King at the Court of Cassation. In 2021, he was appointed by king Mohammed VI as the first President of the Court of Cassation and deputy President of the Supreme Council of the Judicial Power. He's a noted defender of the independence of the judiciary from the legislative and executive branches.

== Early life and education ==
M'hammed Abdenabaoui was born on 21 August 1954 in Khouribga.

Abdenabaoui graduated with a law degree from Mohammed V university (Rabat) in 1978 and completed his early training at the Superior Institute of Judicial Studies in 1979. In 1993, he received a specialized diploma in Administrative Justice from the French National Institute of Judicial Studies (INEJ). In 1999, he earned an Advanced Degree (DESA) in Law from Hassan II university (Casablanca) and, in 2015, a Doctorate in Law with High Honors from Caddi Ayad university (Marrakesh). His thesis on Moroccan law and international conventions on the deportation of criminals was praised by the jury and later published.

== Early career and Ministry of Justice ==
After having worked as a Substitute General Prosecutor in various southern cities (Tan-Tan, Laayoune and Dakhla) in 1979–1980, and as a resident judge in Ouaouizeght until 2004, he acted as the Crown's General Prosecutor before the court of Laayoune (1984–1987), Benslimane (1987–1993), Mohammedia (1993–1997) and, after a passage at the Department of Criminal Affairs and Pardons as a division chief (1997–2000), of Casablanca-Anfa Prefecture (2000–2004).

In 2004–2005, he was an adviser to the minister of Justice on criminal policy, before becoming the Director of Prison Administration and Reinsertion (2005–2007) and the Director of Criminal Affairs and Pardons (2007–2017).

== Crown's General Prosecutor and President of the Prosecutor's Office ==
On 3 April 2017, king Mohammed VI of Morocco appointed him as the attorney general of the King before the nation's Court of Cassation, in which capacity he's a member of the Supreme Council of the Judicial Power and he also presides, since 7 October 2017, over the Prosecutor's Office (Ministère public), now independent from the Ministry of Justice. Since his appointment, he has given strong signals that he will be keeping the judicial branch free from any interference by the legislative and executive branches.

== Response to the COVID-19 pandemic ==
In March 2020, the efforts of his Office to support the Moroccan government's measures to slow down the spread of the SARS-COV-2 virus among the population were noted by the national press, as they led to the systematic prosecution of people publishing "fake news" or violating the lockdown and other measures, such as the wearing of protective masks in public.

== President of the Court of Cassation and Deputy President of the Supreme Council of the Judicial Power ==
On 22 March 2021, during a personal audience, king Mohammed VI of Morocco appointed the former attorney general of the King before the kingdom's highest court, the Court of Cassation, as the first President of the Court of Cassation and, in this capacity, as deputy President of the Supreme Council of the Judicial Power.

== President of the AHJUCAF ==
On 3 July 2025, he is elected unanimously as the President of the Association of High Jurisdictions of Cassation of countries that share the use of French (AHJUCAF), where 49 national highest courts are represented.

== Decorations ==
- Officer of the Wissam Al Arch Order (Morocco, 2012)
- Grand Officer of the Wissam Al Wakafaa Al Watania Order (Morocco, 2013)
- (Hon.) Commander of the Order of Leopold II (Belgium, 2017)
