= JBE =

JBE or jbe may refer to:

- Journal of Business Ethics, a peer-reviewed academic journal published by Springer Nature B.V.
- jbe, the ISO 639-3 code for Judeo-Berber language, Israel
- John Bel Edwards, (born 1966) politician and former governor of Louisiana
