= Iouaridène Formation =

Geologic formation in Morocco

- Stratigraphic range: Middle Jurassic–Early Cretaceous, Callovian–Barremian
- Type: Geological formation
- Underlies: Grès du Djebel Sidal Formation
- Overlies: Guettioua Formation, El Mers Formation

Lithology
- Primary: Mudstone
- Other: Sandstone, conglomerate

Location
- Coordinates: 31.7°N 6.9°W
- Approximate paleocoordinates: 27.8°N 2.5°W
- Region: Azilal Province, Marrakech Province
- Country: Morocco
- Extent: Atlas Mountains
- Iouaridène Formation (Morocco)

The Iouaridène Formation is a Mesozoic geological formation in Morocco. Fossil sauropod, theropod, and stegosaur tracks have been reported from the formation. It is part of the 'Red Beds' of Morocco alongside the Guettioua Sandstone and Jbel Sidal Formation. The lithology consists of cyclic alternation of meter scale red mudstones and 10's of cm scale carbonate cemented mudstones to very fine sandstones. Some of the theropod footprints are massive,up to 90 centimetres (35 in) in length. However the largest of these theropod tracks are badly deformed.

== Ichnofossil content ==
Ichnofossils of the Iouaridène Formation
| Ichnogenus | Ichnospecies | Region | Member | Material | Notes | Image |
| Breviparopus | B. taghbaloutensis | | | | Sauropod tracks | |
| Boutakioutichnium | B. atlasicus | | | | Theropod track | |
| Carmelopodus | C. isp. | | | | Theropod track | |
| Deltapodus | D. isp. | | | | Stegosaurian track | |
| Eubrontes | E. isp. | | | | Theropod track | |
| Eutynichnium | E. atlasipodus | | | | Theropod track | |
| Kayentapus | K. isp. | | | | Theropod track | |
| Megalosauripus | M. isp. | | | | Theropod track | |

== See also ==
- List of dinosaur-bearing rock formations
  - List of stratigraphic units with sauropodomorph tracks
