= Moulay Aissa Ben Driss =

- Rural commune and town
- Interactive map of Moulay Aissa Ben Driss
- Country: Morocco
- Region: Tadla-Azilal
- Province: Azilal Province

Population (2004)
  - Total: 12,621
- Time zone: UTC+0 (GMT)

Moulay Aissa Ben Driss is a small town and rural commune in Azilal Province of the Tadla-Azilal region of Morocco. At the time of the 2004 census, the commune had a total population of 12,621 people living in 2,109 households.
