= Bni Hassane =

Bni Hassane بني حسن
- Rural commune and town
- Interactive map of Bni Hassane
- Coordinates: 32°02′14″N 6°56′46″W
- Country: Morocco
- Region: Tadla-Azilal
- Province: Azilal Province

Population (2004)
  - Total: 11,579
- Time zone: UTC+0 (GMT)

Bni Hassane is a small town and rural commune in Azilal Province of the Tadla-Azilal region of Morocco. At the time of the 2004 census, the commune had a total population of 12,077 (2016) with 1,759 households.
