= Agoudi N'Lkhair =

- Rural commune and town
- Location within Morocco
- Country: Morocco
- Region: Tadla-Azilal
- Province: Azilal Province

Population (2004)
  - Total: 11,745
- Time zone: UTC+0 (GMT)

Agoudi N'Lkhair is a small town and rural commune in Azilal Province of the Tadla-Azilal region of Morocco. At the time of the 2004 census, the commune had a total population of 11745 people living in 1758 households.
