= Ait Blal =

- Rural commune and town
- Location within Morocco
- Coordinates: 31°41′27″N 6°42′59″W
- Country: Morocco
- Region: Tadla-Azilal
- Province: Azilal Province

Population (2004)
  - Total: 6,740
- Time zone: UTC+0 (GMT)

Ait Blal is a small town and rural commune in Azilal Province of the Tadla-Azilal region of Morocco. At the time of the 2004 census, the commune had a total population of 6740 people living in 901 households.
