= Ouaoula =

- Rural commune and town
- Location within Morocco
- Coordinates: 31°52′N 6°45′W
- Country: Morocco
- Region: Béni Mellal-Khénifra
- Province: Azilal Province

Population (2004)
  - Total: 22,022
- Time zone: UTC+0 (GMT)

Ouaoula is a small town and rural commune in Azilal Province of the Tadla-Azilal region of Morocco. At the time of the 2004 census, the commune had a total population of 22,022 people living in 3,040 households.
