= Jubantouja =

Jubantouja or Juba n Touja (Tamazight: ⵊⵓⴱⴰ ⵏ ⵜⵓⵊⴰ), meaning "Juba from the hill", is a Moroccan alternative rock band that performs primarily in the Tamazight (Berber) language. Formed in 2016 in the village of Ait Bouali, located in the Azilal Province of the High Atlas Mountains, the band is known for blending indie rock with traditional Amazigh music styles, such as Taznzart and Rawais.

== History ==
The origins of Jubantouja trace back to 2015, when the founding members were invited by a music producer based in Agadir to record a cover song. Instead, the band chose to perform one of their original compositions in Tamazight. The song became a local hit among listeners in Agadir, a city with a significant Amazigh-speaking population.

Encouraged by this success, the band officially formed in 2016 under the name Jubantouja, paying tribute to Juba II, the ancient Amazigh king. The name also evokes the group's mountainous roots, symbolizing a cultural bridge between historical heritage and modern artistic expression.

== Musical style and popularity ==
Jubantouja is noted for its fusion of alternative and indie rock with traditional Amazigh musical elements. Their sound features electric guitars and rock arrangements combined with High Atlas rhythms and melodies, particularly those derived from local styles like Taznzart and Rawais. Their lyrics often reflect themes related to Amazigh identity, nature, and life in rural Morocco.

The band's popularity grew significantly during the COVID-19 lockdown, as their music began reaching a broader audience through online platforms. Their debut album, released in 2019, further solidified their reputation as a distinctive voice in the Moroccan music scene.

== Members ==
- Ayoub Nabil (vocal and guitar)
- Shahid Nabil (bass)
- Zakaria Ouaghad
- Fadoua Nabil (vocal and clave)
- Yassine Taghia (guitar)
- Yasser Ad
