= Taounza =

- Rural commune and town
- Interactive map of Taounza
- Country: Morocco
- Region: Tadla-Azilal
- Province: Azilal Province

Population (2004)
  - Total: 11,610
- Time zone: UTC+0 (GMT)

Taounza is a small town and rural commune in Azilal Province of the Tadla-Azilal region of Morocco. At the time of the 2004 census, the commune had a total population of 11,610 people living in 1,753 households.
