= Imlil, Azilal =

Coordinates: 31°45′24″N 7°0′38″W

Imlil
- Rural commune and town
- Interactive map of Imlil
- Country: Morocco
- Region: Béni Mellal-Khénifra
- Province: Azilal

Population (2004)
  - Total: 9,796
- Time zone: UTC+0 (GMT)

Imlil is a small town and rural commune in Azilal Province, Béni Mellal-Khénifra, Morocco, located only ~2 kms north of Demnate.

At the time of the 2004 census, the commune had a total population of 9,796 people living in 1,753 households.
