= Tabaroucht =

- Rural commune and town
- Location within Morocco
- Coordinates: 32.134444°N 6.299167°W
- Country: Morocco
- Region: Tadla-Azilal
- Province: Azilal Province

Population (2004)
  - Total: 3,620
- Time zone: UTC+0 (GMT)

Tabaroucht is a small town and rural commune in Azilal Province of the Tadla-Azilal region of Morocco. At the time of the 2004 census, the commune had a total population of 3,620 people living in 606 households.
