= Ahmed Assid =

Moroccan writer

- Ḥmad Ɛaṣid
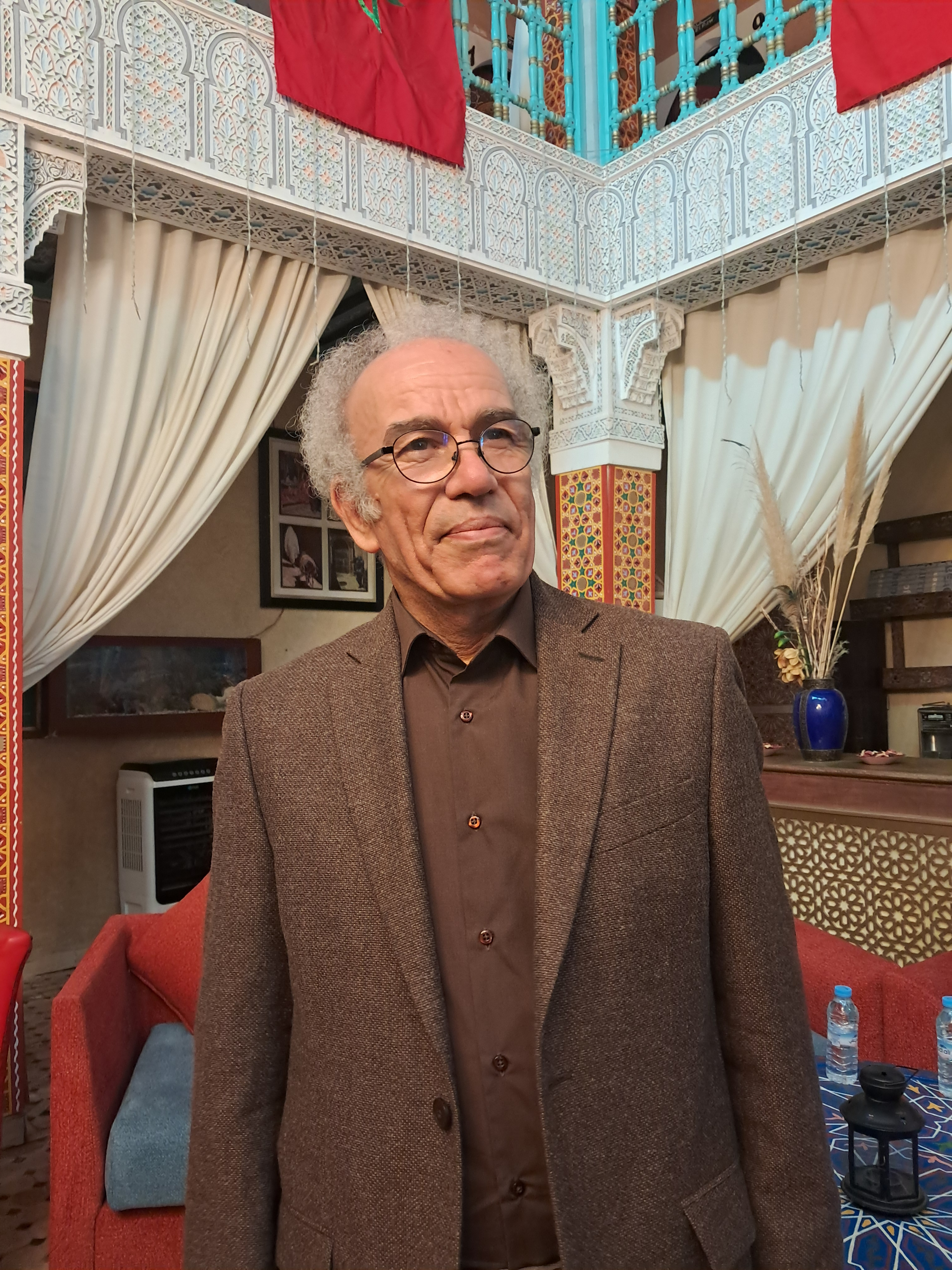
- Ahmed Aassid in Demnate city (May 2026)
- Born: July 14, 1961 (age 65); Taroudant, Morocco
- Citizenship: Moroccan
- Education: Rabat University
- Occupations: Professor, poet, political activist
- Movement: Berberism

Ahmed Assid (Tachelhit: Ḥmad Ɛaṣid, ⴰⵃⵎⴰⴷ ⵄⴰⵚⵉⴷ; born July 14, 1961) is a Moroccan Berber activist, a professor of philosophy, a poet, and a political activist, well known for being an active secularist.

Assid is a secularist, and is well known for his criticism of Muslim fundamentalists and Arabization. In 2013, Assid received death threats several times, and three years later he was on the black list of ISIS and their main target among Moroccan figures.

In 1980, he continued his higher education in Rabat in the Department of Philosophy and Sociology. He graduated from the Faculty of Education Sciences as a Professor of Philosophy in 1988.

== Sexual misconduct allegations ==
In December 2014, Berber activist and writer Malika Mezzane claimed that Ahmed Assid had been harassing her for years. She subsequently revealed a customary "marriage contract" written and signed by Assid, and stated, “He destroyed my house and my life because of the alleged passion he had for me … and was one of the reasons behind my divorce.” After coming under pressure and receiving threats for having denounced Assid, she made public a video of him in her house, as well as a number of photos of them together. Assid refused to answer the allegations and stated that he “[did] not want to discuss individuals' personal life on media.”
