= Tabia =

Tabia may refer to:

- tabia (or tabiya), a term used in chess for a standard position in the opening
- Tabia (building material), a building material was used in ancient China
- Tabia, an administrative division in Ethiopia
- Tabia, Taroudant, town and rural commune of Morocco
- Tabia, Azilal, a town and rural commune of Morocco
- Tabia, Sidi Bel Abbès, a town and commune in Algeria
- Tavium, ancient settlement in Galatia, present-day Turkey
