= Ait Tamlil =

- Rural commune and village
- Location within Morocco
- Coordinates: 31°28′48″N 6°56′24″W
- Country: Morocco
- Region: Tadla-Azilal
- Province: Azilal Province

Population (2004)
  - Total: 18,720
- Time zone: UTC+0 (GMT)

Ait Tamlil is a mountainous village and rural commune in Azilal Province of the Tadla-Azilal region of Morocco. It is located north by road from Toufghine. At the time of the 2004 census, the commune had a total population of 18,720 people living in 2,453 households.
