= Ait Ouaarda =

- Rural commune and town
- Location within Morocco
- Coordinates: 32°07′53″N 6°31′42″W
- Country: Morocco
- Region: Tadla-Azilal
- Province: Azilal Province

Population (2004)
  - Total: 1,786
- Time zone: UTC+0 (GMT)

Ait Ouaarda is a small town and rural commune in Azilal Province of the Tadla-Azilal region of Morocco. At the time of the 2004 census, the commune had a total population of 1786 people living in 273 households.
