= Rfala =

Coordinates: 32°9′46″N 6°46′42″W

- Rural commune and town
- Interactive map of Rfala
- Country: Morocco
- Region: Tadla-Azilal
- Province: Azilal Province

Population (2024)
  - Total: 9,352
- Time zone: UTC+0 (GMT)

Rfala (Berber languages: ⵔⴼⴰⵍⴰ Arabic: ارفالة Arfālah) is a small town and rural commune in Azilal Province of the Tadla-Azilal region of Morocco. At the time of the 2024 census, the commune had a total population of 9,352 people living in 2,187 households.
