= Tagleft =

- Rural commune and town
- Location within Morocco
- Coordinates: 32.238922°N 6.123805°W
- Country: Morocco
- Region: Tadla-Azilal
- Province: Azilal Province

Population (2004)
  - Total: 12,184
- Time zone: UTC+0 (GMT)

Tagleft is a small town and rural commune in Azilal Province of the Béni Mellal-Khénifra region of Morocco. At the time of the 2004 census, the commune had a total population of 12,184 people living in 2,213 households.
