= Foum Jamaa =

- Town
- Location within Morocco
- Coordinates: 31.96°N 6.98°W
- Country: Morocco
- Region: Béni Mellal-Khénifra
- Province: Azilal

Population (2004)
  - Total: 5,360
- Time zone: UTC+0 (GMT)

Foum Jamaa (Arabic: فم الجمعة Berber languages: ⴼⵓⵎ ⵊⵎⵄⴰ Fum Jmɛa) is a town in Azilal Province, Béni Mellal-Khénifra, Morocco. According to the 2004 census it has a population of 5,360.
