= Malika Mezzane =

Moroccan poet

- Born: May 15, 1960 (age 65); Ait Attab, Morocco
- Years active: 2004–2023

Malika Mezzane is a Moroccan poet, a writer, and a Berber rights activist.

== Career ==
Mezzane studied in Fez where she earned a BA degree in philosophy from Sidi Mohamed Ben Abdellah University. She is a former Philosophy teacher. She has published 17 works in 22 publications, in 2 languages. In 1992 she travelled to Switzerland, where she resided for nine years until 2001, during which time she devoted herself to writing on a regular basis, committed to defending human rights in general and those of Maghrebi immigrants in particular. In July 2018, she met the president of Kurdistan, Masoud Barzani. She is also a supporter of the state of Israel and has been outspoken on their right to be in "their homeland".

== Publications ==
=== Poetry ===
Mezzane has written several collections of poems in Arabic:

- Geneva, the other maze (2004)
- If only I could forgive this world (2005)
- If my exile is completed in you (2005)
- When the dead promised us (2006)

=== Novels ===
In 2019, she wrote her first novel "ما أصعب ألا أراك", in which she supports the unification of the Kurds under a single state.
