= Isseksi =

- Rural commune and town
- Interactive map of Isseksi
- Coordinates: 32°14′N 6°17′W
- Country: Morocco
- Region: Béni Mellal-Khénifra
- Province: Azilal

Population (2004)
  - Total: 2,000
- Time zone: UTC+0 (GMT)

Isseksi is a small town and rural commune in Azilal Province, Béni Mellal-Khénifra, Morocco. At the time of the 2004 census, the commune had a total population of 2000 people living in 310 households.
