= Tabia, Azilal =

Tabia Ntifa
- Rural commune and town
- Interactive map of Tabia
- Country: Morocco
- Region: Tadla-Azilal
- Province: Azilal Province

Population (2004)
  - Total: 7,935
- Time zone: UTC+0 (GMT)

Tabia is a small town and rural commune in Azilal Province of the Tadla-Azilal region of Morocco. At the time of the 2004 census, the commune had a total population of 7,935 people living in 1,339 households.
