= Bzou =

Town in Azilal Province, Morocco

Coordinates: 32°05′N 7°03′W

Bzou ⴱⵣⵓ بزو
- Rural commune
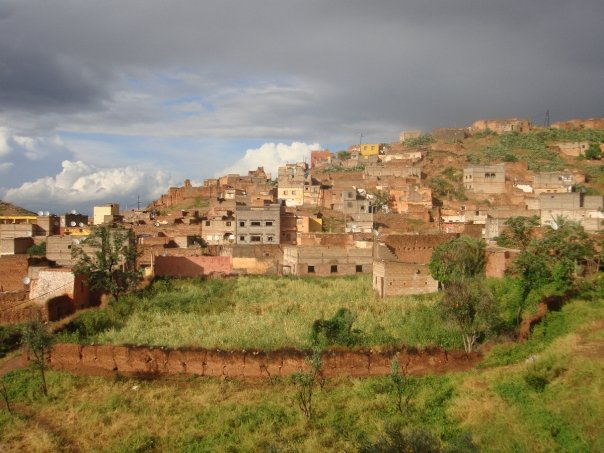
- Interactive map of Bzou
- Country: Morocco
- Region: Béni Mellal-Khénifra
- Province: Azilal

Population (2024)
  - Rural commune: 13,602
  - Urban: 4,014
- Time zone: UTC+0 (GMT)

King Mohammed VI (right) wearing the Bzioui Jellaba

Bzou (Arabic: بزو; Standard Moroccan Tamazight: ⴱⵣⵓ) is a Rural commune and town in the northwest corner of Morocco’s Azilal Province, just off the main road between the major cities of Beni-Mellal and Marrakesh. The sprawling commune of Bzou is composed of various Berber and Arabic-speaking douars (hamlets) tucked into the foothills of the High Atlas Mountains. The main, Arabic speaking cluster of douars (Lamdarssa, Aghbalu, Bahi) forms Bzou's heart; on its flanks are an assortment of smaller, generally Berber douars up in the surrounding mountains and cradling the banks of the river Oued el Abid.

With a population of approximately 4,200 people in its center and 14,505 in the commune as a whole, Bzou is regionally and nationally famous for its production of the highest quality fabric used in the tailoring of a specific piece of traditional Moroccan clothing known as Jellaba. Additionally, Bzou produces a considerable amount of olives, olive oil, and honey. Economically speaking, Bzou is heavily dependent on this basic agriculture and the extremely labor-intensive, handmade fabric for which it is famous.

== Etymology ==
One of the prevalent theories concerning the name of the town is that it was derived from the Berber root word "lbz" which refers to the process of spinning silk thread. This theory thus connects Bzou's history as a town of weavers to the origin of its name. Other theories concerning the name of the town is that it either came from the word “afza/afzu” in Berber meaning roughly “limestone” or it came from the word “abzaw” which refers to a honey-like shade of colour

== Short history ==
According to a plethora of local sources, Bzou's original core and souk (marketplace) were in the Amazigh douar of Tagounte. Cresting a modest hill overlooking the Oued al Abid River on one side and a valley of caves on the other, Tagounte was the center of business and social activity for much of Bzou's history despite its moderate size. Relatively recently (mid 1900s), the economy of the douar, and in many ways Bzou, was driven by the presence of various merchant Jewish families who bought and sold an assortment of products, providing the area with much needed commerce. Today only one member remains, living in Foum Teghia and still dealing with commerce. Bzou is historically referenced in Jewish tradition as a poor place with limited resources, as told by Rabbi Simon Serfaty "בז׳ו בזויה מכל הארצות - קוסקוס בבוקר, קוסקוס בערב, עד ששכחתי ברכת המזון" - meaning "In Bzou, Eating Couscous morning and evening, so much that I've forgotten Birkat Hamazon".

Eventually, the limited accessibility and physical growth potential of Tagounte shifted the center over to the sprawling cluster of douars where it currently resides. This current day center hosts two small souikas per week (the large, traditional souk is down the road in BaHi) and is located on the main paved road, which is under expansion.

== Leo Africanus ==
Describing Bzou in his 16th-century work A Geographical Historie of Africa, Moroccan author, traveler and diplomat Leo Africanus (al-Hasan ibn Muhammad al-Wazzan al-Fasi) wrote:

THE ancient towne of Bzo is built vpon an high hill about twenty miles [30 km] westward from the towne last mentioned. Within three miles [5 km] of Bzo runneth the foresaid riuer of Guadelhabid. The townesmen are honest people, exercising merchandize, and going decently apparelled : To them which inhabite the deserts they carie cloth, oile, and leather. Their mountaines abound with oliues, come, and all kinde of fruits : and of their grapes they make euery yeere most excellent and sweete raisins. Figs they haue great plentie : and their walnut-trees are so high, that a puttocke may securely builde his nest vpon the tops : for it is impossible for any man to climbe vp. On each side of the way which leadeth from hence to the riuer Guadelhabid there are most pleasant and beautiful gardens. My selfe (I remember) was here present when their oranges, figs, and other fruits were growen to ripenes; and was entertained by a certaine priest, who dwelt not farre from a stately Mahumetan temple, standing by that riuer which runneth through the market-place of the towne.

== Attractions ==
On the way to the famous waterfalls at Ouzoud, Bzou is a place to spend a day or two on an environmental tour of Morocco. There are various day hikes to the smaller mountain douars and to the riverside hills which overlook the valley. In the summer, Bzou's main attraction, "Temda", blossoms into a hangout spot for locals and tourists. A small natural pond fed by runoff from the river Oued el Abid, Temda is flanked by cafés, trees and flowers up and around the rock face which surround it. Since summer heat fades only in the evening and the light lingers relatively late, this cool shady retreat remains a local hot spot into the night.

Another regional summer attraction is the town's annual festival in July–August. The festival, or moussem, features traditional music, theater and fantasia as well as a wide display of local artisans' products. Numerous local painters, potters and craftsmen put their stock up for sale, but the marquee item is sure to be Bzou's own high quality djellaba material, made entirely by hand with traditional methods, exclusively in this region.

=== Fantasia ===
Fantasia is a traditional equestrian performance practiced during cultural festivals throughout Morocco. It consists of a group of horse riders, wearing traditional clothes and charging along a straight path at the same speed so as to form a line. At the end of the ride (about two hundred meters) all riders fire in the sky using old gunpowder guns. The difficulty of the performance is synchronization during the acceleration and especially during firing so that one single shot is heard.

== List of douars within the commune ==
- Lamdarssa
- Dowar Shms
- Foum Teghia
- Foum Sheaba
- BaHi
- Akkermoud
- Ait BaHou
- Ait Wagin
- Ait Rabat
- Mazouz
- Ait Atmouli
- Iferghess
- Tamkdite
- Bal
- Aghbalou
- Achbarou
- Laataf
- Taashou
- Tagount
- Ikayen
- Tin Firt
- Argue
- Zalguen
- Oued el Abid
- Moughyaye
- Lekesser
- Nzala
- Ait Ali Oulhaj
- Lhafra
- Sheaba Hamra
- Tarkoukou
- Zangar
- Tinoualine
- Ouaourint
