= Anzou =

- Rural commune and town
- Location within Morocco
- Coordinates: 31.6753°N 7.2672°W
- Country: Morocco
- Region: Béni Mellal-Khénifra
- Province: Azilal

Population (2004)
  - Total: 13,784
- Time zone: UTC+0 (GMT)

Anzou is a small town and rural commune in Azilal Province, Béni Mellal-Khénifra, Morocco. At the time of the 2004 census, the commune had a total population of 13,784 people living in 2,021 households.
