= Tabant =

Coordinates: 31.6581°N 6.4200°W

- Rural commune and town
- Ait Bouguemez, the "Happy valley"
- Interactive map of Tabant
- Country: Morocco
- Region: Béni Mellal-Khénifra
- Province: Azilal

Population (2014)
  - Total: 14,963
- Time zone: UTC+0 (GMT)

Tabant is a small town and rural commune in Azilal Province, Béni Mellal-Khénifra, Morocco. At the time of the 2014 census, the commune had a total population of 14,963 people living in 2194 households.
