= Timoulilt =

Coordinates: 32°12′N 6°28′W

- Rural commune and town
- Interactive map of Timoulilt
- Country: Morocco
- Region: Béni Mellal-Khénifra
- Province: Azilal

Population (2004)
  - Total: 6,110
- Time zone: UTC+0 (GMT)

Timoulilt is a small town and rural commune in Azilal Province, Béni Mellal-Khénifra, Morocco. At the time of the 2004 census, the commune had a total population of 6110 people living in 1193 households.
