= Ait Bouguemez =

Coordinates: 31°39′40″N 6°26′38″W

View of the valley

Ait Bouguemez is a valley in the Central High Atlas Mountains in the Tabant Commune, Azilal Province, Morocco. It is nicknamed "Happy Valley."
