= Tidili Fetouaka =

- Rural commune and town
- Interactive map of Tidili Fetouaka
- Country: Morocco
- Region: Béni Mellal-Khénifra
- Province: Azilal Province

Population (2004)
  - Total: 11,883
- Time zone: UTC+0 (GMT)

Tidili Fetouaka is a small town and rural commune in Azilal Province of the Béni Mellal-Khénifra region of Morocco. At the time of the 2004 census, the commune had a total population of 11,883 people living in 1,824 households.
