= Ait Bou Oulli =

- Rural commune and town
- Location within Morocco
- Coordinates: 31°36′11″N 6°36′13″W
- Country: Morocco
- Region: Tadla-Azilal
- Province: Azilal Province

Population (2004)
  - Total: 9,493
- Time zone: UTC+0 (GMT)

Ait Bou Oulli is a small town and rural commune in Azilal Province of the Tadla-Azilal region of Morocco. At the time of the 2004 census, the commune had a total population of 9493 people living in 1168 households.
