= Tiffert N'Ait Hamza =

Coordinates: 32°18′N 5°58′W

- Rural commune and town
- Interactive map of Tiffert N'Ait Hamza
- Country: Morocco
- Region: Béni Mellal-Khénifra
- Province: Azilal

Population (2004)
  - Total: 3,023
- Time zone: UTC+0 (GMT)

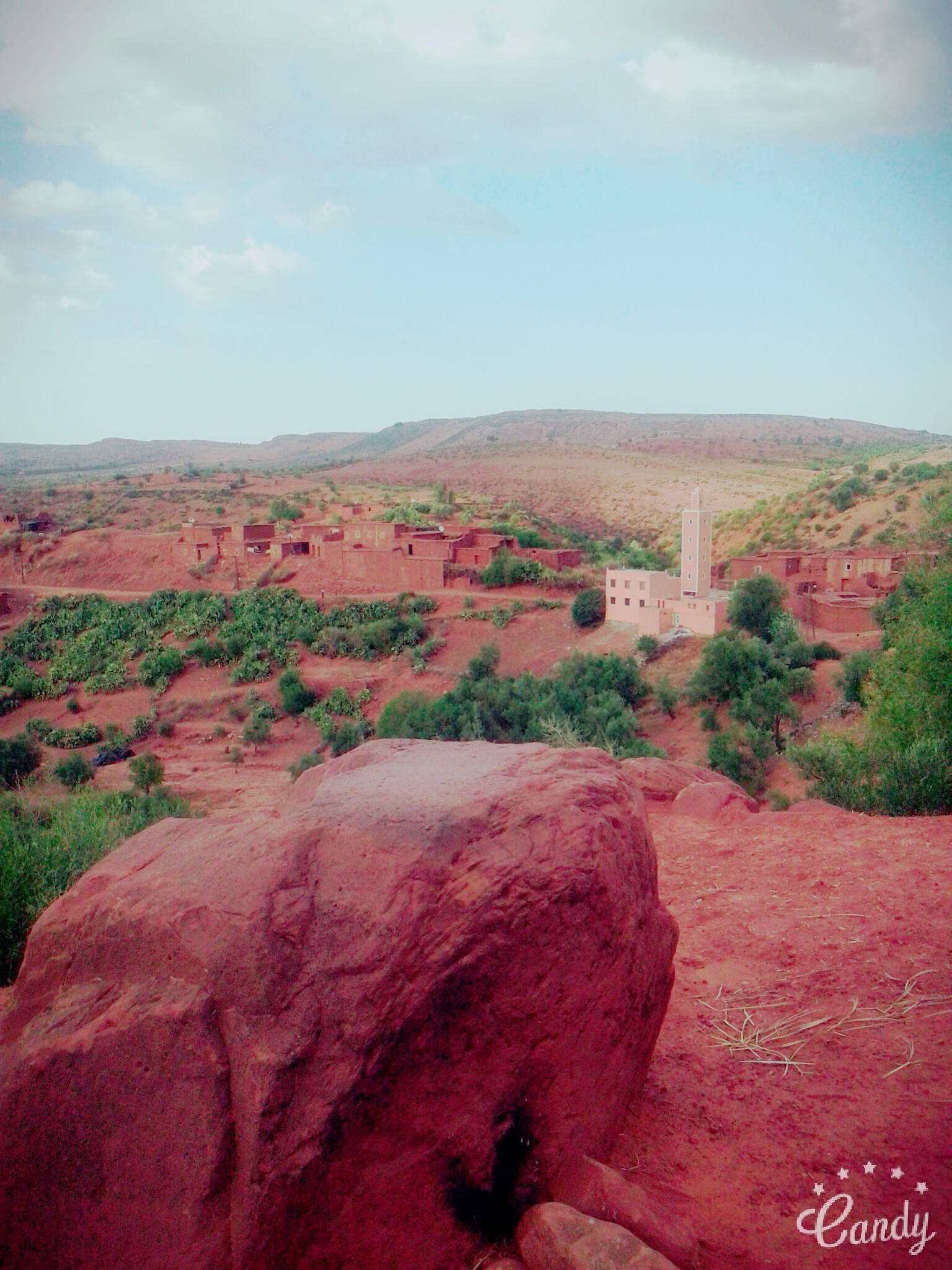
Ait Hamza

Tiffert N'Ait Hamza is a small town and rural commune in Azilal Province, Béni Mellal-Khénifra, Morocco. At the time of the 2004 census, the commune had a total population of 3023 people living in 546 households.
