= Tilougguite =

Coordinates: 32°02′N 6°12′W

- Rural commune and town
- Imsfrane is a 1868m high mountain, called 'the cathedral' for its silhouette from some angles
- Interactive map of Tilougguite
- Country: Morocco
- Region: Béni Mellal-Khénifra
- Province: Azilal

Population (2004)
  - Total: 9,610
- Time zone: UTC+0 (GMT)

Tilougguite is a small town and rural commune in Azilal Province, Béni Mellal-Khénifra, Morocco. At the time of the 2004 census, the commune had a total population of 9610 people living in 1779 households.
