= Ouaouizeght =

Coordinates: 32°09′36″N 6°21′00″W

- Rural commune and town
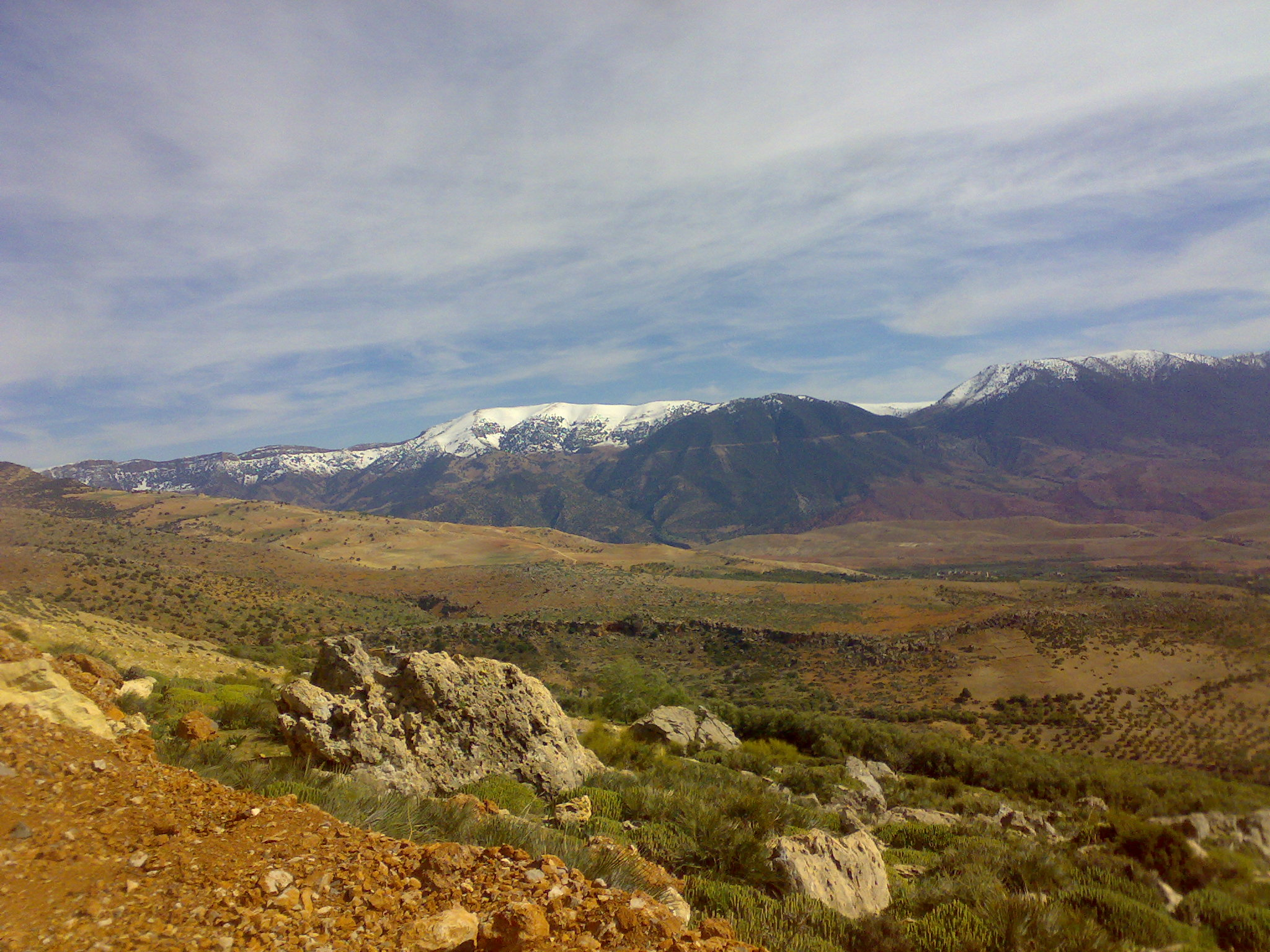
- Interactive map of Ouaouizeght
- Country: Morocco
- Region: Béni Mellal-Khénifra
- Province: Azilal

Population (2004)
  - Total: 13,940
- Time zone: UTC+0 (GMT)

Ouaouizeght is a small town and rural commune in Azilal Province, Béni Mellal-Khénifra, Morocco. At the time of the 2004 census, the commune had a total population of 13,940 people living in 2,885 households.
