= Social impact =

Social impact may refer to:

- Social impact assessment
- Social impact bond
- Social impact theory
- Social influence
- Corporate social responsibility
