= El-Abid River =

River in Morocco

Coordinates: 32°17′25.13″N 7°03′06.02″W

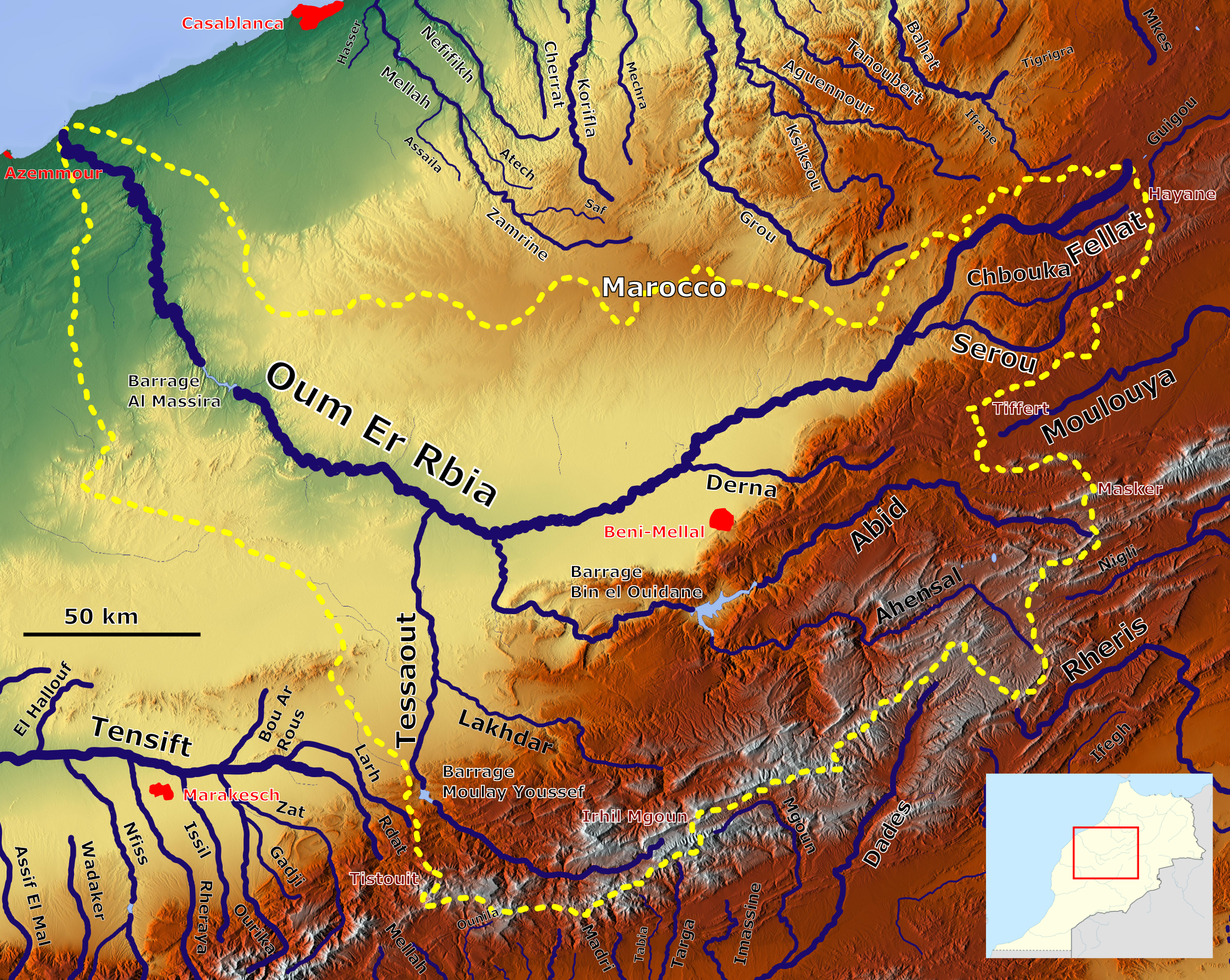
The catchment area of the Oum er-Rbia with the Oued El Abid (bottom right center)

The El Abid River (Arabic: وادي العبيد, romanized: Oued El Abid (Arabic for "Slaves' River") is a river in Morocco, near Douar El. The El-Abid River has an average elevation of 40 metres (130 ft) above sea level. It rises in the High Atlas Mountains and enters the Atlantic Ocean at Azemmour.

== See also ==
- Oued El Abid, Tunisia
