= Azilal =

Provincial capital of Azilal, Morocco

Azilal ⴰⵣⵉⵍⴰⵍ / أزيلال
- City
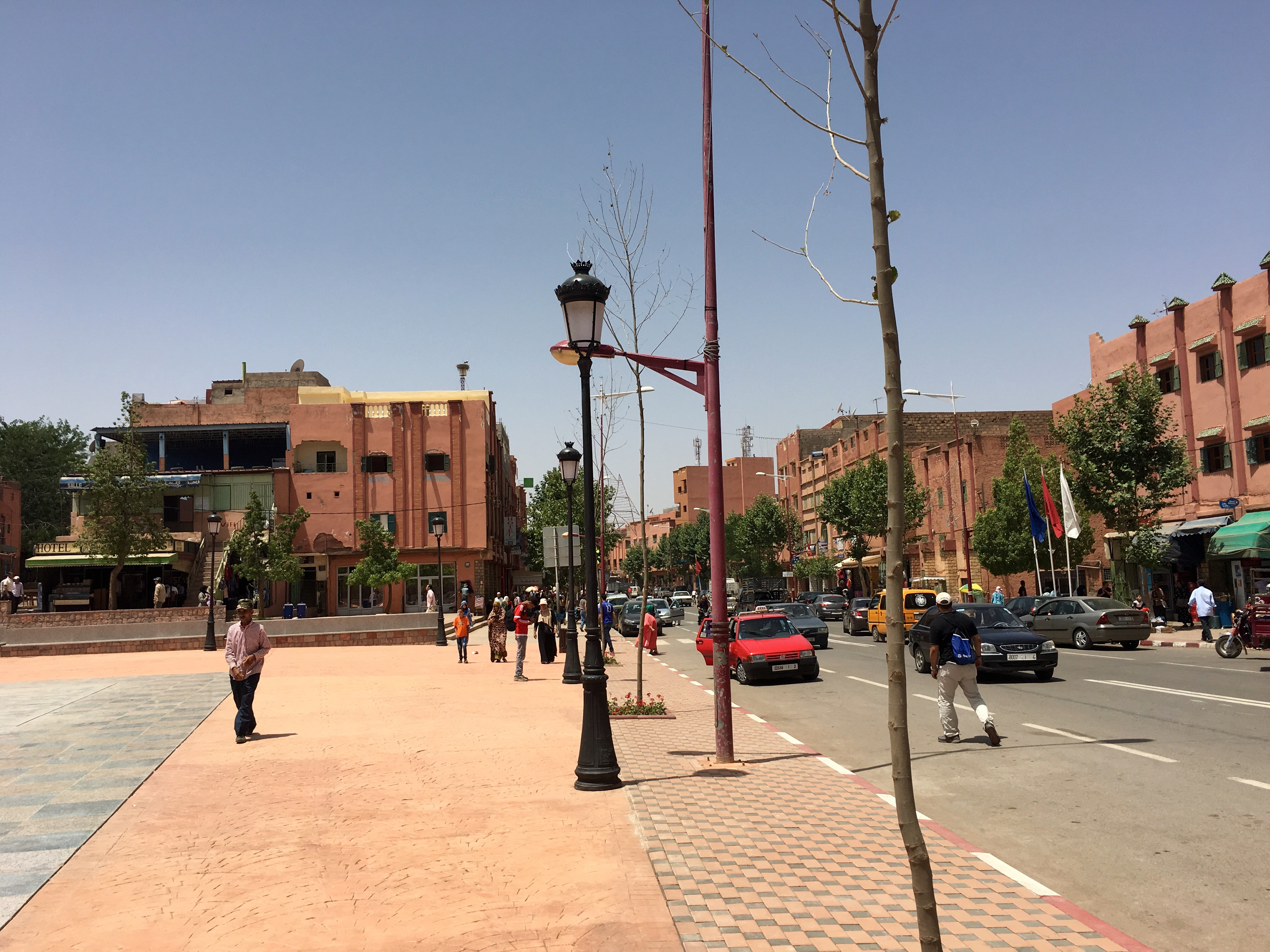
- Interactive map of Azilal
- Coordinates: 31°58′1″N 6°34′10″W
- Country: Morocco
- Region: Béni Mellal-Khénifra
- Province: Azilal Province
- Elevation: 4,518 ft (1,377 m)

Population (2024)
  - Total: 48,138
- Time zone: UTC+0 (GMT)
- Postal code: 22000

Azilal (Standard Moroccan Tamazight: ⴰⵣⵉⵍⴰⵍ, Arabic: أزيلال) is a city that serves as capital of Azilal Province in central Morocco, in the High Atlas. It is also the capital of the M'Goun Conservation Area.

== Etymology ==
Azilal’s name roughly means “ridge” in Tamazight.

== History ==
The deserted Kasbah (Igherm) of Azilal, 2008

Azilal was originally a meeting place for various Amazigh tribes to gather and trade. During the French protectorate in Morocco, the town was occupied by colonial forces and used as an outpost to spread further into the mountains. A colonial quarter remains inhabited to this day by local Amazigh families. The quarter is located on a hill within Azilal's municipal boundary and is separated from the town by a colonial-era wall. But the surrounding areas are more famous for their resistance against colonialism such as Ait Attab, Tabia, Bzou, Tanant, Demnate and others.

== Geography ==
Given the rich geology of the surrounding mountains, Azilal is the capital of the M'Goun Conservation Area and home to the M'Goun Geopark Museum. Azilal has become a jumping-off point for tourists to visit various World Heritage Sites. The Ouzoud Falls, one of the most popular sites in the conservation area, is only 27 km away by road.

South of Azilal, there is a 304.8-meter high mast for longwave broadcasting.

== Demographics ==
Azilal is inhabited by Moroccans of Amazigh descent. Most Amazigh families come from surrounding villages/communes. Azilal residents, therefore, speak Tamazight. Due to modern media exposure, most can also speak Moroccan Arabic.

== Landmarks ==
=== Thursday Souq ===
Every Thursday, residents of Azilal and surrounding villages gather at the southwest end of the city to buy and sell goods in an open-air souq. The souq is divided into sections based upon the goods being sold. A second share taxi stand is also set up just beyond the souq gate to streamline transportation from other towns. Rather than travel to the center of Azilal, passengers can go directly to the souq.

=== Dinosaur statue ===
A dinosaur statue was built in Azilal to commemorate the establishment of the M'Goun Conservation Area. This statue is a popular attraction for both Moroccan and international tourists who stop to take pictures with it. At night, the statue is lit up with multi-colored lights and surrounded by water fountains.

== Culture ==
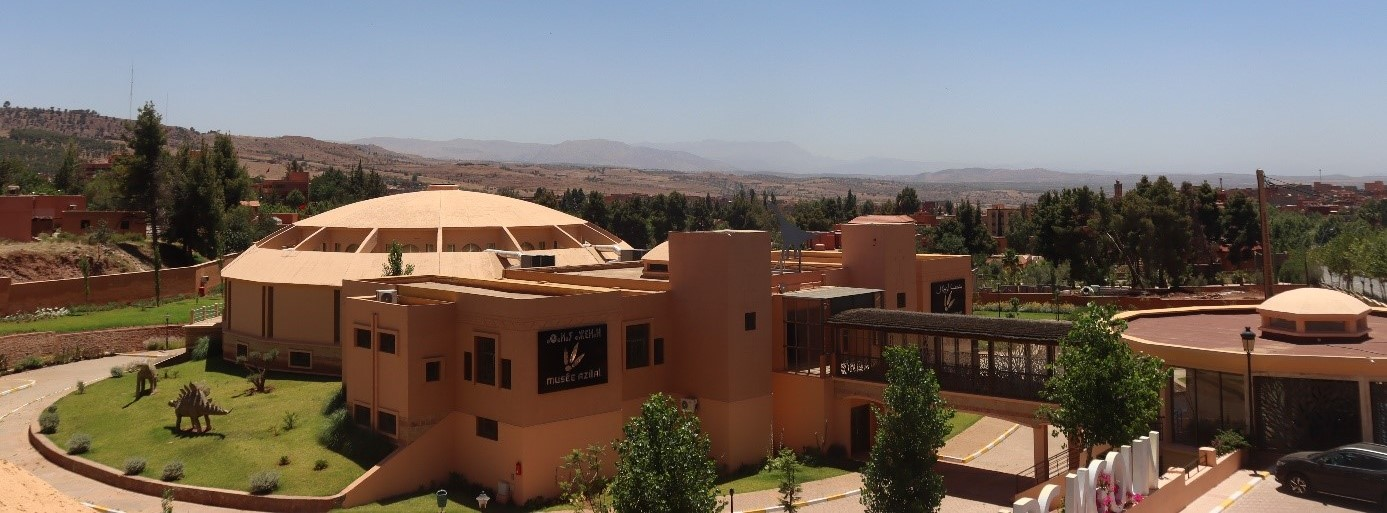
Azilal Museum

Along with Muslim and national holidays, Azilal residents also celebrate the Amazigh New Year according to the Berber calendar. A celebration of the holiday is often held in either a local cultural center or youth center and features reenactments of moments in Amazigh history and the singing of Amazigh pop and folk music. For the Amazigh New Year, many families in Azilal prepare couscous with seven vegetables.

The traditional song and dance, ahidus, is performed at most weddings and cultural events in Azilal. This call and response song has also been recorded by Amazigh pop artists and is occasionally played digitally rather than performed.

Other cultural practices such as saint worship and tribal face tattooing have begun to decline. These practices are now seen as sacrilegious by many Moroccans including those in Azilal. While the practices themselves are disappearing, facial tattoos can still be seen on older Amazigh women and the remains of shrines for saints are still standing in and around Azilal.

== Notable people ==
Soufiane Bouftini, footballer
