= Bni Ayat =

- Rural commune and town
- Location within Morocco
- Coordinates: 32.2155°N 6.5833°W
- Country: Morocco
- Region: Béni Mellal-Khénifra
- Province: Azilal

Population (2004)
  - Total: 20,905
- Time zone: UTC+0 (GMT)
- Postal code: 22652

Bni Ayat is a small town and rural commune in Azilal Province, Béni Mellal-Khénifra, Morocco. At the time of the 2004 census, the commune had a total population of 20,905 people living in 3,477 households.
