= Oued El Abid =

River in Tunisia with a dam

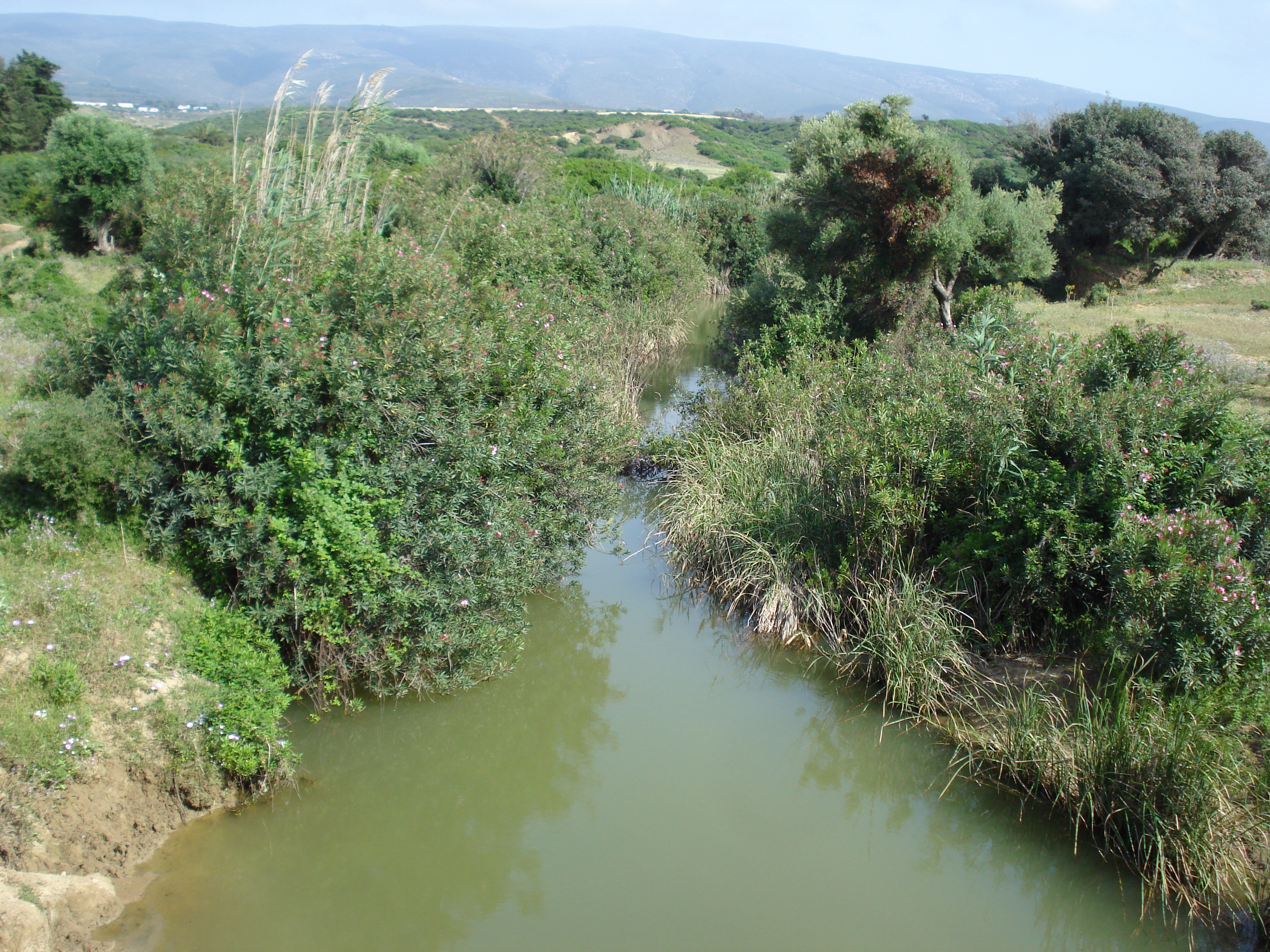
Oued El Abid

Oued El Abid is a wadi in the north-east of Tunisia.

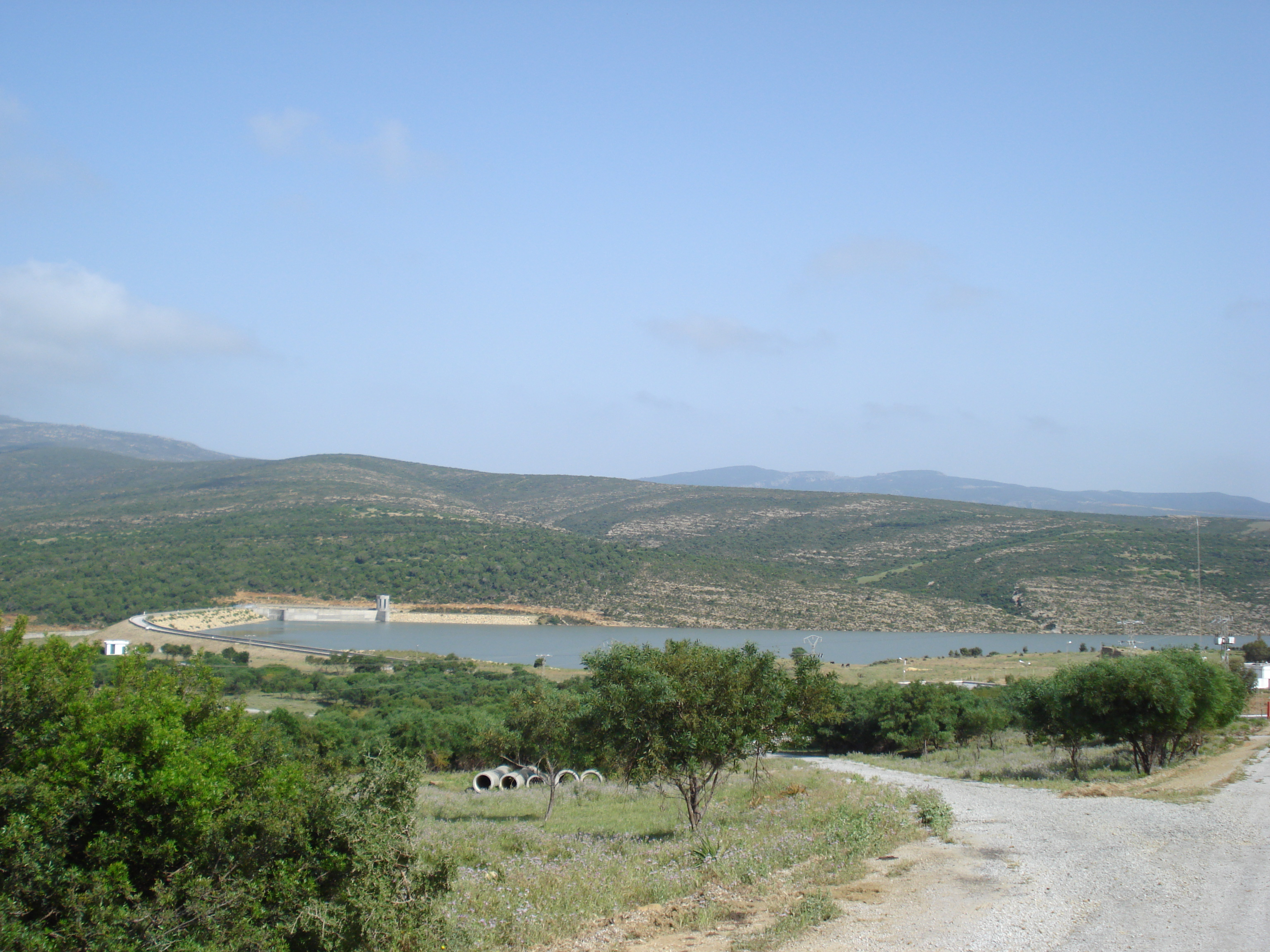
Barrage Oued El Abid

The Barrage Oued El Abid (سد وادي العبيد) is a dam on the river at 36 ° 49 '13 " north, 10°42'11" east that was built in 2002 and holds 10 million m³.

The name of the river means wadi of the Valley of Slaves.
