= Bin el Ouidane Dam =

Dam in Azilal, Morocco

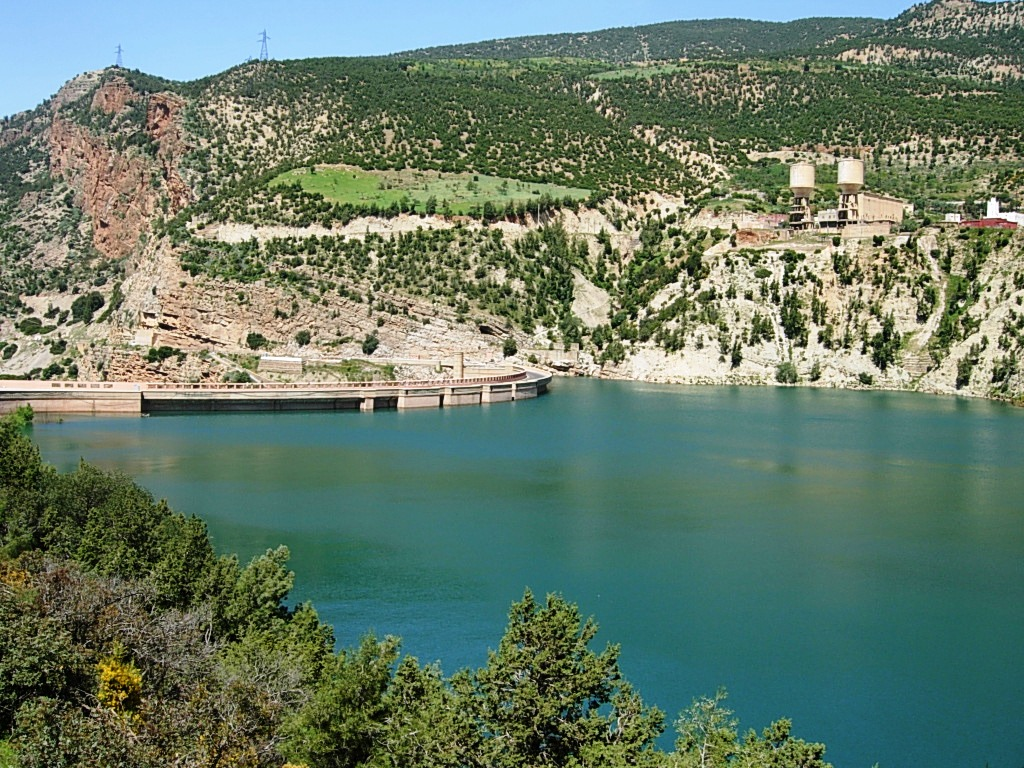
- Upstream face and crest of the dam
- Interactive map of Bin el Ouidane Dam
- Official name: Barrage Bin el Ouidane
- Country: Morocco
- Location: Azilal Province
- Coordinates: 32°06′24″N 06°27′49″W
- Status: Operational
- Construction began: 1949
- Opening date: 1953
- Owner: Office National de L'Electricite (ONE)

Dam and spillways
- Type of dam: Arch
- Impounds: El-Abid River
- Height: 133 m (436 ft)
- Length: 290 m (950 ft)
- Dam volume: 365,000 m^{3} (12,900,000 cu ft)

Reservoir
- Total capacity: 1,500×10^{6} m^{3} (1,200,000 acre⋅ft)
- Catchment area: 6,400 km^{2} (2,500 sq mi)

Power Station
- Commission date: 1953
- Turbines: 3 x 45 MW (60,000 hp)
- Installed capacity: 135 MW (181,000 hp)
- Annual generation: 287 GWh (1,030 TJ)

The Bin el Ouidane Dam is an arch dam located 28 kilometres (17 mi) south of Beni Mellal on the El-Abid River in Azilal Province, Morocco. Designed by Coyne et Bellier and constructed between 1949 and 1953, the purpose of the dam is hydroelectric power production and irrigation. Its 135 MW (181,000 hp) power station produces an average of 287 gigawatt-hours (1,030 TJ) annually and water from the reservoir helps irrigate 69,500 hectares (172,000 acres) in the Beni Moussa and Tadla plains.

== See also ==
- List of power stations in Morocco
