= Ait Taguella =

Coordinates: 31°56′N 6°45′W

- Rural commune and town
- Interactive map of Ait Taguella
- Country: Morocco
- Region: Béni Mellal-Khénifra
- Province: Azilal Province

Population (2004)
  - Total: 7,340
- Time zone: UTC+0 (GMT)

Ait Taguella is a small town and rural commune in Azilal Province of the Béni Mellal-Khénifra region of Morocco. At the time of the 2004 census, the commune had a total population of 7,340 people living in 1,236 households.
