= Demnate =

Demnate دمنات ⴷⵎⵏⴰⵜ
- City
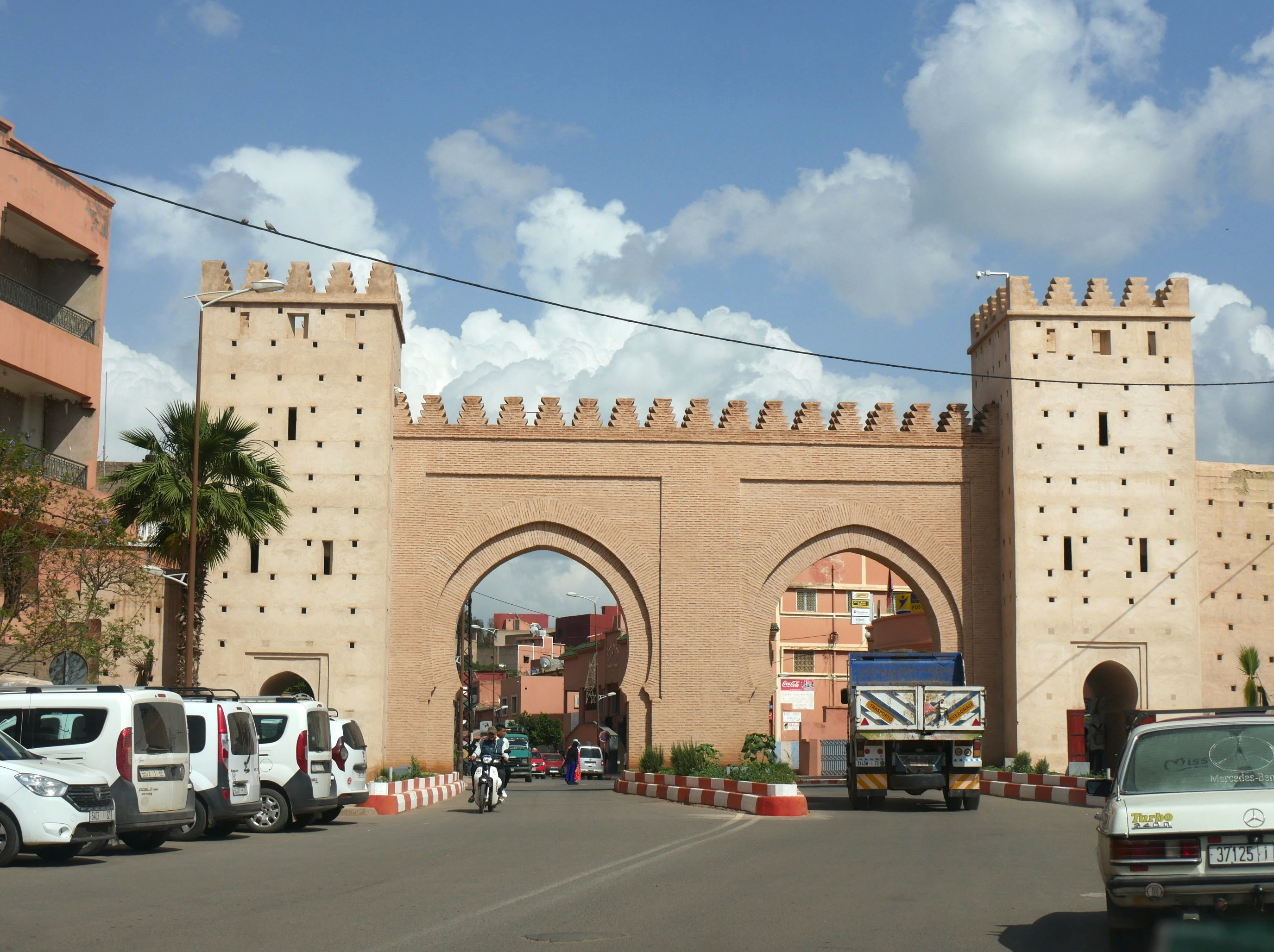
- Interactive map of Demnate
- Coordinates: 31°43′52″N 7°0′10″W
- Country: Morocco
- Region: Béni Mellal-Khénifra
- Province: Azilal
- Elevation: 968 m (3,176 ft)

Population (2024)
  - Total: 33,635

Demnate (Arabic: دمنات; Standard Moroccan Tamazight: Dmnat, ⴷⵎⵏⴰⵜ) is a city in central Morocco, located at the foot of the High Atlas roughly 110 km east of Marrakesh.

The city is surrounded by mountains and natural attractions, including the natural land bridge Imi-n-Ifri Formation containing dinosaur traces, and the Ouzoud Falls.

== Economy ==
Demnate has many weavers and contains large deposits of red clay which local artisans make into pottery. Demnate has recognized local authority which includes an active police station. The Qayd has an office at the north end of town. Electricity is available 24 hours a day, running water. There is a bus station with daily routes to most major cities.

== Public services ==
Demnate has three hospitals and a diabetes center. One public hospital, one children's hospital and a TB prevention and treatment center. Although the hospitals are free, herbal and home remedies are common and hospital visits are for more extreme or chronic diseases. Tap water is treated and completely safe to drink. People are aware of E. coli and that all meat must be cooked thoroughly.

Demnate has three major facilities that work with local youth: the Youth Center, the Environmental Center, and the Women's Center. The Youth Center has an active theater group and computer classes, along with soccer

== History ==
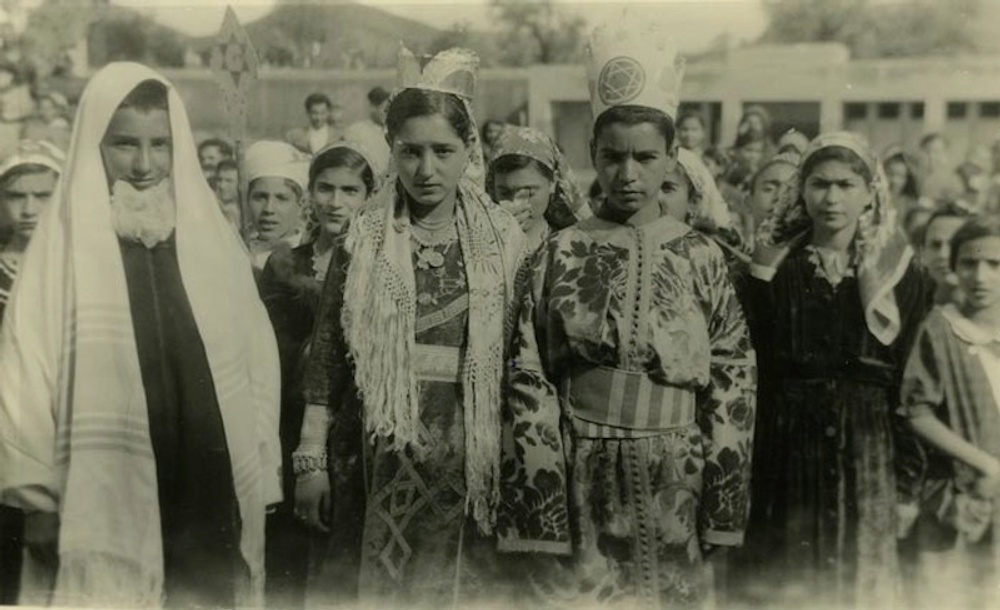
Jews of Demnate c. 1955

The city was also home to a significant Jewish community, who settled there in the early 12th century and lasted until late 1950s. They were known in the region for their winemaking along with being craftsmen and artisans specializing in leather goods.
