= Imi-n-Ifri Formation =

- Stratigraphic range: Sinemurian
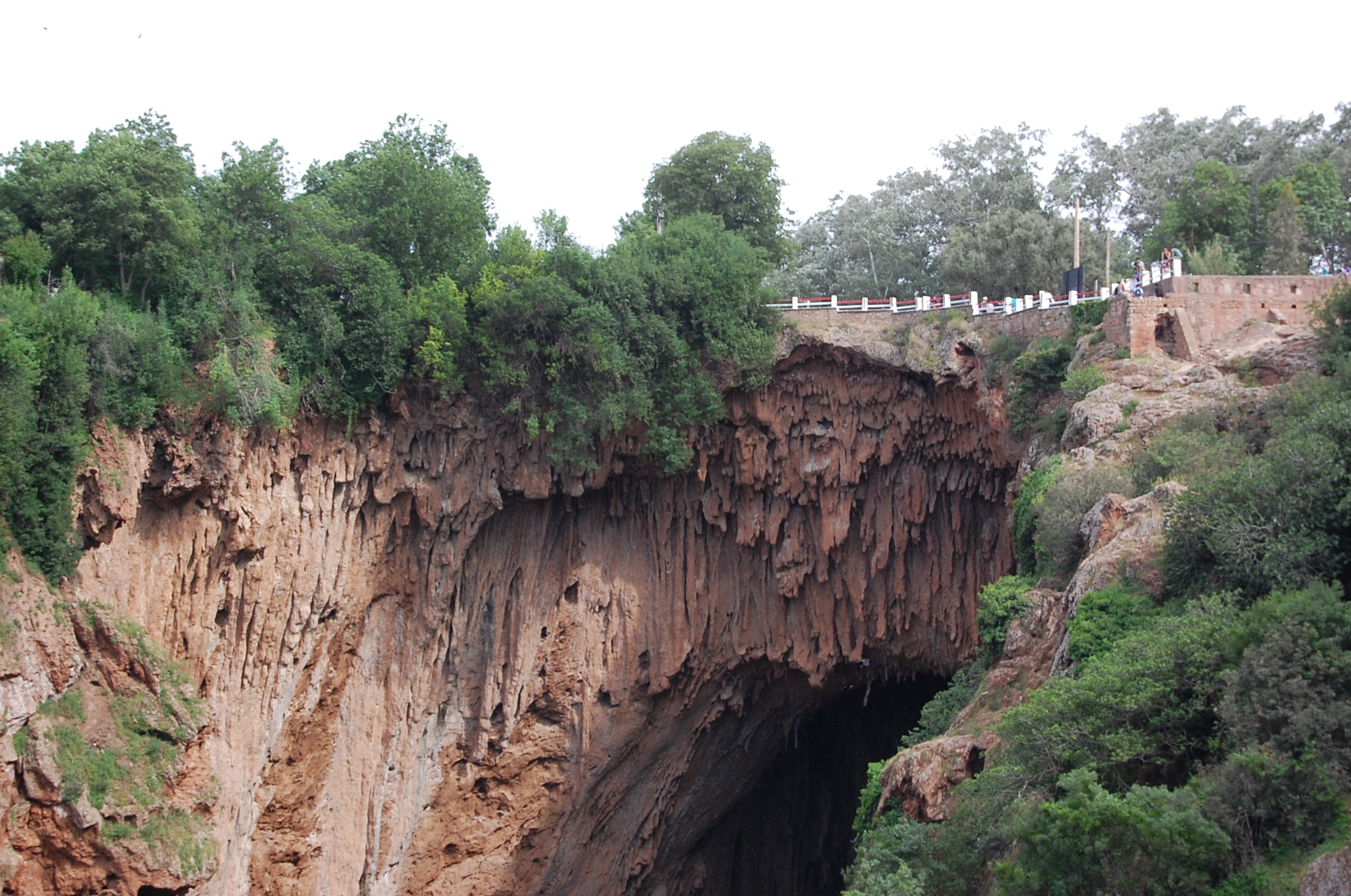
- Type: Geological formation
- Underlies: Aganane Formation

Lithology
- Primary: Limestone, dolomite

Location
- Coordinates: 31.3°N 7.1°W
- Approximate paleocoordinates: 24.6°N 6.8°W
- Region: Africa
- Country: Morocco
- Extent: Ouarzazate Province
- Imi-n-Ifri Formation (Morocco)

The Imi-n-Ifri Formation is a Sinemurian geologic formation outcropping about 6 kilometres (3.7 mi) from Demnate, to the east of Marrakesh, Morocco. Fossil ornithopod tracks have been reported from the formation.

== Description ==
The formation comprises limestones and dolomites deposited in shallow depth of water, low-energy, marine or lagoonal to supratidal environments. The footprints appear on the surface of a vast limestone on a surface of between 8 and 9,000 square metres (86 and 96,875 sq ft). The top of the carbonate sequence is marked by a bench of yellow 'cargneule' capped by a hardground.

== See also ==
- List of dinosaur-bearing rock formations
  - List of stratigraphic units with ornithischian tracks
    - Ornithopod tracks
