= Ouzoud Falls =

Waterfalls in Morocco

- Ouzoud Waterfalls
- Interactive map of Ouzoud Falls
- Location: Ait Taguella, Azilal Province, Morocco
- Coordinates: 32.0152°N 6.7189°W
- Type: Multi-step
- Total height: 110 m (360 ft)
- Number of drops: 3
- Longest drop: 75

Ouzoud Falls (Amazigh: ⵉⵎⵓⵣⵣⴰⵔ ⵏ ⵡⵓⵥⵓⴷ Imuzzar n wuẓuḍ, French: Cascades d'Ouzoud) is the collective name for several waterfalls in Azilal Province, Morocco. The waterfalls empty into the El-Abid River's (Arabic for "Slaves' River") gorge. A popular tourism destination, they are located 36 kilometres (22 mi) from the town of Azilal and 150 kilometres (93 mi) from Marrakesh. 'Ouzoud' means "the act of grinding grain" in Berber.
