= Azilal Province =

Province of Morocco

Coordinates: 31°58′N 6°34′W

Azilal Province إقليم أزيلال ⵜⴰⵙⴳⴰ ⵏ ⵓⵣⵉⵍⴰⵍ
- Province
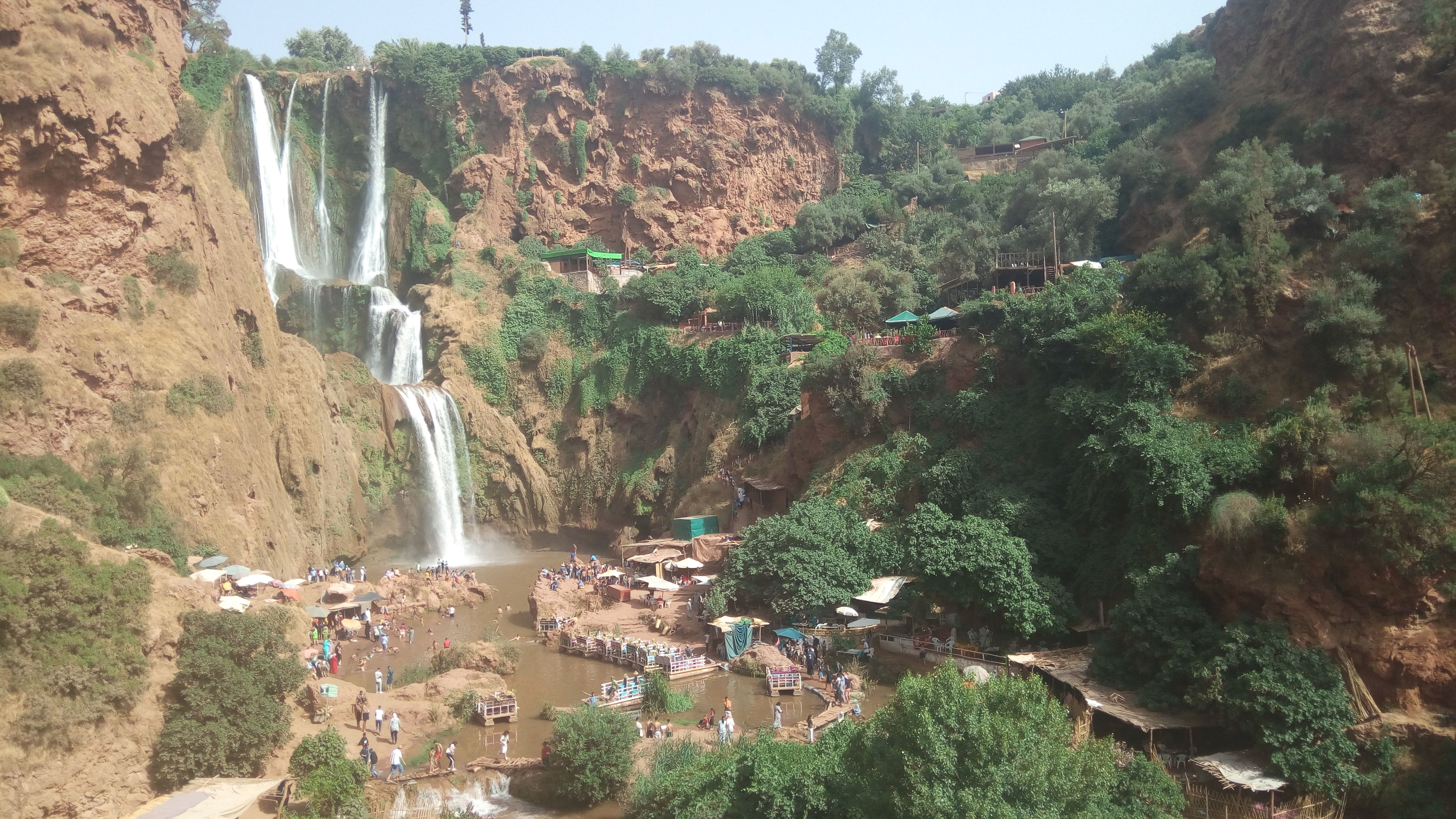
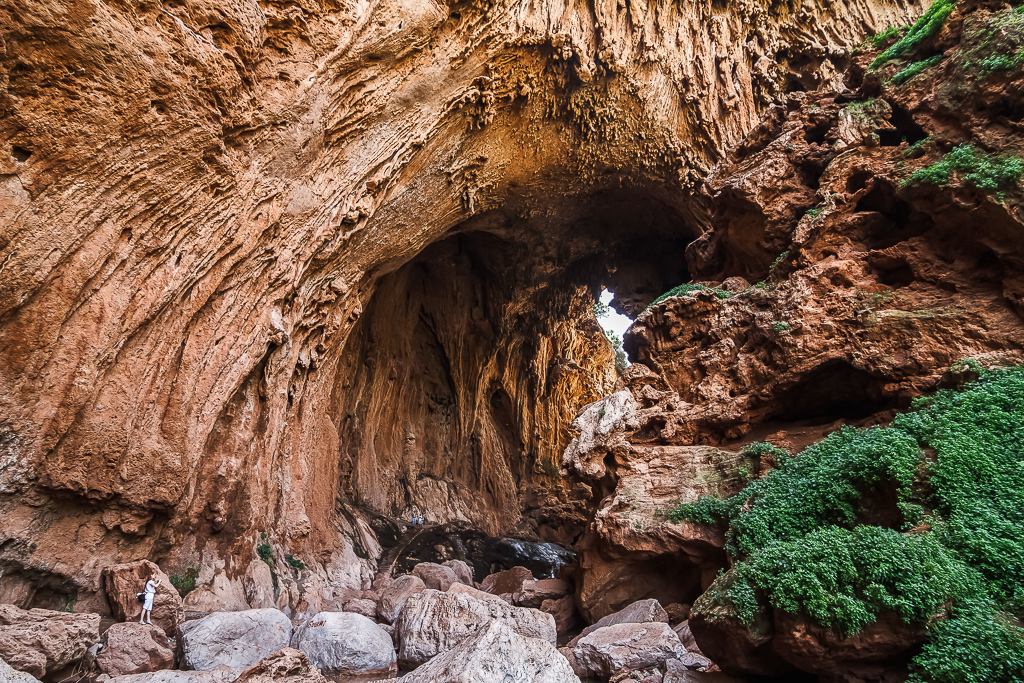
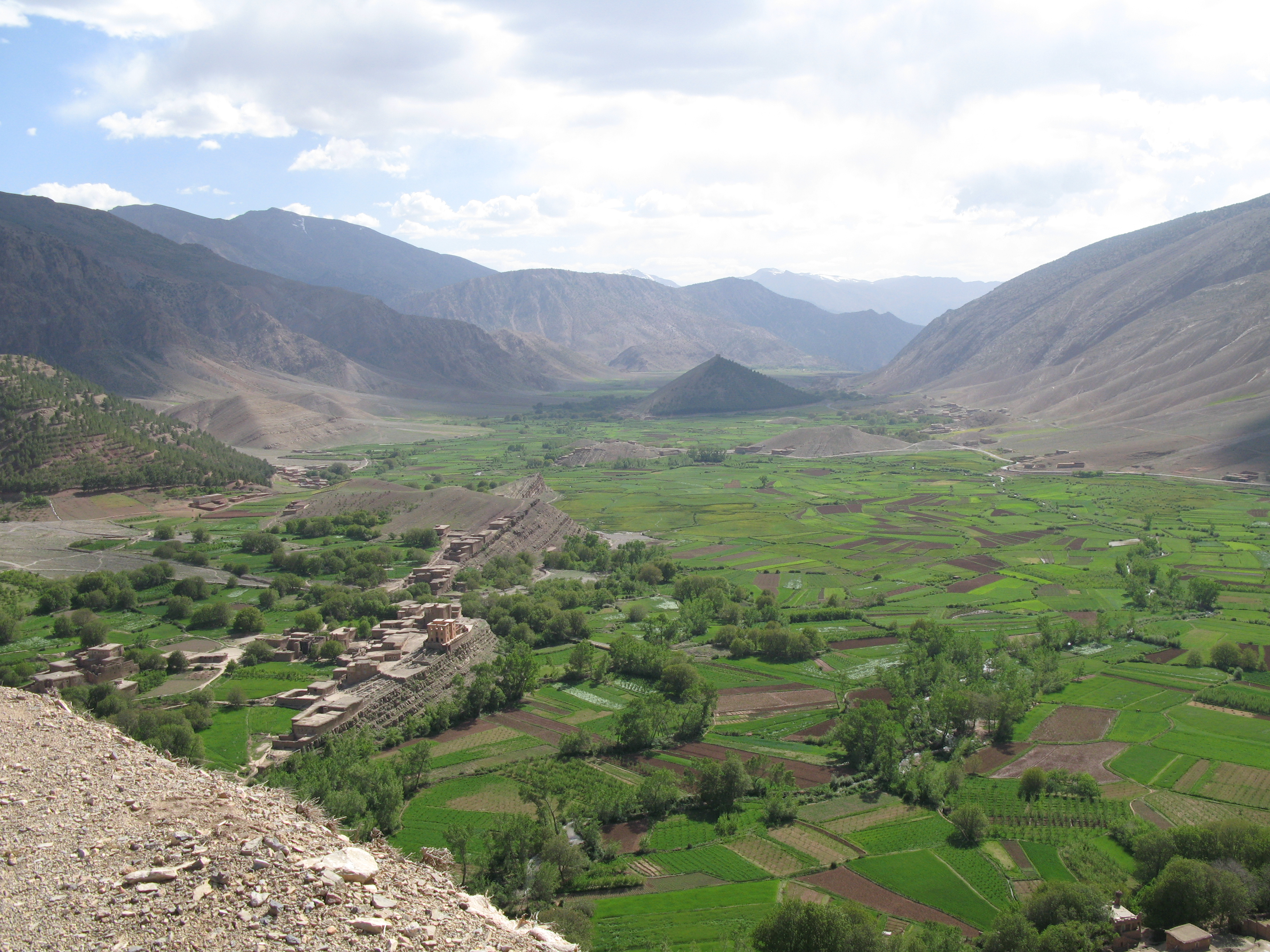
- Bin el Ouidane Dam Ouzoud Falls The Imi-n-Ifri Formation, Demnate Ait Bouguemez, also known as the 'Happy valley', Tabant Imsfrane, also known as the 'Cathedral' monolith, Tilougguite
- Interactive map of Azilal Province
- Country: Morocco
- Region: Béni Mellal-Khénifra
- Seat: Azilal

Population (2024)
  - Total: 574,112

Azilal (Arabic: أزيلال; Standard Moroccan Tamazight: ⴰⵣⵉⵍⴰⵍ) is a predominantly rural province in the Moroccan region of Béni Mellal-Khénifra. Its population in 2024 is 574,112. The provincial capital and namesake is the city of Azilal.

The major cities and towns are:

- Afourar
- Azilal
- Demnate
- Ouaouizeght

== Subdivisions ==
Communes of Azilal Province

The province is divided administratively into the following:

=== Municipalities ===
Name	Geographic code	Households (2024)	Population (2024)
Azilal	081.01.01.	11375	48138
Demnate	081.01.03.	7903	33635

=== Rural communes ===
Name	Geographic code	Households (2024)	Population (2024)	Notes
Afourar	081.11.01.	5050	20215	Urban centre: Afourar (12,981 inhabitants; 3,381 households)
Agoudi N'Lkhair	081.03.01.	2228	11964	
Ait Abbas	081.03.03.	2235	13548	
Ait Blal	081.15.01.	1334	7840	
Ait Bou Oulli	081.03.05.	1866	11992	
Ait Majden	081.15.03.	3851	18538	
Ait Mazigh	081.09.03.	613	2765	
Ait M'Hamed	081.03.07.	4183	23531	
Ait Ouaarda	081.11.05.	279	1459	
Ait Oumdis	081.13.05.	2449	13908	
Ait Ouqabli	081.09.07.	875	3405	
Ait Taguella	081.05.01.	1956	8662	
Ait Tamlil	081.13.07.	3246	18091	
Anergui	081.09.09.	911	3976	
Anzou	081.13.09.	3262	16554	
Bin El Ouidane	081.09.11.	1098	4605	
Bni Ayat	081.11.03.	5318	23675	
Bni Hassane	081.05.05.	2687	12390	
Bzou	081.05.07.	3563	13602	Urban centre: Bzou (4,014 inhabitants; 1,144 households)
Foum Jemaa	081.05.09.	2310	9373	Urban centre: Foum Jemaa (5,804 inhabitants; 1,470 households)
Imlil	081.15.11.	2608	11175	
Isseksi	081.09.13.	369	1464	
Moulay Aissa Ben Driss	081.05.11.	3099	13409	
Ouaouizeght	081.09.15.	3487	13402	Urban centre: Ouaouizeght (8,639 inhabitants; 2,310 households)
Ouaoula	081.15.13.	4758	26410	
Rfala	081.05.13.	2187	9352	
Sidi Boulkhalf	081.15.15.	3028	16229	
Sidi Yacoub	081.13.17.	3549	18868	
Tabant	081.03.09.	2910	16401	
Tabaroucht	081.09.17.	803	3877	
Tabia	081.05.15.	1639	7354	
Tagleft	081.09.19.	3844	16412	
Tamda Noumercid	081.03.11.	2454	12959	
Tanant	081.05.17.	2466	10891	
Taounza	081.05.19.	2407	10254	
Tidili Fetouaka	081.13.19.	2835	13661	
Tiffert N'Ait Hamza	081.09.21.	879	3784	
Tifni	081.15.21.	2299	10906	
Tilougguite	081.09.23.	2455	11592	
Timoulilt	081.11.25.	1732	6852	
Tisqi	081.05.21.	1283	5734	
Zaouiat Ahansal	081.03.13.	2159	11260	
