= Tadla-Azilal =

Tadla-Azilal تادلة أزيلال
- Region
- Location in Morocco
- Coordinates: 32°20′N 6°21′W
- Country: Morocco
- Capital: Beni Mellal

Area
  - Total: 17,125 km^{2} (6,612 sq mi)

Population (2014 census)
  - Total: 1,607,506
- Time zone: UTC+0 (WET)
  - Summer (DST): UTC+1 (WEST)

Tadla-Azilal (Arabic: تادلة أزيلال) was formerly one of the sixteen regions of Morocco from 1997 to 2015. It was situated in central Morocco. It covered an area of 17,125 km^{2} and had a population of 1,607,509 (2014 census). The capital was Beni Mellal. In 2015, the region annexed Khénifra Province (from Meknès-Tafilalet Region) and Khouribga Province (from Chaouia-Ouardigha Region) to form the Region of Béni Mellal-Khénifra.

The former region was made up of the following provinces :

- Azilal Province
- Béni-Mellal Province
- Fquih Ben Salah Province (since 2012)
