= Zawyat Ahançal Group =

Geological formations in Morocco

- Stratigraphic range: Toarcian-Aalenian 184–171 Ma Polymorphum-Bradfordensis
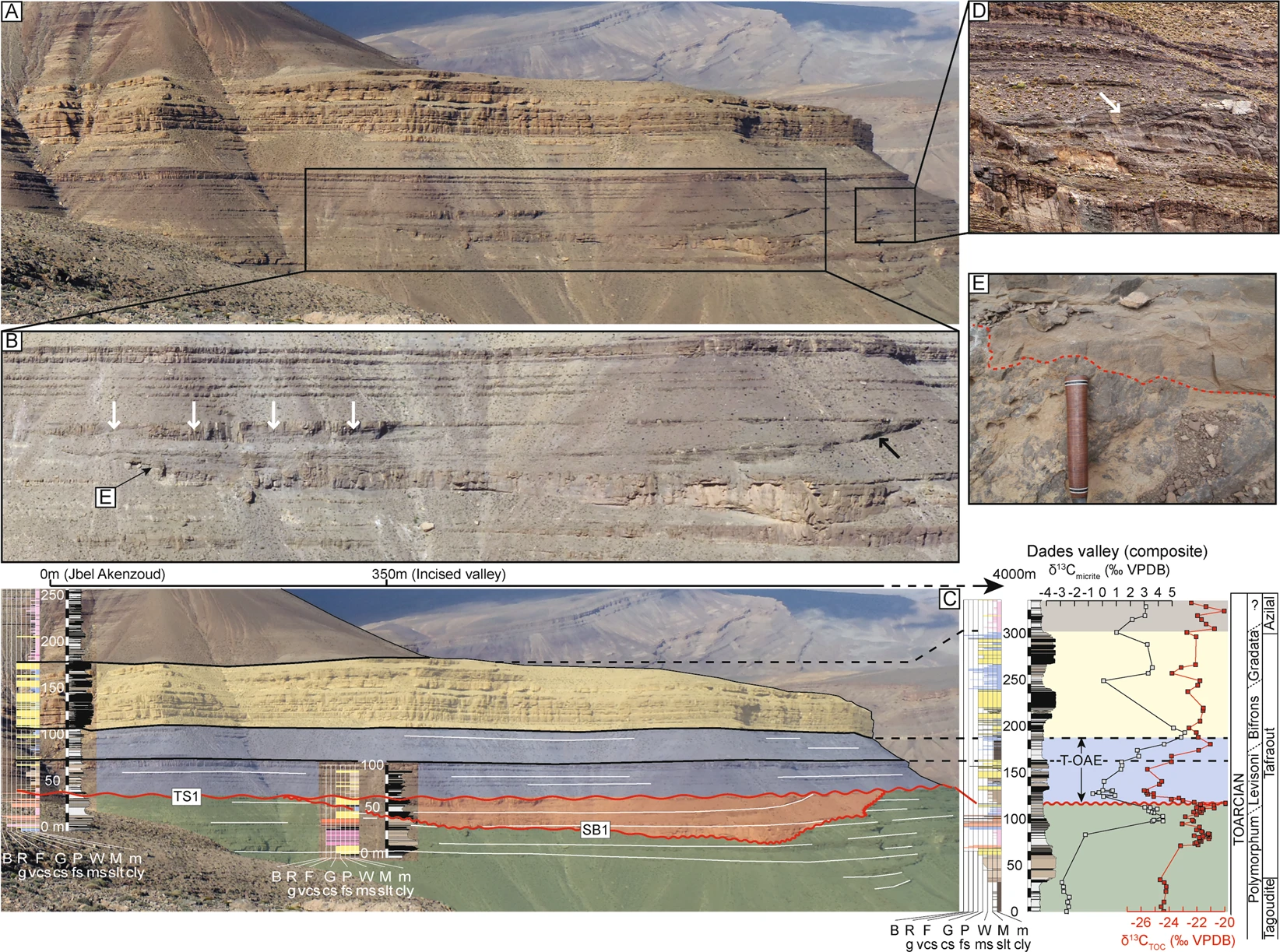
- Profile at Jebel Akenzoud (Dadès Gorges) where the Tagoudite, Tafraout and Azilal Fms can be seen. (B) Close-up view of the left side ooidal shoal with lateral accretions (white arrows). (C) Stratigraphic correlation. (D) Close up of the right side shoulder. (E) Close up on the erosion surface.
- Type: Geological Group
- Sub-units: Azilal Formation; Tafraout Formation I-IV
- Underlies: Aït Abdi Formation; Aït Hani formation; Agoudim Formation; Amellago Formation; Azrif Formation; Bin el Ouidane Formation; Guettioua Formation; Tanat Formation I-III
- Overlies: Aberdouz Formation; Aganane Formation; Aït-Bazzi Formation; Choucht Formation; Imi-n-Ifri Formation; Ouchbis Formation; Tagoudite Formation
- Thickness: 3,000 m (9,800 ft)

Lithology
- Primary: Clay, conglomerate (Azilal); Oolitic Grainstone, Clays, Limestone (Tafraout)

Location
- Location: Assif Tafraout
- Coordinates: 31.49°N 5.58°W
- Approximate paleocoordinates: 26.6°N 3.4°W
- Region: High Atlas and Middle Atlas
- Country: Morocco

Type section
- Named for: Zaouiat Ahansal village
- Named by: Abdellah Milhi
- Location: Right side valley of Assif Tafraout. The village of Tafraout lies about 1 km to the north
- Year defined: 1992
- Region: Taghia, Southern Béni Mellal-Khénifra
- Thickness at type section: ~2,200 m (7,200 ft)
- Zawyat Ahançal Group (Morocco)

The Zawyat Ahançal Group (Also known as "Zaouiat Ahançal Group" & "Taffraout Group") is a geological group of Toarcian-Aalenian (Lower Jurassic-Middle Jurassic) age in the Azilal, Béni-Mellal, Imilchil, Zaouiat Ahansal, Ouarzazate, Tinerhir, Tinejdad and Errachidia areas of the High Atlas of Morocco. The Group represents the remnants of a local massive Siliciclastic-Carbonate platform ("Tafraout Platform"), best assigned to succession W-E of fluvial to tidal flat to inner platform to open marine settings, recording a dramatic decrease of the carbonate productivity under increasing terrigenous sedimentation, as well the Toarcian Oceanic Anoxic Event. Fossils include large reef biotas with richness in Plicatostylidae bivalves and coral mounts ("Patch reef", Tafraout Formation), but also by remains of vertebrates such as the sauropod Tazoudasaurus and the basal ceratosaur Berberosaurus, along with several undescribed genera. While there have been attributions of its lowermost layers to the Latest Pliensbachian, the current oldest properly measured are part of the Earliest Toarcian regression ("MRST10").

This group is composed of the following units W-E: the Azilal Formation (continental to subtidal, including its synonyms the "Wazzant Formation", "Continental Series of Toundoute" as well the "Aguerd-nˈTazoult Formation"); the Tafraout I-IV Formations (deposited in a subtidal to inner platform environment, includes the "Amezraï Fm"). They are connected with the offshore Tagoudite Formation, Ait Athmane Formation and the deeper shelf deposits of the Agoudim Formation.

== Description ==
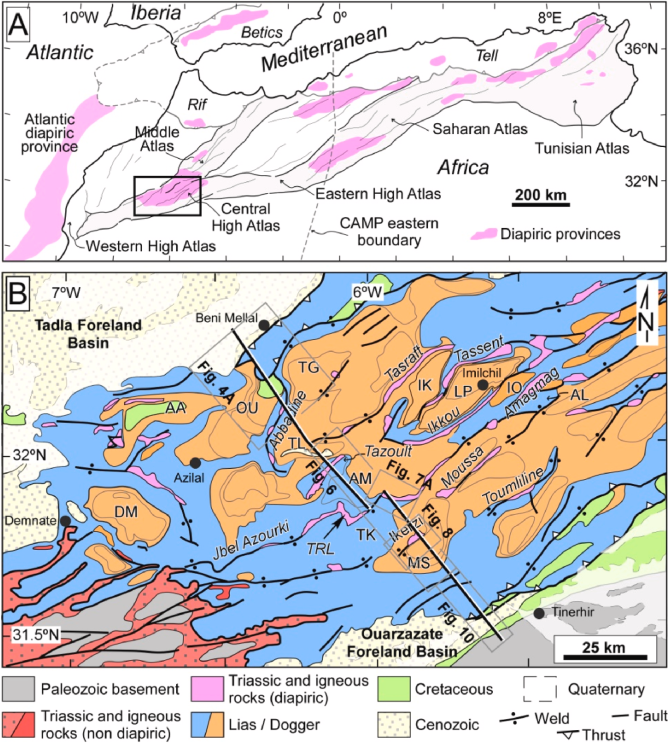
Location of the High Atlas basin and Geological overview of the main sectors

The group is allocated within of the mountain belt that is the Central High Atlas, formed by the inversion of a rift from the Triassic-Jurassic periods, due to Cenozoic tectonic activity. Overall region's structure comes from four main tectonic phases: the pre-rift phase tied to the formation of Pangaea, the syn-rift phase during the Late Permian to Late Triassic, influenced by the opening of the Atlantic Ocean and Tethys Ocean, and the post-rift phase, where Jurassic-Cretaceous carbonate platforms formed. Several tectonic events during the Triassic-Jurassic boundary reactivated normal faults, leading to the dominance of marls during the Middle Liassic to Toarcian.

=== Azilal Formation ===
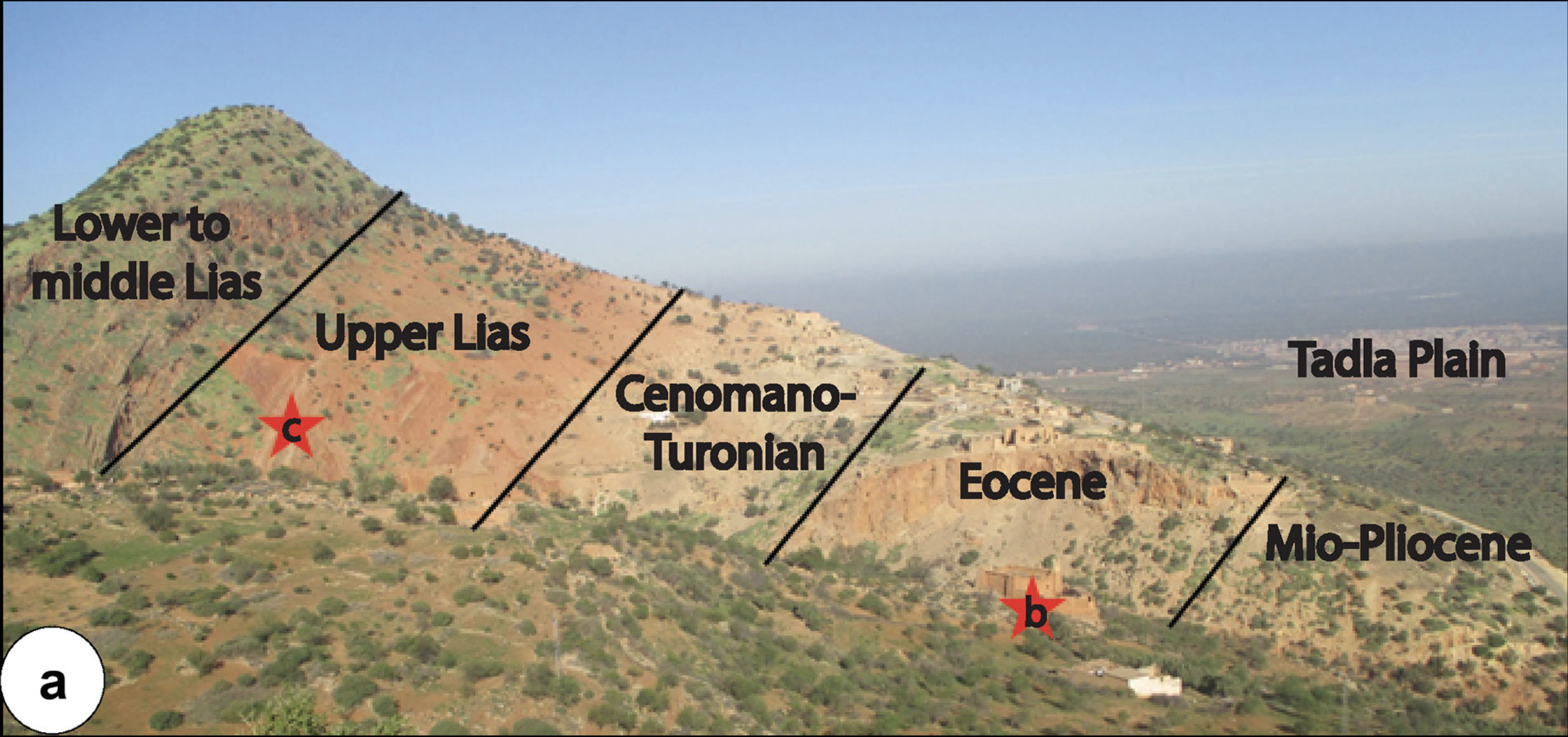
Overlap of the Jurassic on the Cretaceous at the Aït Attab syncline, with the Azilal Formation as "Upper Lias"

Informally known as "Marnes chocolat" in the Azilal region, and represents a continental to marginal marine unit made up of red brown marls, silts (microsandstones) and conglomerates with centimetric quartz dragees. More marine-influenced sections near Beni Mellal are composed by a succession of reddish-brown tints with terrigenous dominance: sandstone, clays with paleosols and sandstone limestones sometimes dolomitized, with marmorized levels in paleosols towards the N. Here, it evolves from lower sections with transition from sandstone to limestone and/or sandstone to clay, with a thin level of green marls locally rich in ostracods. Then is followed by subtidal term, represented by an oolitic limestone with fine lamellibranch bioclasts and variable percentages of quartz and sandstone with calcareous cement and rare oolites drawing on the surface mega-ripples of 3 to 5 m in wavelength. It ends with supratidal deposits made of coarse sandstone gradually changing to red Marls with "fluer" structures and locally to paleosols with fluvial decametric channeling lenses.

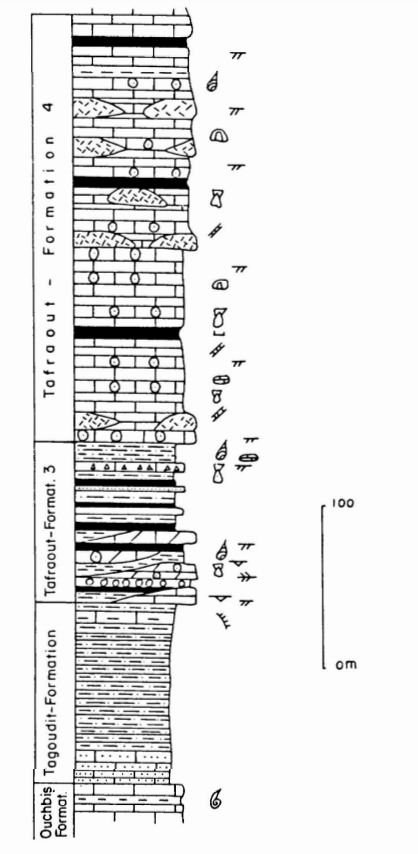
Profile at Ouguerd Zegzaoune with the Tagoudite and Tafraout Fms and it's associated biota

On the south-southwest edge of the basin towards west of Azilal (Jbel Til-Jbel Amersiaz basin and part of the M'Goun syncline), Demnate, Telouet, Toundoute and Marrakesh, under the Bajocian limestones or directly under the Bajocian?-Bathonian Guettioua Formation, develops a thick a red detrital section in which pelites, sandstones and conglomerates with centimeter-sized quartz balls alternate and breccias (locally called " Wazzant Formation") with non dissolved Liassic limestone elements. This sector reaches 800 m thickness in the Wazzant subasin, being very reduced to the south of it in Aït-Toutline or Aït-Iouaridène, recovering a variation of the sedimentary process formed by a complex sedimentary unit, terrigenously dominated, composed by the abundance of conglomeratic channels with quartz dragees and Paleozoic basement elements, sandstones organized in bars channeled lenticulars and red clays, the whole part of the facies is organized in metric sequences of filling and alluvial channels.

In Talmest-Tazoult (Zaouiat Ahansal), the "Aguerd-nˈTazoult Formation" is present, a local informal unit and the front of the upper Azilal Fm. Is a 50–90 m thick carbonate-dominated unit with minor siliciclastics. Micritic limestones, cm- to metric-thick, feature bird's eyes and algal laminations, forming in low-energy settings. Oolitic grainstones and packstones, cross-stratified with alpha-type ooids, dominate basal and upper parts, indicating high-energy shoals. Oncolitic and stromatolitic marly limestones, well-stratified with lenticular bioherms, occur medially. Massive bioclastic limestones with crinoid-polyp reefs and condensation zones are common. Green, indurated azoic marls and gritty sandstones form cm-m thick intercalations. Abrupt facies transitions reflect halokinetic subsidence in a rift basin. It was deposited in a shallow marine peritidal-supratidal platform.

In the Dadés area the formation is present asynchronously, seen in the W in the Earliest Toarcian, yet in some areas like Boumardoul n'Imazighn doesn't reach until the Middle Toarcian onwards, here recovered under the "Tidrite section", made of fine terrigenous deposits interbedded with dolomitized limestone. In the Ait Hani area at Tinejdad the "Aït Hani formation" has been suggested to be the upper part of the Azilal formation, but is part of the Bajocian units instead.

=== Tafraout Formation ===
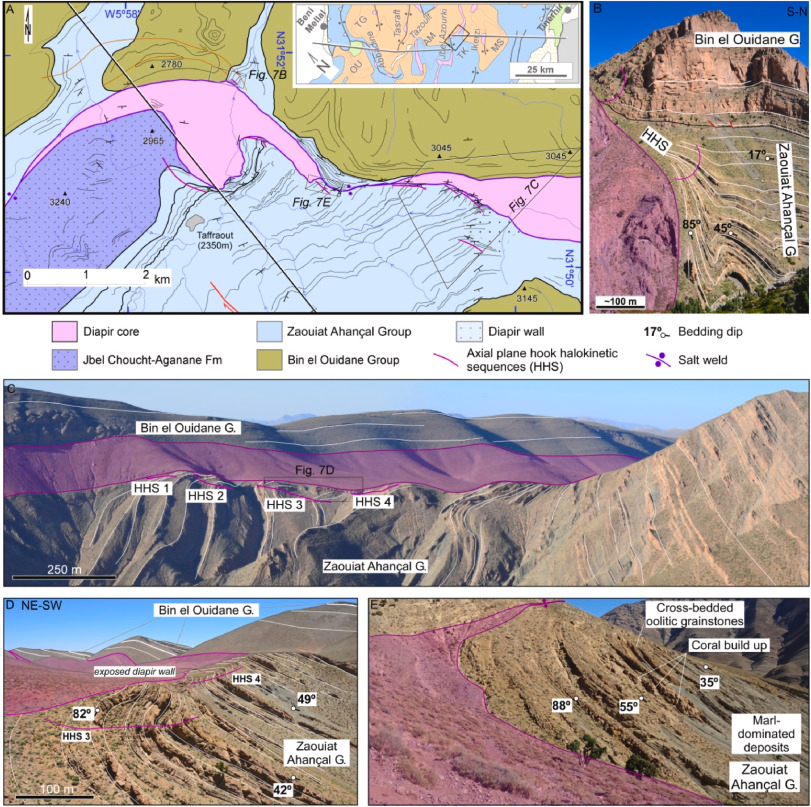
Geology and panoramics of the type area of the Zawyat Ahançal Group. Note the fast transition from shallow coral-rich facies to deeper ones in the diapir's laterals

The Tafraout Formation can be divided in 4 members and is a 30–1000 m thick carbonate-siliciclastic unit, deposited in a Tethyan rift basin (The Central High Atlas Diapiric Province) with halokinetic influences. Consists of oolitic and bioclastic limestones, wackestones, silt marls, and quartz-rich sandstones with minor feldspar and carbonate debris with cross-stratifications, found in channels and bars, alongside greenish marls and micro-conglomerates. It overlies basal discontinuities and is capped by an emersion surface with desiccation cracks and ferruginized crusts.

The oldest segment, previously known as the "Amezraï Formation" is predominantly terrigenous and marked by quartz-rich sandstones, azoic green to yellow marls, and oolitic limestones ranging from oo-intramicrites to oosparites, and cross-bedded sandstones with herringbone structures, asymmetrical ripples, lignite debris, forming high-energy deltaic channels and tidal bars. Nodular limestone bars, locally up to six meters thick, display compaction breccias and hardgrounds, while green marly sandstones highlight lagoonal retention. Synsedimentary faulting, combined with halokinetic subsidence, induced rapid facies changes and erosional breaks, with clastic input derived from uplifted Paleozoic substrates. Condensation horizons contain brachiopods, bivalves, and gastropods, but bioherms are absent.

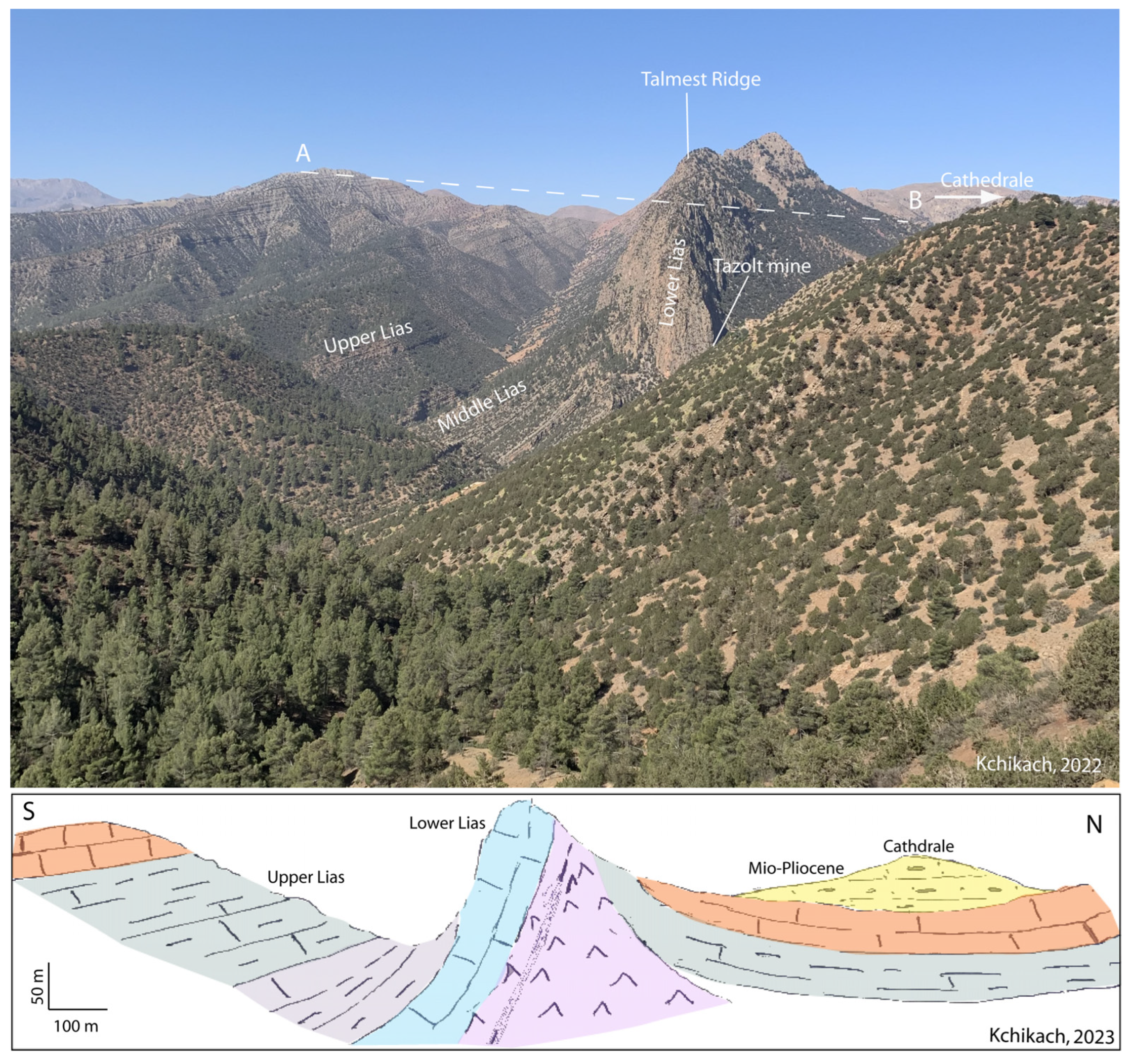
Talmest-Tazoult Rigde N of Zaouiat Ahansal, with exposed facies of the Zawyat Ahançal Group as "Upper Lias"

The succeeding interval, marked by lack of large-scale slumping, shows stratigraphic shift into green marl-dominated sequences, intercalated with nodular, stylolitic limestones ranging from biomicrocrites to recrystallized packstones, red sandstones, slumped channel fills, and bioclastic grainstones with oncolites from lagoonal to tidal flat settings with turbidite deposits, sometimes large coral colonies form early patch reefs. Marls contain fine lamination, terrigenous detritus, and distal turbidite layers, sometimes punctuated by thin lensing sandstones and microconglomerates. Above, the succession returns to more proximal facies, with quartz-rich sandstones, silt-marls, green marly and cross-bedded sandstones, oolitic/bioclastic limestones, including brachiopod-rich packstone bars and condensation zones with bivalves and gastropods, signifying ooid shoals and carbonate units ranging from biodetrital packstones to oolitic grainstones. Microfacies include tangential ooids, intraclasts, peloids, and micritized carbonate fragments. Cross-bedded sandstones and ripple-marked surfaces with drying cracks and plant debris record emersion and supratidal influence. Microconglomerates incorporating metamorphic and magmatic clasts document tectonic supply from the basin margins, while high subsidence rates controlled turbidite influx and rapid lateral facies shifts. Thick carbonate bars and lumachelle horizons represent reworked shoal and bar-top settings within a tectonically active shallow platform.

The youngest member, by far the thickest, is fully carbonate-dominated, with marly micrites, oosparites, bioclastic limestones, and well-developed coral patch reefs attaining 10–40 meters in height. These reefal bodies, composed of framestones and boundstones, occur in stacked horizons and are often flanked by lamellibranch accumulations and coral–bivalve eventstones. Ooid limestones exhibit cross-bedding near reef margins, while emersion horizons with desiccation cracks mark episodic exposure, reflecting subtidal carbonate platforms and lagoons. Stromatactis-like cavities and extensive bioturbation are widespread, reflecting synsedimentary cementation and rapid subsidence associated with halokinetic tectonics. Microconglomerates with older clasts add further evidence of syndepositional tectonism.

Overall, this unit evolves from deltaic sand-dominated deposits to deeper marls, followed by shoal-associated grainstones and culminating in carbonate platforms with coral patch reefs.

== Paleogeography ==
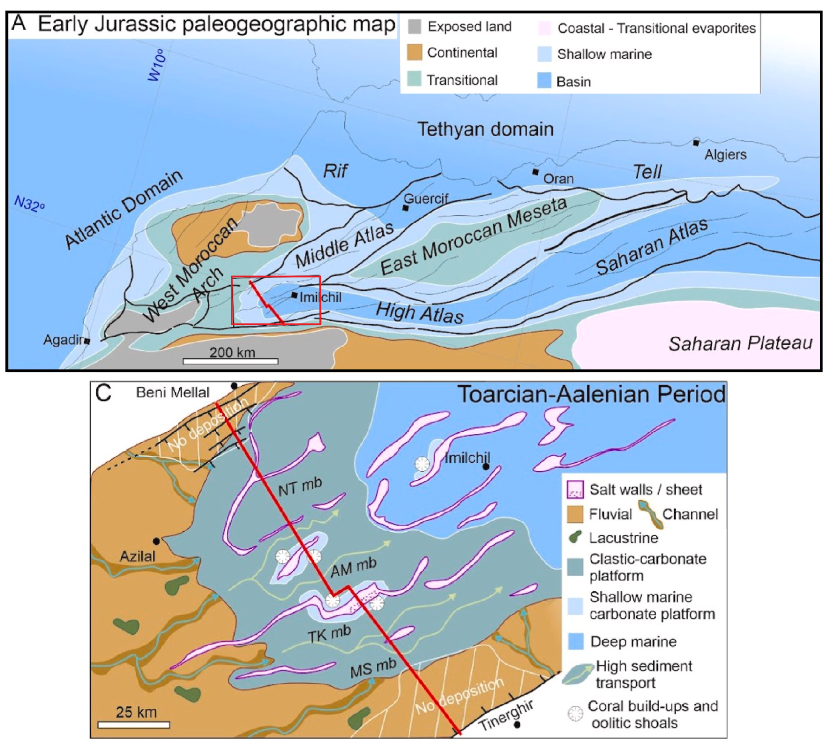
Toarcian-Aalenian Paleogeography of N Africa, with closeup reconstruction of the Zawyat Ahançal Group.

The Zawyat Ahançal Group was deposited on the Central High Atlas Diapiric Rift basin, a Carbonate Platform at a palaeolatitude of 19–20°N, developed between the Anti-Atlas, the West Moroccan Arch, and the Sahara craton.

At the base of the succession, carbonate production was interrupted and replaced by terrigenous input that accumulated in subsiding basins exposed in Telouet, Toundoute, Afourar and Azilal, consisting mainly of continental to fluvial/palustrine facies, with the "Demnate Accident" fault acting as a key structural control. In parallel, more central and eastern regions such as Beni Mellal, the Dadès Gorges, and Zaouiat Ahansal retained mixed carbonate–siliciclastic deposits under marine influence, dated thanks to ammonites and Brachiopods in the basal Tafraout Formation.

Latter in the Lower Toarcian, sedimentation was marked by transgressive–regressive oscillations. The initial regression corresponds to a decline of shallow-water carbonate systems. These beds reflect rapid facies changes driven by continued subsidence and episodic terrigenous influx.

By the Middle Toarcian–Aalenian, carbonate production was reestablished across the platform. The Azilal Formation expanded eastward, with isolated carbonate buildups developing in the Amezraï minibasin while terrigenous sediments persisted along its margins. This interval corresponds to a relative tectonic calm, with differentiated depocenters and localized subsidence, unlike the earlier strongly fault-controlled regime. Fossils, including Aalenian brachiopods (Bradfordensis–Murchinsonae) and coeval ammonites at the Ikerzi area, confirm the continuation of marine deposition and provide a chronological marker for the youngest part of the sequence. Towards its upper levels, the Tafraout Platform records progressive deepening, anticipating the widespread transgressive conditions that culminated in the Bajocian.

The deposition of the E part was controlled by diapirs and associated minibasins (Central High Atlas Jurassic Diapiric Province), that acted as islands surrounded by deeper waters. Northern Atlasic Front transitions from a foreland basin (Tadla Plain) to the Jbel Ighnayene culmination, filled by a homogeneous continental Azilal Fm affected by thrust tectonics and faulting. Next is the Abbadine diapiric complex, with multiple minibasins (Ouaouizaght, Taguelft, and Tilougguite) separated by salt walls (Abbadine and Addendoum) that influenced local sedimentation, with progressive thinning and truncation of Toarcian-Aalenian facies near diapirs. At the Amezraï Minibasin and Tazoult/Jbel Azourki salt walls thick Toarcian-Aalenian sequences formed wedge and hook structures as they adjusted to salt movement, with the development of a megaflap structure. Increased Toarcian sedimentation led to burial of older carbonates and calcite precipitation. In the proper Tafraout area nearby proximal facies are frequently stacked in thick >2 km successions passing to >3 km in the surrounding minibasins. The Ikerzi diapir is surrounded by minibasins with contrasting facies, subtidal at the N the Takrakart while more restricted intertidal the S M'Semrir minibasin. The last sequence, the Southern Atlassic Front represents a transition towards less halokinetically influenced settings, connecting the diapiric structures to broader sedimentary basins. Comparable diapirs exist in the Dead Sea, Red Sea (specially on Gubal Straits and Farasan Banks), and Gulf of Suez.

== Paleoenvironment ==
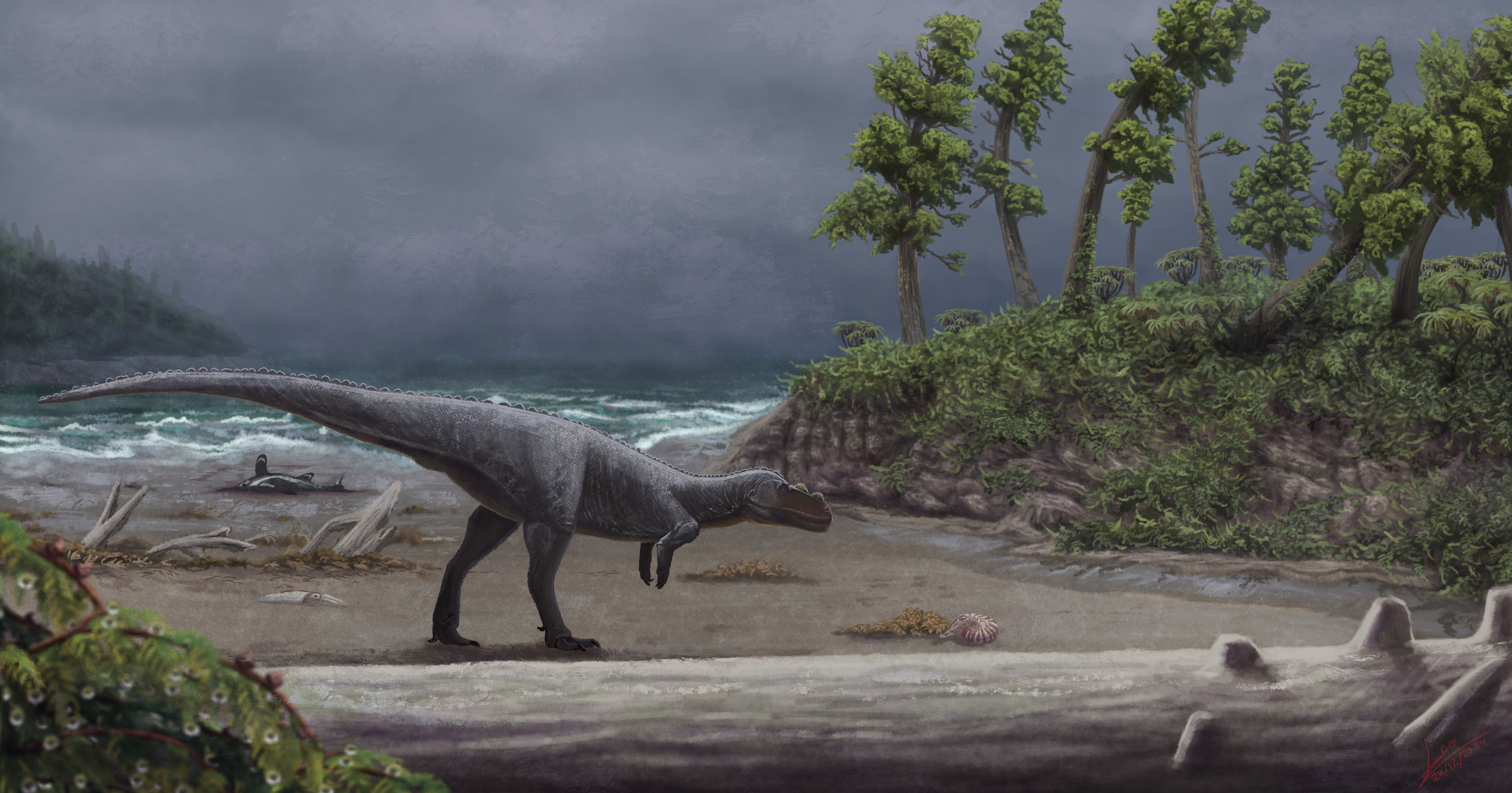
Paleoenvironment reconstruction of the Zawyat Ahançal Group as a storm-influenced coast. Increased local hurricane presence is seen along the Toarcian Oceanic Anoxic Event.

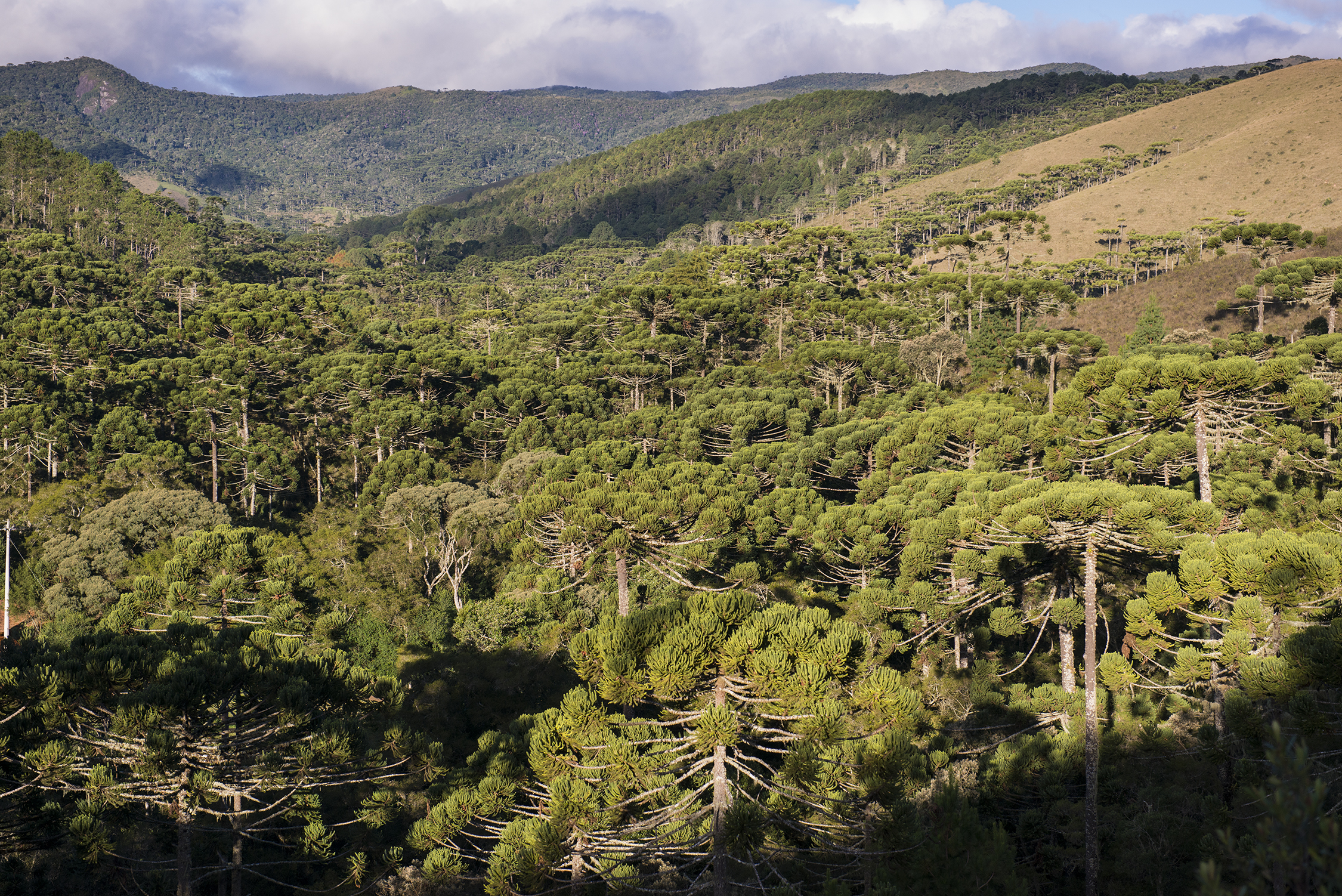
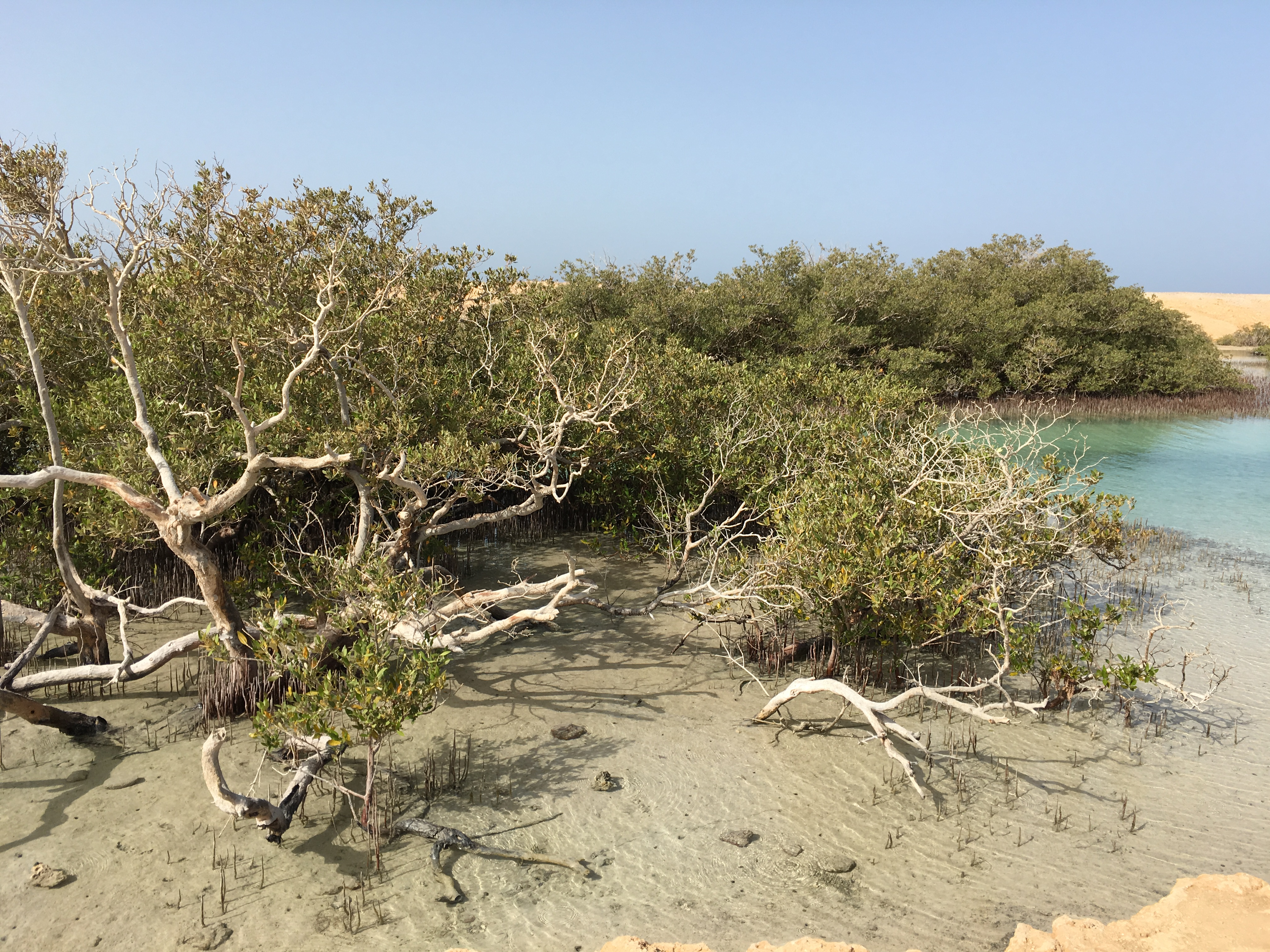
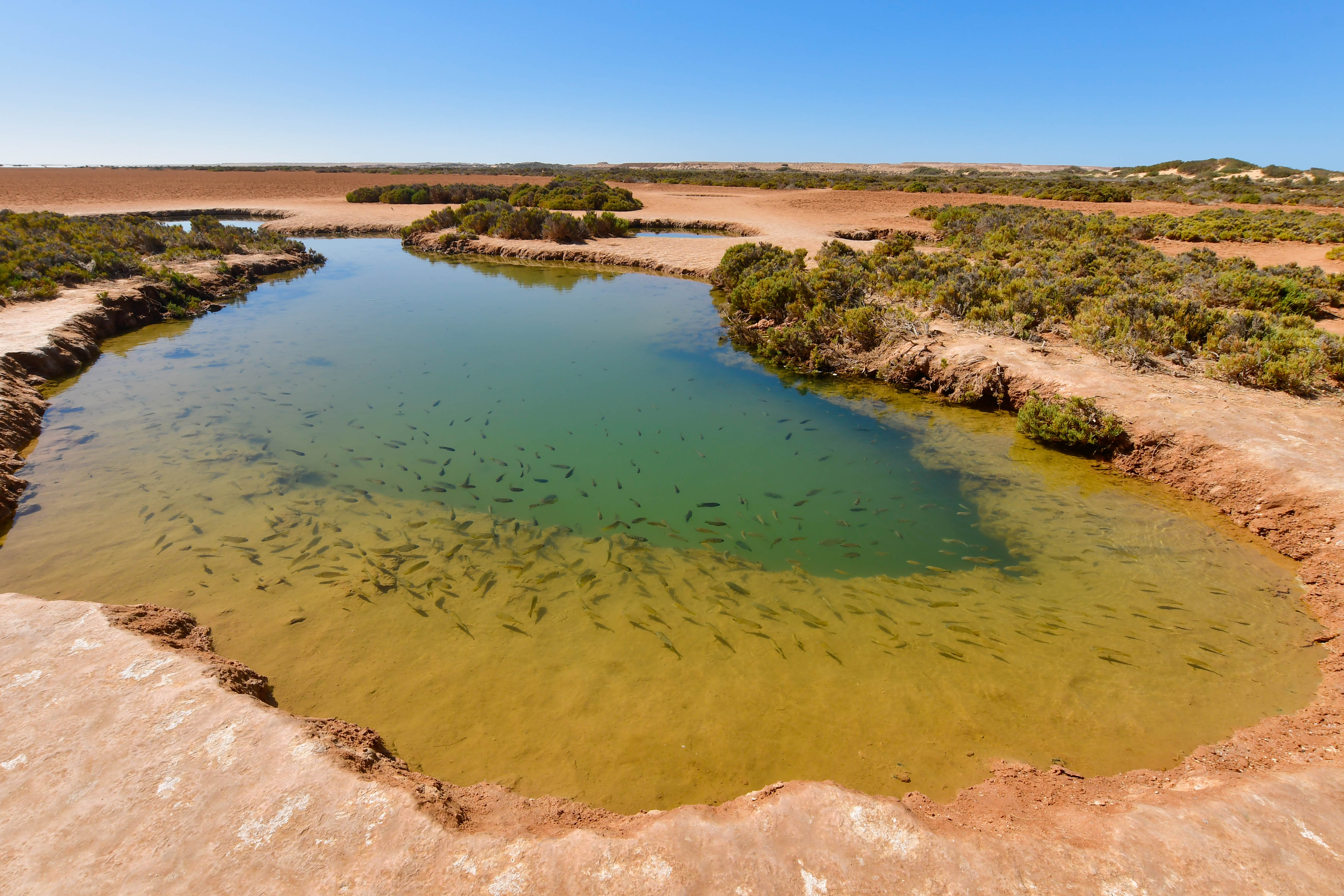
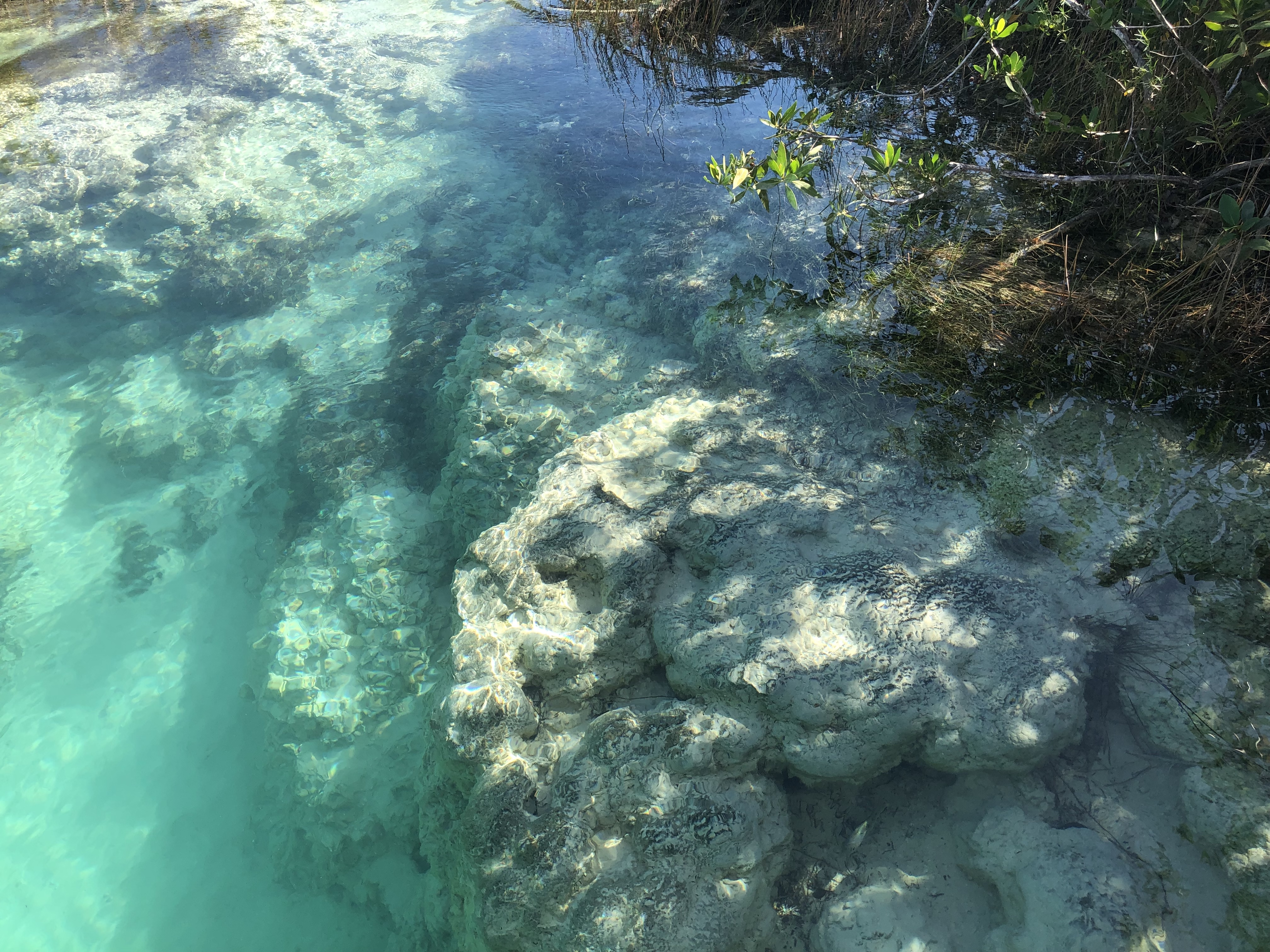
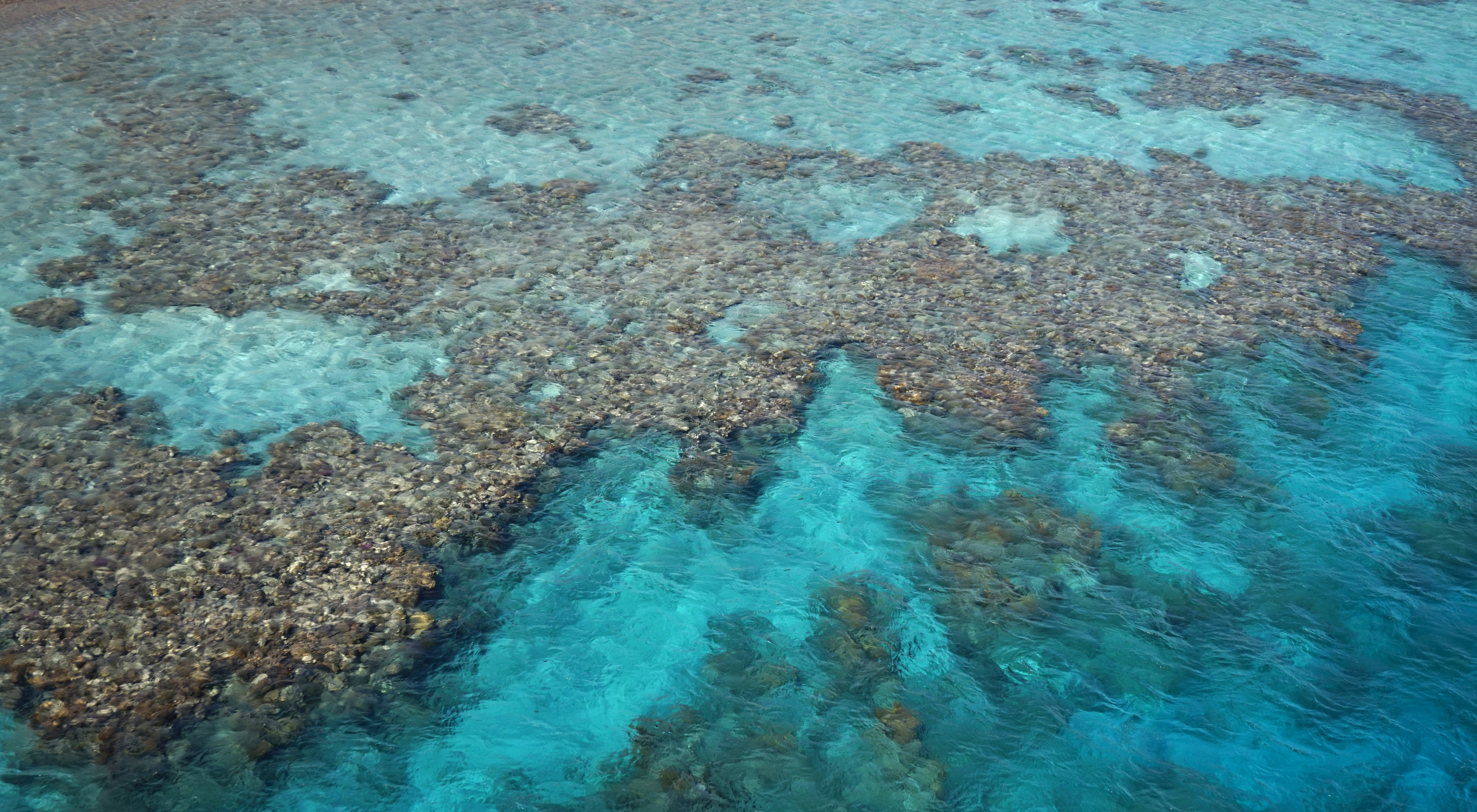
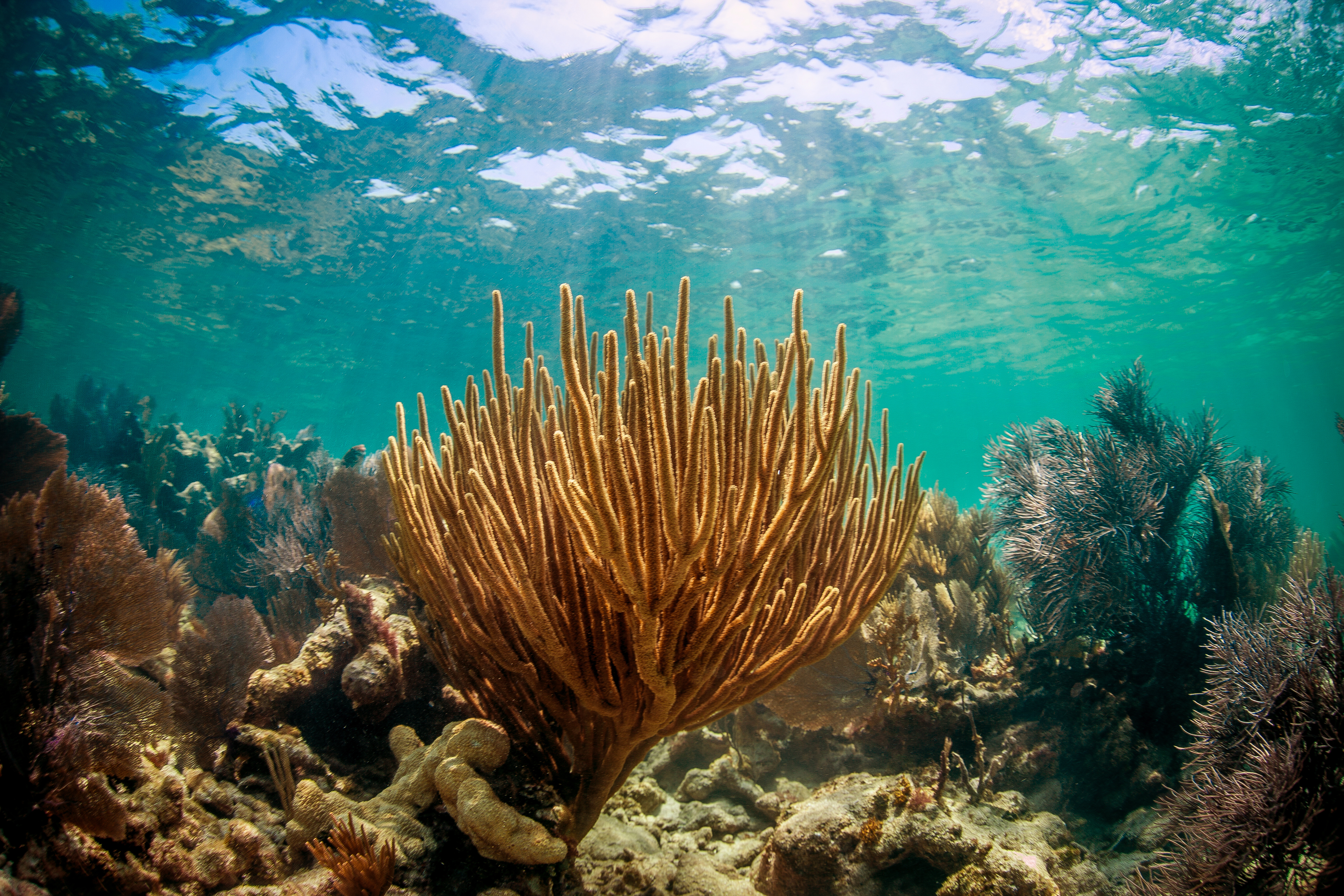
Modern analogues of the Toarcian-Aalenian High Atlas: Highlands moist forests (Ex. Araucaria moist forests); lowland/coastal marshland (ex. Nabq Protected Area); Sabkhas (ex. at Dakhla); mangrove lagoons (ex. Lake Bacalar); reef-rich shallow sea (ex. Red Sea) with bivalve-coral reefs (ex. Florida Keys National Marine Sanctuary)

The Zawyat Ahançal Group covers most of the W High Atlas, surrounded by highlands that probably hosted rain tundra to wet forest environments, as proven by samples from coeval layers in the External Rif Chain. The Continental section was deposited in environments influenced by floodplain rivers, with reworked material and in Toundoute unique interbedded volcanic rocks, with carbonate recrystallization suggesting were contemporaneous with the sedimentation, probably derived from early activity in the South-Atlasic Fault. The direction of the fluvial sediments take place in a E-NE direction, as shown on channels inside the own rocks of this unit. This layers also saw high plant activity, with remains such as wood, charcoal, and rhizoliths, indicating nearby vegetated soils. Other features include Raindrop impressions and ripple marks indicating floodplains, with lateral sand channels abundant in plant roots, along with evidence of ephemeral palustrine (Sabkhas, Chotts) episodes in the form of carbonate bodies (Caliche/Calcrete levels), intercalated with conglomerates and gypsum, particularly in areas like Azilal, Toundoute and Telouet. This continental facies were sourced by rivers flowing from nearby W-Central Anti-Atlas, indicated by abundant Paleozoic or Proterozoic pebbles of metamorphic and igneous rocks concentrated in the W part of the basin.

Multiple coastal or transitional sectors can be seen at Jbel Mesgounane, Beni Mellal, At Aït Bouguemez, Dadés Valley and Talmest-Tazoult recording sea-level fluctuations and tectonic influences. The Lower Toarcian shows high-energy western deposits and eastern coal and oolitic carbonates, with transgressive phases marked by slumping and reefs, indicating a deltaic environment, and highstand/lowstand phases. Younger layers show a carbonate platform shifting from inter- to supratidal settings.

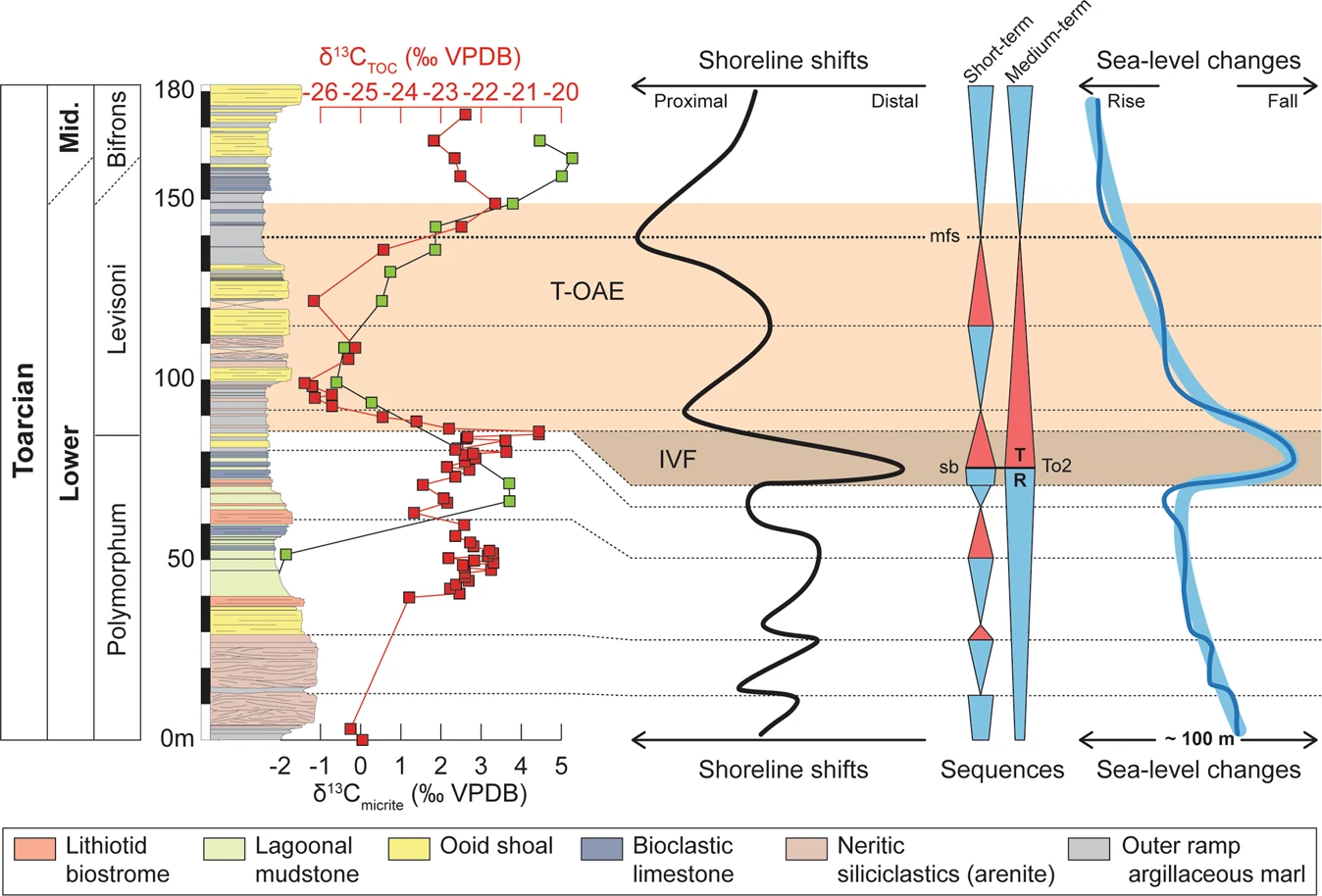
Summary of shoreline shifts within the group and inferred sea-level changes as deduced from the Dadès Gorges record

In the marine sectors initially, a shift to siliciclastic deposits occurred, marked by storm events and increased plant debris, indicating a warm, humid climate. They are interpreted as deposits in a transitional subtidal to supratidal environment. High-energy shallow water conditions are indicated by oolitic and biodetrital limestones, while monospecific organism enrichments hint at restrictive lagoonal settings. Despite similarities with the Aganane Formations, the carbonate content decreases, and sedimentation interruptions are marked by hardgrounds, with carbonate detritus linked to erosion of nearby platforms. The second member reflects a significant environmental shift from shallow to deeper water conditions. Its basal part was a high-energy shallow water sequence with biostromes of large bivalves (Plicatostylidae) and Scleractinians. However, alternating grey-green marls and ammonite-bearing sequences on the hanging wall suggest open marine conditions and distal turbidites, similar to the lowermost Agoudim Formation. The third member was deposited within the Toarcian Oceanic Anoxic Event and is characterized by a monotonous organism spectrum, pointing to restrictive living conditions, under a high subsidence rate, estimated at 0.4 mm/year. Carbonate production stopped, causing local extinctions. Proximal turbidites, with shallow water organisms and plant remains suggesting sediment relocation via channels on submarine slopes and mudcracks further suggest periodic emersion. The Toarcian Oceanic Anoxic Event locally intensified Tropical storms, destroying older carbonate platforms and increasing siliciclastic deposits. Finally, the fourth member records the return of the carbonate factory, dominated by corals, reflecting deposition on a continuously deepening platform where subsidence outpaced sedimentation. A major fall of the sea level happened in the Middle Toarcian-Aalenian, with the recovery of coral reefs (though now with barely few Plicatostylidae). The eastern and northeastern High Atlas saw this re-development along tectonic activity during the Late Toarcian. Plant remains in the lower part indicate a nearby supply area, while the depositional environment ranges from supratidal to subtidal, recording microlagoons between coral patch reefs marked by the presence of micrite. There is also evidence of more smaller extinctions, like a Middle Toarcian (Variabilis/Gradata ammonite zone) cold snap, followed by a return to warmer conditions. The last sequence is made up of the Azilal Formation were corals, benthic fauna, ooids and the observed structural features indicate deposition in an even shallower water, along with periodic emersions.

Carbonate production resumed only after Pli/Toar boundary and reduced siliciclastic influx, restoring shallow marine conditions but still with relatively high turbidity and nutrients. Reef recovery occurred in two phases: first, lithiotid bivalves rebuilt lagoonal biostromes in shallow, moderately turbid waters. Later, as conditions deepened and became more oligotrophic, sponge–coral–microbialite patch reefs reappeared, mainly in shoreface to deeper settings.

== Biota ==
Beds with large accumulations of unidentified Ostracod valves on an endemic thin level of green marl are found at the Beni-Mellal area (Adoumaz and Col de Ghnim outcrops).

Color key: Taxon / Reclassified taxon / Taxon falsely reported as present / Dubious taxon or junior synonym / Ichnotaxon / Ootaxon / Morphotaxon	Notes; Uncertain or tentative taxa are in small text; ~~crossed out~~ taxa are discredited.

=== Foraminifera ===
Genus/Family	Species	Location	Formation	Age	Material	Notes	Images
Ammobaculites	A. coprolithiformis	Ouguerd Zegzaoune	Tafraout	Late Toarcian	Tests	Ammomarginulininae.	
Everticyclammina	E. sp.	Aguerd N´Igli; Aguerd N´Wahmane; Col de Ghnim; Ouguerd Zegzaoune; Tizi n-M´Barek	Tafraout	Early-Late Toarcian	Tests	Everticyclamminidae.	
Glomospira	G. sp.	Jebel Toksine; Ouguerd Zegzaoune	Tafraout	Early-Middle Toarcian	Tests	Ammodiscidae.	
Glomospirella	G. sp.	Jebel Toksine	Tafraout	Early Toarcian	Tests	Ammovertellininae.	
Haurania	H. deserta	Jebel Toksine	Tafraout	Early Toarcian	Tests	Hauraniinae.	
Lenticulina	L. münsteri	Anergui	Tafraout	Early-Late Toarcian	Tests	Lenticulininae.	
Lenticulina	L. toarcense	Anergui	Tafraout	Early-Late Toarcian	Tests	Lenticulininae.	
Lenticulina	L. chichery	Anergui	Tafraout	Early-Late Toarcian	Tests	Lenticulininae.	
Lenticulina	L. sp.	Anergui	Tafraout	Early-Late Toarcian	Tests	Lenticulininae.	
Meandrospira	M. sp.	Aguerd N´Igli; Aguerd N´Wahmane; Timghissine; Tizi n-M´Barek	Azilal; Tafraout	Toarcian-Aalenian	Tests	Cornuspiridae.	
Mesoendothyra	M. croatica	Aguerd N´Igli; Aguerd N´Wahmane; La Cathédrale; Tizi n-M´Barek; Timghissine	Azilal; Tafraout	Toarcian-Aalenian	Tests	Mesoendothyridae.	
Mesoendothyra	M. izjumiana	Aguerd N´Igli	Azilal	Aalenian	Tests	Mesoendothyridae.	
Neotrocholina	N. sp.	Aguerd N´Igli	Azilal	Aalenian	Tests	Mesoendothyridae.	
Nodosaria	N. sexcostata	Anergui	Tafraout	Early-Late Toarcian	Tests	Nodosariinae.	
Nodosaria	N. fontinensis	Anergui	Tafraout	Early-Late Toarcian	Tests	Nodosariinae.	
Nodosaria	N. sp.	Jebel Toksine; Ouguerd Zegzaoune	Tafraout	Early-Late Toarcian	Tests	Nodosariinae.	
Ophtalmidium	O. concentricum	Aguerd N´Igli; Anergui; Ilourhmane	Tafraout	Early-Middle Toarcian	Tests	Ophthalmidiidae.	
Ophtalmidium	O. sp.	Jebel Toksine; Ouguerd Zegzaoune	Tafraout	Early-Middle Toarcian	Tests	Ophthalmidiidae.	
Orbitopsella	O. praecursor	Col de Ghnim	Tafraout	Early Toarcian	Tests	Orbitopsellinae.	
Platyhaurania	P. subcompressa	Koumch	Tafraout	Middle-Late Toarcian	Tests	Hauraniinae.	
Pseudocyclammina	P. sp.	Aguerd N´Igli	Azilal; Tafraout	Toarcian-Aalenian	Tests	Hauraniidae.	
Placopsilina	P. sp	Ouguerd Zegzaoune	Tafraout	Middle Toarcian	Tests	Placopsilinidae.	
Reinholdella	R. sp.	Anergui	Tafraout	Early-Late Toarcian	Tests	Ceratobuliminidae.	
Siphovalvulina	S. colomi	Jebel Toksine	Tafraout	Early Toarcian	Tests	Pseudopfenderininae.	
Siphovalvulina	S. gibraltarensis	Jebel Toksine	Tafraout	Early Toarcian	Tests	Pseudopfenderininae.	
Siphovalvulina	S. sp	Aguerd N´Wahmane; Ouguerd Zegzaoune	Tafraout	Middle Toarcian-Aalenian	Tests	Pseudopfenderininae.	
Spirillina	S. numismalis	Anergui	Tafraout	Early-Late Toarcian	Tests	Spirillinidae	
Timidonella	T. sarda	Aguerd N´Wahmane; Jbel Akenzoud; Tizi n-M´Barek	Azilal	Aalenian	Tests	Hauraniinae.	
Valvulina	V. sp.	Aguerd N´Wahmane	Azilal	Aalenian	Tests	Valvulinidae.	

=== Ichnofossils ===
Ichnogenus/Ichnofamily	Ichnospecies	Location	Formation	Age	Made by	Images
Arenicolites	A. ispp.	Bou-Oumardoul; Jbel Taguendouft; Jebel Toksine	Tafraout	Middle-Late Toarcian	Amphipoda; Arenicolidae; Capitellidae; Sipuncula; Spionida	Arenicolites specimens from Mongolia
Rhizocorallium	R. ispp.	Jbel Akenzoud; Jebel Toksine	Azilal; Tafraout	Toarcian-Aalenian	Actinopterygii; Decapoda; Polychaeta	Rhizocorallium from Australia
Thalassinoides	T. ispp.	Ouguerd Zegzaoune	Tafraout	Middle Toarcian	Actinopteri; Anomura; Decapoda; Dipnoi; Polychaeta; Sipuncula	Thalassinoides from France

=== Porifera ===
Genus/Family	Species	Location	Formation	Age	Material	Notes	Images
Calcispongiae indet.	Indeterminate	Jbel Akenzoud	Tafraout	Lower Toarcian	Imprints	Calcareous sponge	
Chaetetida indet.	Indeterminate	Jebel Toksine; Ouguerd Zegzaoune; Tilout; Toumliline	Tafraout	Lower-Middle Toarcian	Imprints	Hyper-calcified demosponge.	
Cladocoropsis	C. mirabilis	Aguerd N´Wahmane	Tafraout	Lower Toarcian	Imprints	Cladocoropsidae axinellidan.	Extant relative, Axinella
Entobia	E. ispp.	Ouguerd Zegzaoune	Tafraout	Lower Toarcian	Borings	Sponge borings equivalent to extant Clionaidae.	
"Sphinctozoa" indet.	Indeterminate	Ait Attouch; Toumliline	Tafraout	Lower Toarcian	Imprints	Chambered demosponge.	
Stromatoporoidea indet.	Indeterminate	Jbel Akenzoud; Jebel Toksine; Ouguerd Zegzaoune; Tilout; Toumliline	Tafraout	Lower-Middle Toarcian	Imprints	Encrusting demosponge.	
Stylothalamia	S. columnaris	Jbel Akenzoud; Ouguerd Zegzaoune; Tilout; Toumliline	Tafraout	Lower-Middle Toarcian	Imprints	Verticillitidae Dictyoceratidan.	

=== Anthozoa ===
Currently non-sampled important assamblages include:

- In the Dadés-Assif Tafraout areas large coral patch reefs rarely occur in the middle of the unit with associated echinodems (sea urchin spines, crinoid fragments) bivalves, gastropods, Bryozoa, serpulid annelids, branchiopods, solitary corals and algae. The upper platform patch reefs in the Assif Tafraout area are hovewer notable for their biodiversity, with some reaching heights of up to 40 m and lengths of up to 80 m, representing massive biostromes with a varied associated fossil assemblage, including bivalves, echinoderms, algal mounds, bivalve enrichments, gastropods, serpulid clusters, solitary corals and bryozoans in the area between bioherms.
- The Ait Allal reef complex appears in the form of lenticular constructed masses (10 to 30 m long, 10 to 15 m wide and 3 to 4 m high) which pass laterally, towards the south-east and the north-east, to sandstone horizons.
- Massive reef pinnacles are recovered at Anergui and northern flank of Tassent (Imilchil), while rarer ones are known from Bou Zemou.

Genus/Family	Species	Location	Formation	Age	Material	Notes	Images
Actinaraea?	A.? sp.	Jebel Toksine	Tafraout	Lower Toarcian	Imprints	Actinacididae stony coral.	Actinaraea specimen
Actinastreidae indet.	Indeterminate	Ouguerd Zegzaoune	Tafraout	Lower Toarcian	Imprints	Stony coral.	
Allocoenia	A. "sp. 1"	Jebel Toksine	Tafraout	Lower Toarcian	Imprints	Actinastreidae stony coral.	
Ampakabastraea	A. ampakabensis	Jebel Toksine	Tafraout	Lower Toarcian	Imprints	Stylinidae stony coral.	
Ampakabastraea	A. sp.	Jebel Toksine	Tafraout	Lower Toarcian	Imprints	Stylinidae stony coral.	
Archaeosmilia	A. beata	Jebel Toksine; Maez near Tasmlelete	Tafraout	Lower Toarcian	Imprints	Intersmiliidae hexanthiniarian.	
Archaeosmilia	A.sp.	Jebel Toksine; Maez near Tasmlelete	Tafraout	Lower Toarcian	Imprints	Intersmiliidae hexanthiniarian.	
Archaeosmiliopsis	A. densus	Jebel Toksine	Tafraout	Lower Toarcian	Imprints	Intersmiliidae hexanthiniarian.	
Archaeosmiliopsis	A. sp.	Jebel Toksine; Ouguerd Zegzaoune	Tafraout	Lower Toarcian	Imprints	Intersmiliidae hexanthiniarian.	
Archaeosmiliopsis	A.? sp.	Jebel Toksine; Ouguerd Zegzaoune	Tafraout	Lower Toarcian	Imprints	Intersmiliidae hexanthiniarian.	
Carolastraea?	C.? sp.	Toumliline	Tafraout	Lower Toarcian	Imprints	Carolastraeidae stony coral.	
Cladophyllia	C?. sp.	Ouguerd Zegzaoune	Tafraout	Lower Toarcian	Imprints	Cladophylliidae stony coral.	
Comoseridae indet.	Indeterminate	Ouguerd Zegzaoune	Tafraout	Lower Toarcian	Imprints	Stony coral.	
Complexastrea	C. sp.	Ouguerd Zegzaoune	Tafraout	Lower Toarcian	Imprints	Thecosmiliidae stony coral.	
Enallhelia?	E.? sp.	Jebel Toksine; Tilout	Tafraout	Lower Toarcian	Imprints	Stylinidae stony coral.	Enallhelia specimen
Eocomoseris	E. sp.	Ouguerd Zegzaoune; Tilout; Toumliline	Tafraout	Lower Toarcian	Imprints	Comoseridae stony coral.	
Haimeicyclus	H. haimei	Jebel Toksine	Tafraout	Lower Toarcian	Imprints	Oppelismiliidae stony coral.	
Haimeicyclus	H. sp.	Jebel Toksine	Tafraout	Lower Toarcian	Imprints	Oppelismiliidae stony coral.	
Hispaniastraea	H. murciana	Jebel Toksine; Ouguerd Zegzaoune	Tafraout	Lower Toarcian	Imprints	Hispaniastraeidae hexanthiniarian.	
Hispaniastraea	H. ousriorum	Ouguerd Zegzaoune	Tafraout	Lower Toarcian	Imprints	Hispaniastraeidae hexanthiniarian.	
Hispaniastraea	H. sp.	Zahouiat Ahansal	Tafraout	Lower Toarcian	Imprints	Hispaniastraeidae hexanthiniarian.	
Icaunhelia	I. sp.	Jebel Toksine; Maez near Tasmlelete	Tafraout	Lower Toarcian	Imprints	Archaeosmiliidae stony coral.	
Isastrea	I. toarciensis	Jebel Toksine	Tafraout	Lower Toarcian	Imprints	Thecosmiliidae stony coral.	Isastrea specimen
Isastrea	I. sp.	Jebel Toksine; Ouguerd Zegzaoune	Tafraout	Lower Toarcian	Imprints	Thecosmiliidae stony coral.	Isastrea specimen
Isastrocoenia?	I.? sp.	Ouguerd Zegzaoune	Tafraout	Late Toarcian	Imprints	Thecosmiliidae stony coral.	
Latiastrea	L. sp.	Ouguerd Zegzaoune	Tafraout	Lower Toarcian	Imprints	Latomeandridae stony coral.	
Latomeandra	L. sp.	Tilout; Toumliline; Ouguerd Zegzaoune	Tafraout	Lower Toarcian	Imprints	Latomeandridae stony coral.	
Latomeandridae indet.	Indeterminate	Ouguerd Zegzaoune	Tafraout	Lower Toarcian	Imprints	Stony coral.	
Lochmaeosmilia	L. sp.	Ouguerd Zegzaoune	Tafraout	Lower Toarcian	Imprints	Latomeandridae stony coral.	
Lophelia?	L.? sp.	Jebel Toksine	Tafraout	Lower Toarcian	Imprints	Carophylliidae stony coral.	Lophelia specimens
Myriophyllum	M. fasciatum	Jebel Toksine	Tafraout	Lower Toarcian	Imprints	Oppelismiliidae stony coral.	
Periseris	P. elegantula	Jebel Toksine	Tafraout	Lower Toarcian	Imprints	Latomeandridae stony coral.	
Periseris	P. sp.	Jebel Toksine; Ouguerd Zegzaoune	Tafraout	Lower Toarcian	Imprints	Latomeandridae stony coral.	
Phacelophyllia	P. termieri	Jebel Toksine	Tafraout	Lower Toarcian	Imprints	Dermosmiliidae stony coral.	
Phacelophyllia	P. sp.	Jebel Toksine	Tafraout	Lower Toarcian	Imprints	Dermosmiliidae stony coral.	
Phacelostylophyllum	P. cf. subdichotomum	Jebel Toksine	Tafraout	Lower Toarcian	Imprints	Stylophyllidae stony coral.	
Phacelostylophyllum	P. sp.	Maez near Tasmlelete	Tafraout	Lower Toarcian	Imprints	Stylophyllidae stony coral.	
Proaplophyllia?	P.? sp.	Jebel Toksine	Tafraout	Lower Toarcian	Imprints	Stylinidae stony coral.	
Spongiocoenia	S. liasica	Jebel Toksine	Tafraout	Lower Toarcian	Imprints	Stylophyllidae stony coral.	
Stylosmilia	S. "sp. 1"	Ouguerd Zegzaoune	Tafraout	Middle Toarcian	Imprints	Stylinidae stony coral.	
Thecactinastraea	T. fasciculata	Jebel Toksine	Tafraout	Lower Toarcian	Imprints	Oppelismiliidae stony coral.	
Thecactinastraea	T. sp.	Jebel Toksine	Tafraout	Lower Toarcian	Imprints	Oppelismiliidae stony coral.	
Thecosmilia	T. "sp. 3"	Ouguerd Zegzaoune	Tafraout	Middle Toarcian	Imprints	Thecosmiliidae stony coral.	Thecosmilia specimens
Thecosmilia	T. sp.	Ouguerd Zegzaoune	Tafraout	Middle Toarcian	Imprints	Thecosmiliidae stony coral.	Thecosmilia specimens
Vallimeandropsis?	V.? sp.	Ouguerd Zegzaoune	Tafraout	Lower Toarcian	Imprints	Thecosmiliidae stony coral.	
Zardinophyllidae indet.	Indeterminate	Jebel Toksine	Tafraout	Lower Toarcian	Imprints	Hexanthiniarian.	

=== Brachiopoda ===
Genus/Family	Species	Location	Formation	Age	Material	Notes	Images
Curtirhynchia	C. benacensis	Aguerd N´Igli; Aït Allal; La Cathédrale; Tizi n-M'Barek	Azilal	Aalenian	Shells	Tetrarhynchiidae.	
Globirhynchia	G. subobsoleta	Aguerd N´Igli; Aït Allal; La Cathédrale; Tizi n-M'Barek	Azilal	Aalenian	Shells	Rhynchonellidae.	
Homoeorhynchia	H. meridionalis	Ouguerd Zegzaoune	Tafraout	Lower Toarcian	Shells	Rhynchonellinae.	
Homoeorhynchia	H. batalleri	Ouguerd Zegzaoune	Tafraout	Lower Toarcian	Shells	Rhynchonellinae.	
Liospiriferina	L. falloti	Aghbalou N'Kerdous	Tafraout	Lower Toarcian	Shells	Spiriferinidae.	Liospiriferina specimens (from Spain)
Liospiriferina	L. undulata	Jbel Toksine	Tafraout	Lower Toarcian	Shells	Spiriferinidae.	Liospiriferina specimens (from Spain)
Liospiriferina	L. sp.	Aghbalou N'Kerdous	Tafraout	Lower Toarcian	Shells	Spiriferinidae.	Liospiriferina specimens (from Spain)
Lobothyris	L. sp.	Aït Allal; Jbel Toksine; Timghissine	Tafraout	Lower Toarcian	Shells	Lobothyrididae.	Lobothyris specimen (from Spain)
Pseudogibbirhynchia	P. jurensis	Aguerd N´Igli; Aït Allal; Ouguerd Zegzaoune	Tafraout	Lower-Middle Toarcian	Shells	Pamirorhynchiinae.	
Soaresirhynchia	S. bouchardi	Aguerd N´Igli; Aït Allal; Jbel Toksine; Ouguerd Zegzaoune	Tafraout	Lower Toarcian	Shells	Basiliolinae.	Soaresirhynchia specimen (from Spain)
Soaresirhynchia	S. babtisrensis	Aguerd N´Igli; Aït Allal; Ouguerd Zegzaoune	Tafraout	Lower-Middle Toarcian	Shells	Basiliolinae.	Soaresirhynchia specimen (from Spain)
Stroudithyris	S. infraoolithica	Boumardoul n'Imazighn; Jebel Toksine	Tafraout	Late Toarcian	Shells	Lissajousithyrididae.	
Stroudithyris	S. pisolithica	Aguerd N´Igli; Aït Allal; La Cathédrale; Tizi n-M'Barek	Azilal	Aalenian	Shells	Lissajousithyrididae.	
Stroudithyris	S. stephanoides	Jbel Akenzoud	Azilal	Late Toarcian-Aalenian	Shells	Lissajousithyrididae.	
Telothyris	T. jauberti	Ouguerd Zegzaoune	Tafraout	Lower Toarcian	Shells	Lobothyrididae.	
Telothyris	T. arnaudi	Ouguerd Zegzaoune	Tafraout	Lower Toarcian	Shells	Lobothyrididae.	
Zeilleria	Z. (Zeilleria) sarthacensis	Aït Allal; Timghissine	Tafraout	Lower Toarcian	Shells	Zeilleriidae.	Zeilleria specimens (from Spain)
Zeilleria	Z. culeiformis	Aghbalou N'Kerdous; Jbel Toksine	Tafraout	Lower Toarcian	Shells	Zeilleriidae.	Zeilleria specimens (from Spain)

=== Mollusks ===
Multiple gastropod faunas are known, specially associated with coral patch reefs, but these lack proper studies.

Genus/Family	Species	Location	Formation	Age	Material	Notes	Images
Alocolytoceras	A. gr. ophioneum	Anergui	Tafraout	Late Toarcian	Shells	Lytoceratidae ammonite.	
Bositra	B. ssp.	Douar Tafraout	Tafraout	Lower Toarcian	Shells	Aulacomyellidae clam.	
Cochlearites	C. loppianus	Agoundal-n-Ilamchane; Aït-Haceïne; Aït Hsayn; Jbel Akenzoud; Jebel Toksine; Maez near Tasmlelete; S de l'oued Ahansal; Tagoajimt-n-Tcouyant; Tagounit; Tilout; Tillouguit; Tizi-n-Taghbolila; Tizi-n-Tahramt; Zaouiat Ahançal	Tafraout	Lower Toarcian	Shells	Plicatostylidae oyster.	Cochlearites
Gastrochaenolites	G. ispp.	Ouguerd Zegzaoune	Tafraout	Lower Toarcian	Borings	Bivalve borings on corals.	
Gervillioperna	G. spp.	Jebel Toksine	Tafraout	Lower Toarcian	Shells	Plicatostylidae oyster.	Gervillioperna
Hildoceras	H. sublevisoni	Tamadout	Tafraout	Lower-Middle Toarcian	Shells	Hildoceratidae ammonite.	Reconstruction
Hildoceras	H. spp.	Ouguerd Zegzaoune	Tafraout	Lower-Middle Toarcian	Shells	Hildoceratidae ammonite.	Reconstruction
Lithioperna	L. scutata	Agoundal-n-Ilamchane; Aït-Haceïne; Aït Hsayn; Jbel Akenzoud; Jebel Toksine; Maez near Tasmlelete; S de l'oued Ahansal; Tagoajimt-n-Tcouyant; Tagounit; Tilout; Tillouguit; Tizi-n-Taghbolila; Tizi-n-Tahramt; Zaouiat Ahançal	Tafraout	Lower Toarcian	Shells	Plicatostylidae oyster.	Lithioperna
Nerinea	N. spp.	Jebel Toksine; Ouguerd Zegzaoune	Tafraout	Lower Toarcian	Shells	Nerineidae snail.	Specimen of the genus
Pachygervillia	P. anguillaensis	Jebel Toksine	Tafraout	Lower Toarcian	Shells	Plicatostylidae oyster.	Pachygervillia
Opisoma	O. menchikoffi	Agoundal-n-Ilamchane; Aït-Haceïne; Aït Hsayn; Jbel Akenzoud; Jebel Toksine; S de l'oued Ahansal; Tagoajimt-n-Tcouyant; Tagounit; Tillouguit; Tizi-n-Taghbolila; Tizi-n-Tahramt; Zaouiat Ahançal	Tafraout	Lower Toarcian	Shells	Astartidae clam.	
Pachyrisma	P. (Durga) ssp.	Aït-Haceïne; S de l'oued Ahansal; Tagounit; Tillouguit	Tafraout	Lower Toarcian	Shells	Pachyrismatidae clam	
Planammatoceras	P. cf.spinosum	SW of Anergui	Tafraout	Middle Aalenian	Shells	Hammatoceratidae ammonite.	
Scurriopsis	S. spp.	Jebel Toksine	Tafraout	Lower Toarcian	Shells	Acmaeidae limpet.	Modern Scurria specimens
Trichites	T. spp.	Jbel Akenzoud; Maez near Tasmlelete; Tilout; Toumliline	Tafraout	Lower Toarcian	Shells	Pinnidae clam.	

=== Echinodermata ===
Multiple echinoderm remains, including crinoid articulated and fragmentary specimens and echinoid fragments (mostly spines and plates), are known from several localities, usually associated with large coral bioherms or sea trangressions.

Genus/Family	Species	Location	Formation	Age	Material	Notes	Images
Arbacioida indet.	Indeterminate	Jebel Toksine	Tafraout	Lower Toarcian	Ambulacrum	Sea urchin	Arbacia
Pentacrinites	P. spp.	Jebel Akenzoud	Tafraout	Middle Toarcian	Columnar ossicles	Pentacrinitidae crinoid	Reconstruction of a few specimens

=== Annelida ===
Genus/Family	Species	Location	Material	Formation	Age	Notes	Images
Serpulidae indet.	Indeterminate	Aghbalou N'Kerdous; Douar Tafraout; Jebel Akenzoud; Jebel Toksine; Ouguerd Zegzaoune; Toumliline	Tubes	Tafraout	Toarcian-Aalenian	Accumulations of tubes are seen along bioherms	Example of modern Serpulid Tube

=== Dinosauria ===
Indeterminate dinosaurian and other vertebrates are known from Mizaguène Hill, Taouja Ougourane, Aït Ouaridène, Oued Rzef and Jbel Remuai in the Azilal Province. Some of them are recovered in a "Bone bed" and others are associated with abundant plant remains.

Genus/Family	Species	Location	Formation	Age	Material	Notes	Images
Berberosaurus	B. liassicus	Toundoute	Azilal	Toarcian	Holotype: Neck vertebra, part of the sacrum, a metacarpal, a femur, and parts of a tibia and both fibulae. Part of another femur has been assigned to the genus as well.; The axis, a postorbital, the endocranium and teeth are currently being studied.	A theropod originally referred to Abelisauroidea, but may represent a basal ceratosaur instead.	Berberosaurus life restoration
Coelophysidae indet.	Unnamed	Acforcid, Wazzant	Azilal	Toarcian	Two adults and one recently hatched juvenile: At least the posterior half of the skeleton is present: caudal, sacral, dorsal vertebrae, pelvis and both hind legs	Assigned based on the "apparent fusion between distal tarsal III and metatarsal III". Was proposed as a possible tetanuran or a coelurosaur, even compared with the Australian genus Kakuru, but the latter was actively dismissed.	Segisaurus, a coeval or older genus of the same family from North America
Eusauropoda indet.	Unnamed	Mizaguène Hill, 3 km at the SW of Azilal	Azilal	Toarcian	5 dorsal and caudal vertebrae, fragmentary ribs, chevrons and several large badly determinable debris	Was collected from a freshwater lagoonal depositional setting.	
Gravisauria indet.	Indeterminate	E of Azilal	Azilal	Toarcian	Pubis and other indeterminate remains	Quoted to resemble Tazoudasaurus, maybe another specimen of the genus.	
Large theropod indet.	Unnamed	Toundoute	Azilal	Toarcian	Phalanges and several non mentioned remains	Described as a "large theropod of uncertain affinities", "enigmatic theropod" or as a theropod showing "a size larger than any of the know theropods of the Triassic-Early Jurassic know, indicating that Toarcian theropods had sizes rivaling that of late Jurassic allosaurs".	
Sauropoda indet.	Indeterminate	Acforcid, Wazzant	Azilal	Toarcian	Left ilium, a humerus and three vertebrae	A small-sized sauropod.	
Sauropoda indet.	Indeterminate	S of Aït Bouzid	Azilal	Toarcian	One or more vertebrae	Thought to be found in Cretaceous strata	
Sauropoda indet.	Indeterminate	Dar Ou Hammou; Taouja Ougourane	Azilal	Toarcian	Uncertain remains	Incertade sedis.	
Tazoudasaurus	T. naimi	Toundoute	Azilal	Toarcian	Around 10 different specimens: Partially articulated skeleton and cranial material including complete left mandible with teeth, quadrate, jugal, postorbital, parietal, frontal and exoccipital. Associated remains of a juvenile skeleton.	A gravisaurian sauropod of the family Vulcanodontidae.	Size comparison of Tazoudasaurus naimi
Theropoda? indet.	Indeterminate	W of Azilal town	Azilal	Toarcian	Footprints	Incertade sedis.	

=== "Flora" ===
Paleosols in regions like Beni Mellal, Azilal, Wazzant or Toundoute show many plant roots (rhizoliths) and heavily disturbed layers. Other plant remains include coal beds, leaflets, cuticles, rhizoliths, fossil wood and other indeterminate plant debris.

Non studied rich floral assamblages include:

- In Toundoute, a rich cuticular flora dominated by fern and cycad leaflets were found along with wood debris resembling conifers of the families Pinaceae or Taxaceae.
- Top of the Azilal Formation at the Idemrane geosite, unidentified pieces of wood fossils of variable sizes were recovered (largest over 20 cm in length) showing traces of iron oxides, considered root fragments.
- At Mizaguène Hill (Azilal) lenticular marno-conglomeratic sandstone levels filled with plant remains are found, maybe derived from a lagoon.
- At Taquat N'Agrd the uppermost Tafraout Fm is capped by a +10 m succession of coal beds intercalated with limestones.
- North of Jbel Akenzoud and partly impregnated and/or carbonized by malachite.
- At Aguerd n'Igli the Tafraout Fm starts with sandstone marls with plants, and in upper sections includes bioclastic limestones-sandstones and green-yellow marls in color also rich in plant debris.
- At Tizi n-M'Barek a carbonate bar on top of marls with associated plant debris and bivalves.
- At Jebel Azourki and Jebel Toksine, woody plant debris, including shales with coal streaks, bioclastic limestones-sandstones rich in debris, charcoal and cuticle fragments suggests vegetation in a humid, marginal marine environment, maybe a salt marsh.
- At M'Semrir Pass, samples dominated by Pollen have been recovered in the Tafraout and Azilal Fms.

Genus/Family	Species	Location	Formation	Age	Material	Notes	Images
Cayeuxia	C. spp.	Aguerd N´Igli; Aguerd N´Wahmane; Jebel Toksine; La Cathédrale; Tizi n-M´Barek	Azilal; Tafraout	Toarcian-Aalenian	Imprints	Affinities with Halimedaceae or Udoteaceae family.	Modern Udotea
Codiaceae? indet.	Indeterminate	Aguerd N´Igli; Aguerd N´Wahmane; La Cathédrale; Tizi n-M´Barek	Azilal; Tafraout	Toarcian-Aalenian	Imprints	Can be misidentified Cayeuxia.	Modern Codium
Girvanella	G. sp.	La Cathédrale	Azilal; Tafraout	Toarcian-Aalenian	Imprints	Oscillatoriales?	
Ortonella	O. lemoineae	Assif Tafraout; Jbel Akenzoud	Azilal	Late Toarcian-Aalenian	Imprints	Affinities with Garwoodiaceae.	
Sarfatiella	S. dubari	Timghissine; Tizi n-M´Barek	Azilal; Tafraout	Toarcian-Aalenian	Imprints	Affinities with Dasycladaceae.	
Thaumatoporella	T. parvovesiculifera	Aguerd N´Wahmane	Azilal; Tafraout	Toarcian-Aalenian	Imprints	Affinities with Thaumatoporellales	

== See also ==
- Toarcian turnover
- Toarcian formations
  - Tagoudite Formation, SISTER UNIT, Morocco
  - Aganane Formation, Morocco
  - Calcaires du Bou Dahar, Morocco
  - Marne di Monte Serrone, Italy
  - Podpeč Limestone, Slovenia
  - El Pedregal Formation, Spain
  - Mizur Formation, North Caucasus
  - Sachrang Formation, Austria
  - Posidonia Shale, Lagerstätte in Germany
  - Irlbach Sandstone, Germany
  - Ciechocinek Formation, Germany and Poland
  - Krempachy Marl Formation, Poland and Slovakia
  - Djupadal Formation, Central Skane
  - Lava Formation, Lithuania
  - Whitby Mudstone, England
  - Fernie Formation, Alberta and British Columbia
    - Poker Chip Shale
  - Whiteaves Formation, British Columbia
  - Navajo Sandstone, Utah
  - Los Molles Formation, Argentina
  - Mawson Formation, Antarctica
  - Kandreho Formation, Madagascar
  - Kota Formation, India
  - Cattamarra Coal Measures, Australia
