= Zaouiat Ahansal =

- Rural commune and town
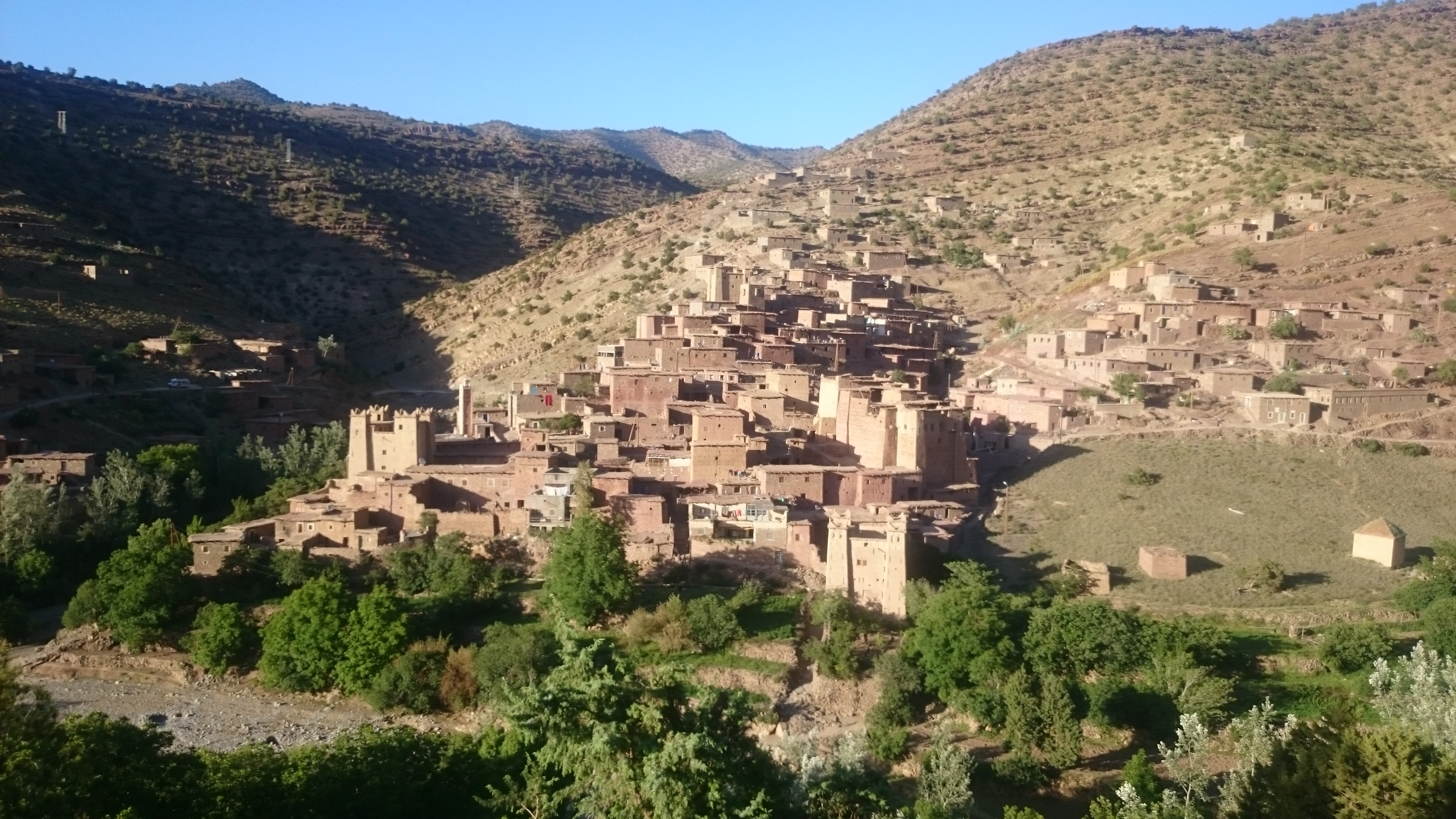
- Interactive map of Zaouiat Ahansal
- Coordinates: 31.833382°N 6.10663°W
- Country: Morocco
- Region: Tadla-Azilal
- Province: Azilal Province

Population (2004)
  - Total: 10,435
- Time zone: UTC+0 (GMT)

Zaouiat Ahansal is a small town and rural commune in Azilal Province of the Tadla-Azilal region of Morocco. At the time of the 2004 census, the commune had a total population of 10,435 people living in 1,554 households.

== Weekly Market ==
The weekly market that draws all the people of the area is held on Mondays near Zaouiat Ahansal.

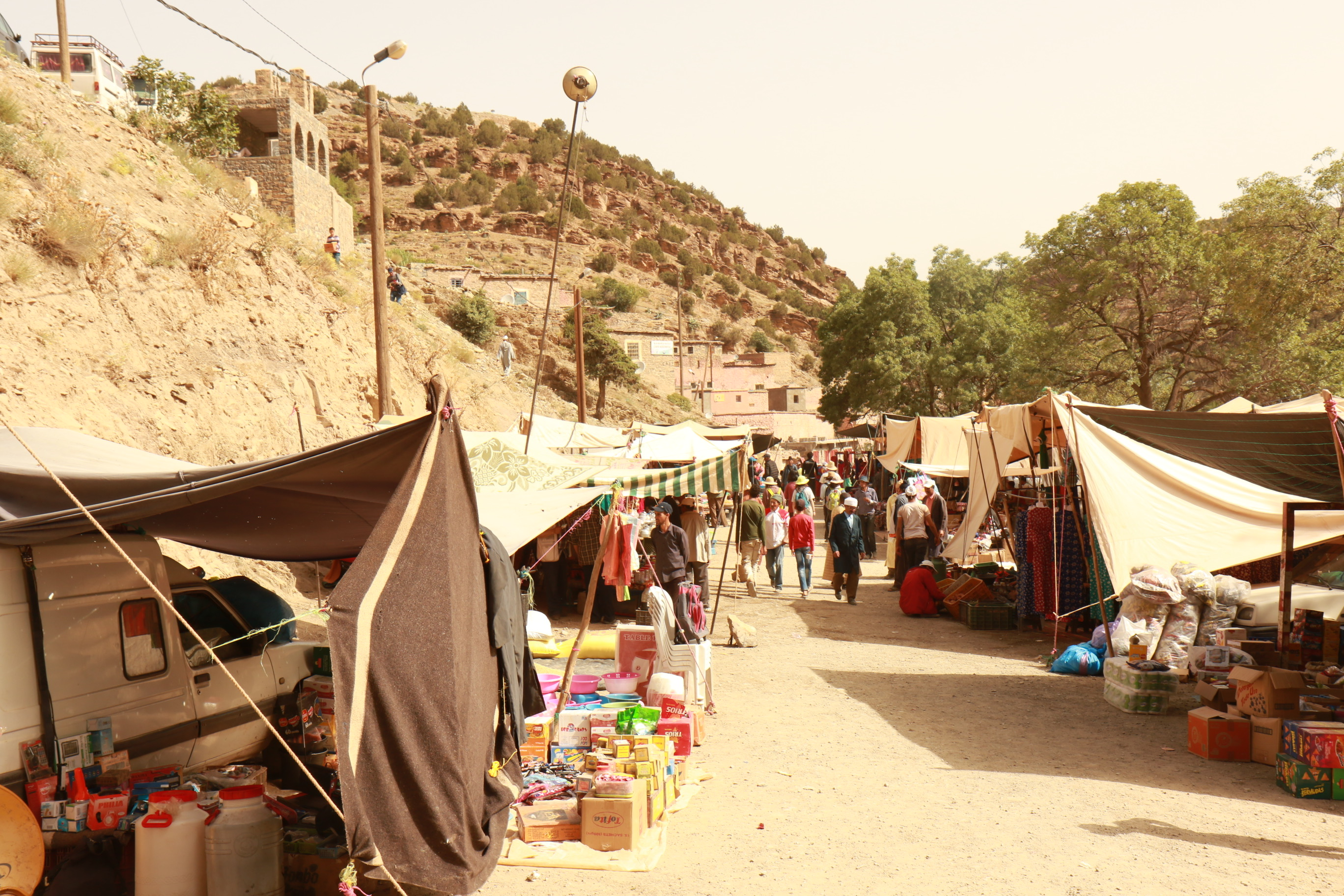
The Weekly Market held on Monday in Zawiya Ahansal in the Atlas Mountains in Morocco, June 2019

== NGOs ==
The Atlas Cultural Foundation and Les Amis de Amezray, based in France works closely with the people of Zaouiat Ahansal to provide developmental aid to the area.
