= Lumachelle =

Sedimentary rock made of shells

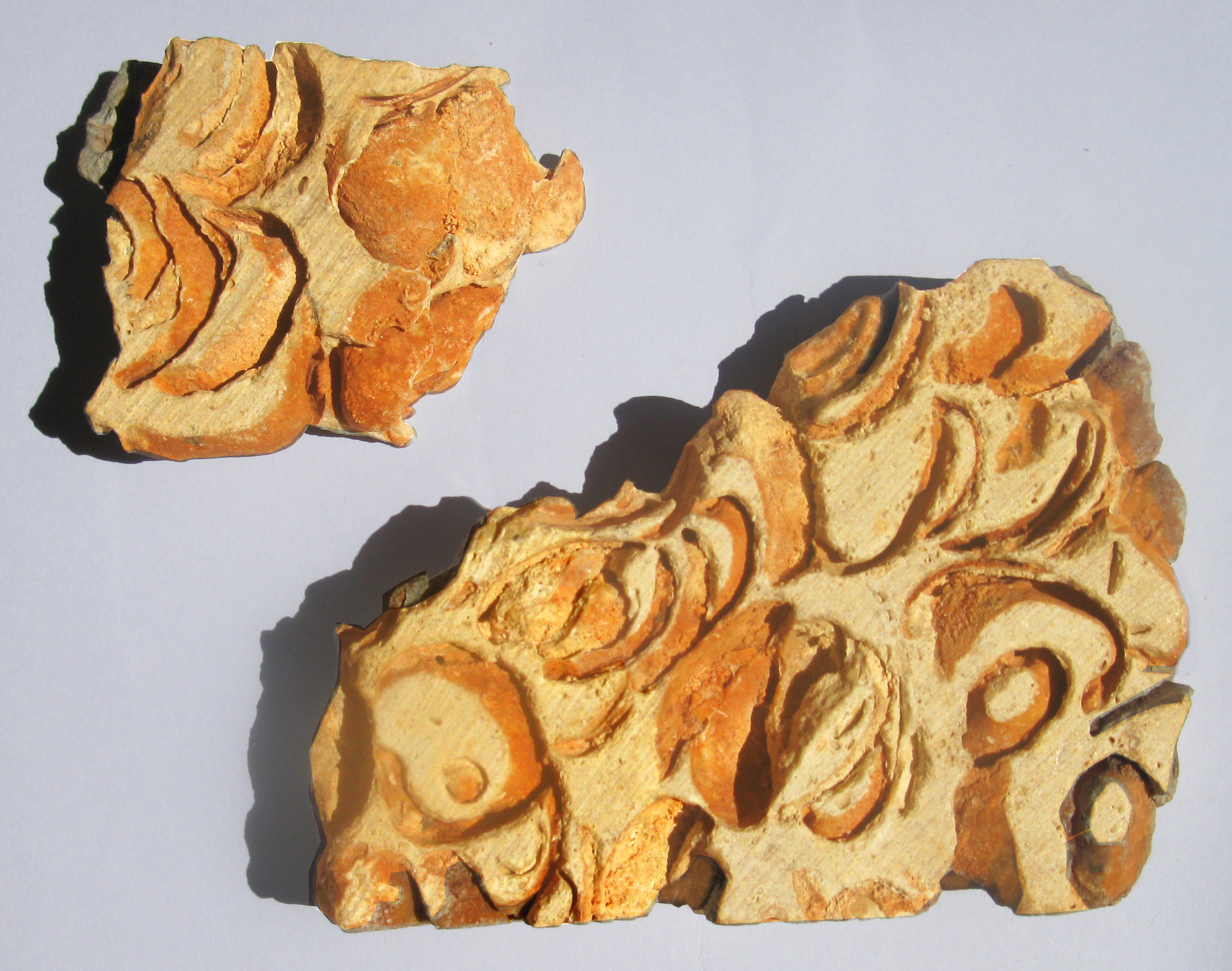
Lumachelle samples from the Miocene of France, containing abundant bivalve individuals

Lumachelle (also known as lumacell, lumachel, or "lumachella") is a sedimentary rock containing partial to complete bivalve fossils that were accumulated by sedimentation. It differs from coquina (another fossiliferous sedimentary rock) in fossil preservation, as coquinas are mainly composed of small fragments of broken and crushed shells. Lumachelles may or may not contain complete bivalves including the shell, or alternatively only internal molds. While the term is mostly used for bivalve accumulations, other hard-shelled organisms can be occasionally encountered, such as gastropods.

== Formation ==
Lumachelles can be originated when assambleages of organisms die in areas of high biological productivity, such as beaches, river deltas, or lagoons. After death, individuals are transported along with sediments and accumulate over time, hence becoming fossilized. During or after sedimentation the shells or carapaces may be dissolved or eroded away, producing internal molds.

== See also ==
- Fossil beach
- Fossiliferous limestone
- Limestone
- Lumachelle à Ostrea acuminata Formation
- Shelly limestone
