= Rhizolith =

Root systems encased in mineral matter

Rhizoliths are organosedimentary structures formed in soils or fossil soils (paleosols) by plant roots. They include root moulds, casts, and tubules, root petrifactions, and rhizocretions. Rhizoliths, and other distinctive modifications of carbonate soil texture by plant roots, are important for identifying paleosols in the post-Silurian geologic record. Rock units whose structure and fabric were established largely by the activity of plant roots are called rhizolites.

== Varieties of rhizoliths ==
Colin F. Klappa first proposed the term rhizolith for various organosedimentary structures produced by the activity of plant roots in 1980, and his terminology has since been widely adopted with some extensions.

=== Root moulds ===
Root moulds are tubular voids that preserve the shape of a root that has subsequently decayed away. Such voids will collapse unless the root penetrated soil that was already at least partially lithified. Closely packed, very thin root moulds give the sediments an alveolar texture.

=== Root casts ===
Sediments or minerals that fill a root mould and become cemented produce a root cast.

=== Root tubules ===
Root tubules are cemented cylinders around a root mould. The cement is typically calcite and is responsible for the preservation of root morphology in otherwise poorly consolidated sediments. Root tubules can form while the root is still alive or during its decay, and often take the form of fine, needle-like calcite crystals that preserve the root tubule after the root has completely decayed.

=== Root petrifactions ===
Root petrifactions are similar to petrified wood and are formed when minerals encrust, impregnate, or replace the organic matter of a plant root, sometimes preserving it in great detail. The replacement mineral is typically calcite. Cell walls are most commonly preserved, perhaps because calcium pectate is already present in the walls.

=== Rhizocretions ===
Rhizocretion is distinguished from petrifaction by the manner of formation. Petrifaction is defined as 'a process of fossilization whereby organic matter is converted into a stony substance by the infiltration of water containing dissolved inorganic matter, such as calcium carbonate and silica, which replaces the original organic material, sometimes retaining the original structure'. Thus root petrifaction is a process which involves replacement, impregnation, encrustation and void-filling of organic matter by mineral matter without total loss of root anatomical features. By contrast, rhizocretions which include rhizoliths, are created by the accumulation of mineral matter around roots. Accumulation, usually accompanied by cementation, may occur during life or death of plant roots.

=== Rhizohaloes ===
Rhizohaloes are zones of chemical reduction around decomposed plant roots. These typically appear as elongated gray mottles with reddish rims. They form when iron and manganese are reduced close to the root and the soluble reduced metals diffuse outwards. The metals are then oxidized again and deposited as hematite or goethite.

== Rhizoliths versus other tubular structures ==
Rhizoliths, like animal burrows, are commonly circular in cross-section and cylindrical in shape, and so the two can be confused. Rhizoliths vary in length from a few centimeters to several meters, while burrows are generally less than a meter long. However, animal burrows up to 9 metres (30 ft) have been found. The diameters of rhizoliths range from 0.1–20 millimetres (0.0039–0.7874 in), while the longest reported animal burrow had a width of 0.5 centimetres (0.20 in).

Rhizoliths can also be distinguished from animal burrows by their branching pattern and orientation. Roots become narrower as they branch, as do the rhizoliths they produce. Branching animal burrows are usually uniform in diameter out to the furthest branches. Roots branch horizontally or vertically, while animal burrows are characteristically horizontal, inclined, or vertical. Rhizolithis are characteristic of terrestrial sediments while animal burrows are more often found in marine beds.

Rhizoliths can also be confused with stem moulds formed in playas. However, stem moulds can be distinguished their lack of root-like branching and by chemical or microscopic features.

== Creation of rhizoliths ==
Plant roots normally remove calcium from soil while lowering its pH, by exchanging H^{+} ions for Ca^{2+}, Mg^{2+}, K^{+}, and other cations. This contributes to the ability of roots to bore through rock, but it works against precipitation of calcite around roots. Several explanations have been offered for how rhizoliths are nonetheless able to form.

One possibility is that some plant roots take up more anions than cations, maintaining charge balance by secreting HCO_{3}^{−} ions rather than H^{+} ions. In so doing, the pH of the surrounding soil is raised, rather than lowered. This may trigger precipitation of calcium carbonate around roots, this leading to the formation of rhizocretions. The greater uptake of water than calcium by roots also increases the saturation of calcium carbonate.

Other possibilities include the excretion of organic acids by plant roots; the presence of symbiotic bacteria, fungi, or algae that precipitate calcium carbonate; or exclusion of calcium from roots. The first seems most likely.

== Occurrence ==
Rhizoliths are important for identifying paleosols in the geologic record. However, they are limited to post-Silurian beds, since vascular plants with extensive root systems did not flourish until this time.

Both hematite-rimmed rhizohaloes and calcareous rhizoliths are found in moderately well-drained red paleosols. More poorly drained purple paleosols contain rhizohaloes rimmed with goethite, while the most poorly drained paleosols root tubules composed of tiny black iron-manganese spheres, sometimes in association with jarosite. Conditions of water saturation in paleosols can thus be inferred from the mineralogy of rhizoliths.

Unusual rhizoliths from the Lower Cretaceous have provided evidence of the earliest activity of social termites.

== Photo gallery ==
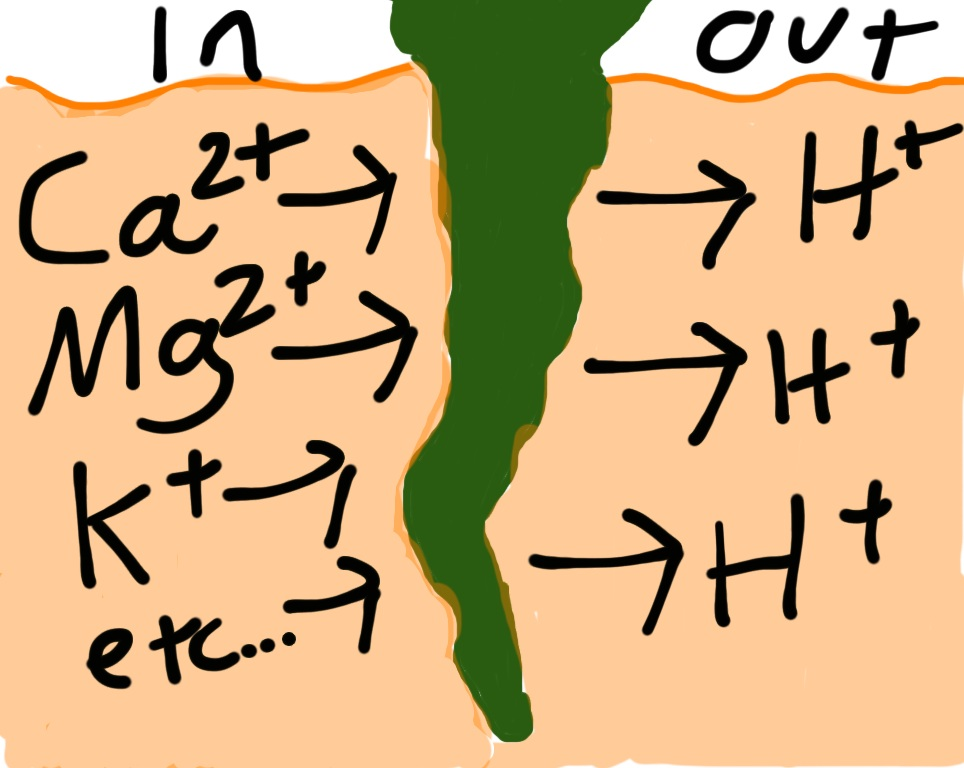
Normal root

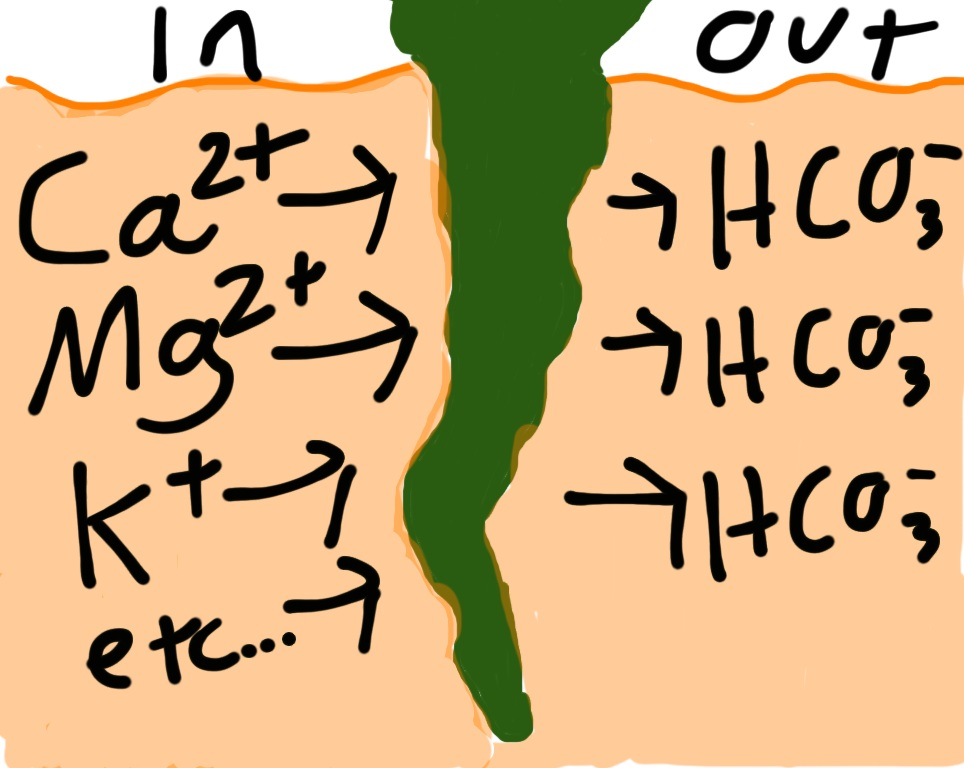
Rhizocreation

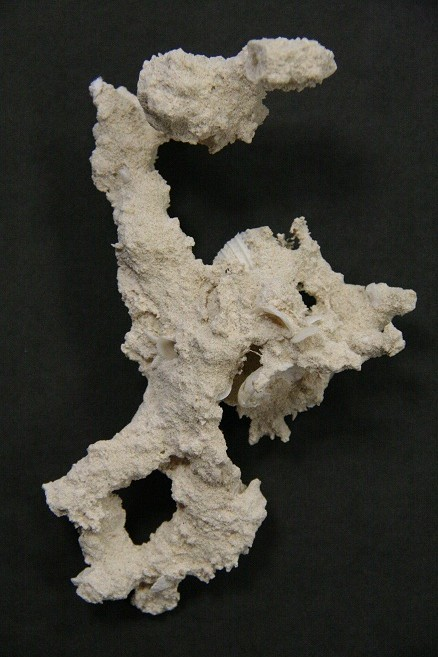
Rhizolith sample, Late Galasian Limestone ~1.5 MA, Rio Lagartos, Yucatán Peninsula

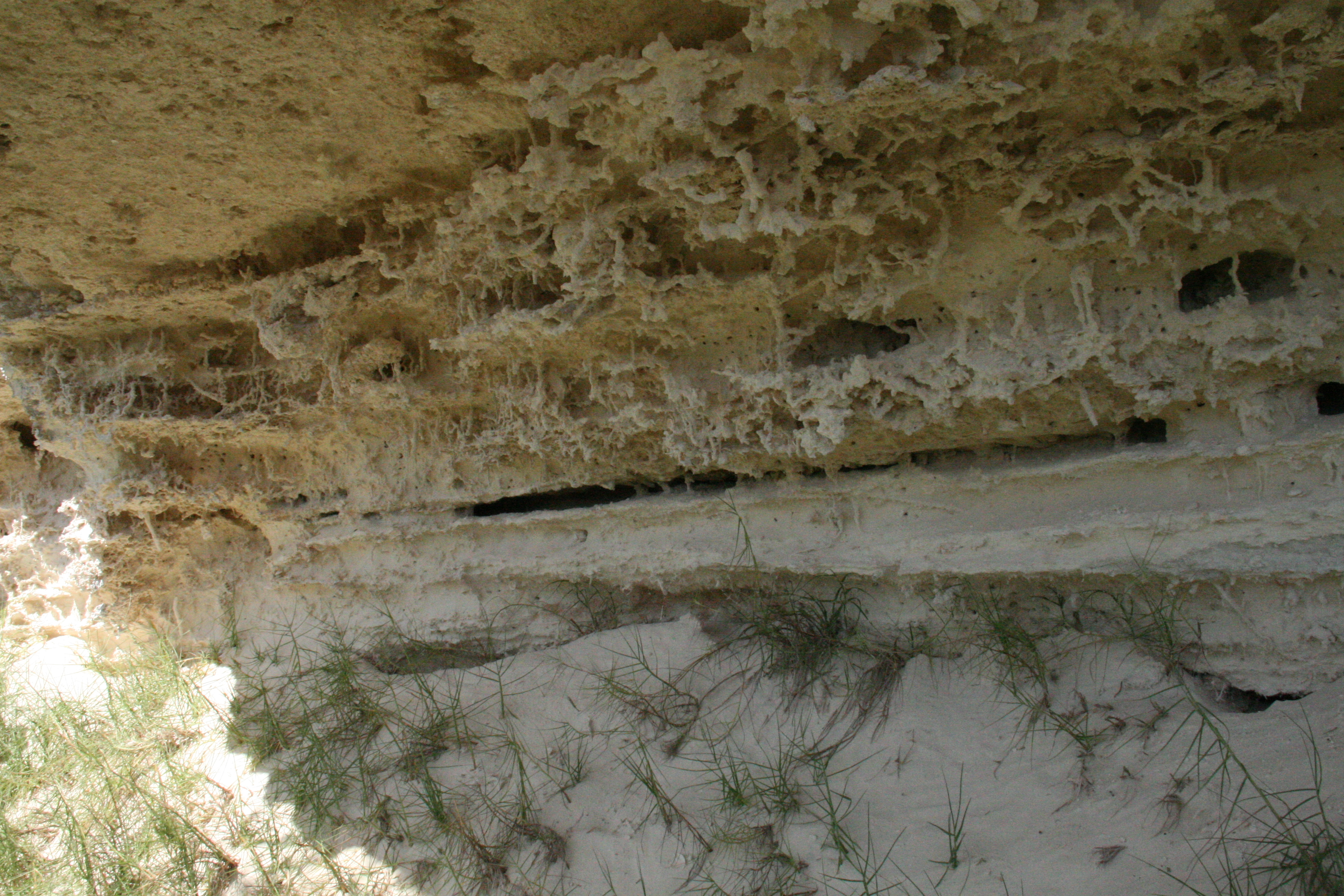
Rhizolith group revealed after wind erosion 1, Late Galasian Limestone ~1.5 MA, Rio Lagartos, Yucatán Peninsula

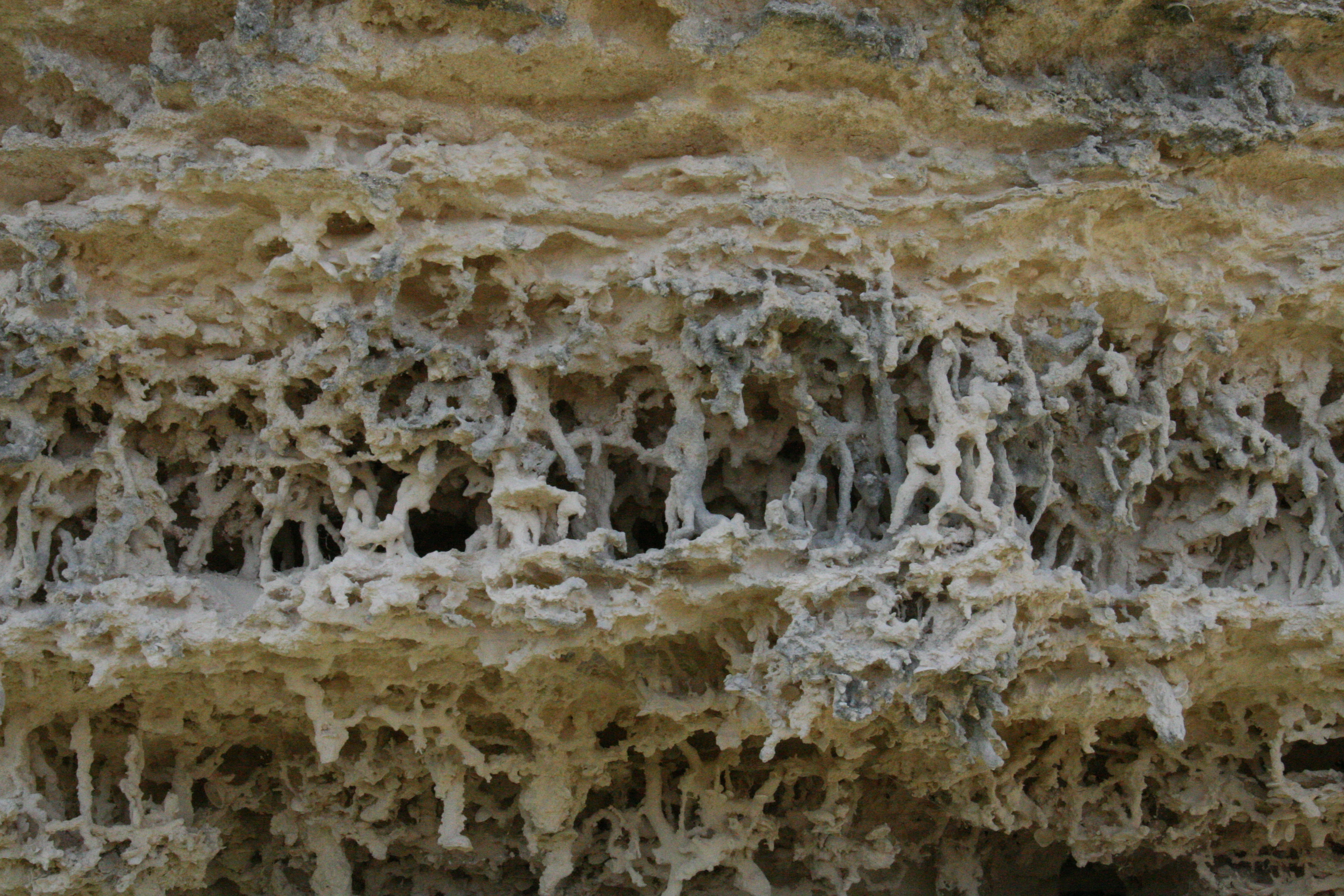
Rhizolith group revealed after wind erosion 4, Late Galasian Limestone ~1.5 MA, Rio Lagartos, Yucatán Peninsula

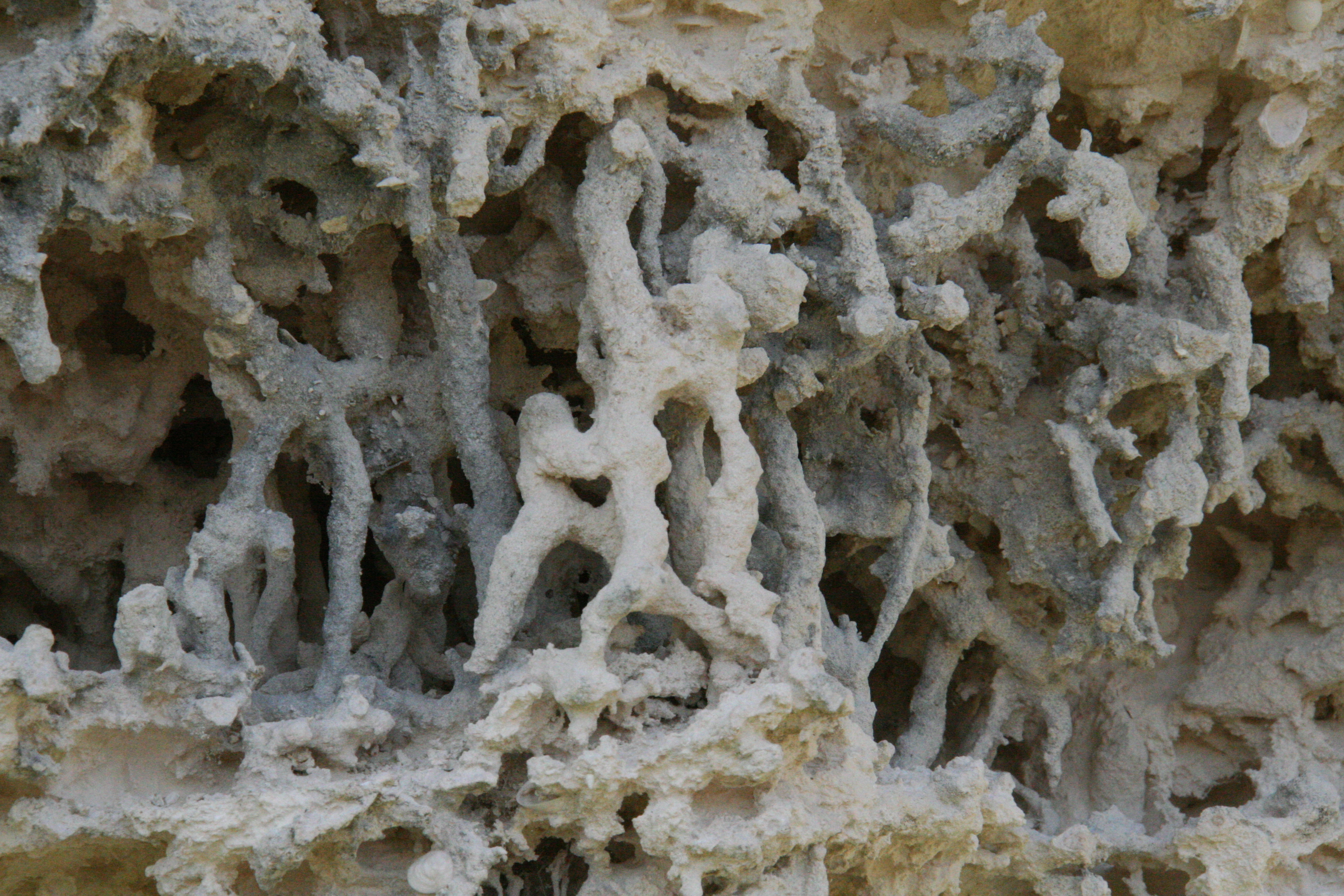
Rhizolith group revealed after wind erosion 3, Late Galasian Limestone ~1.5 MA, Rio Lagartos, Yucatán Peninsula

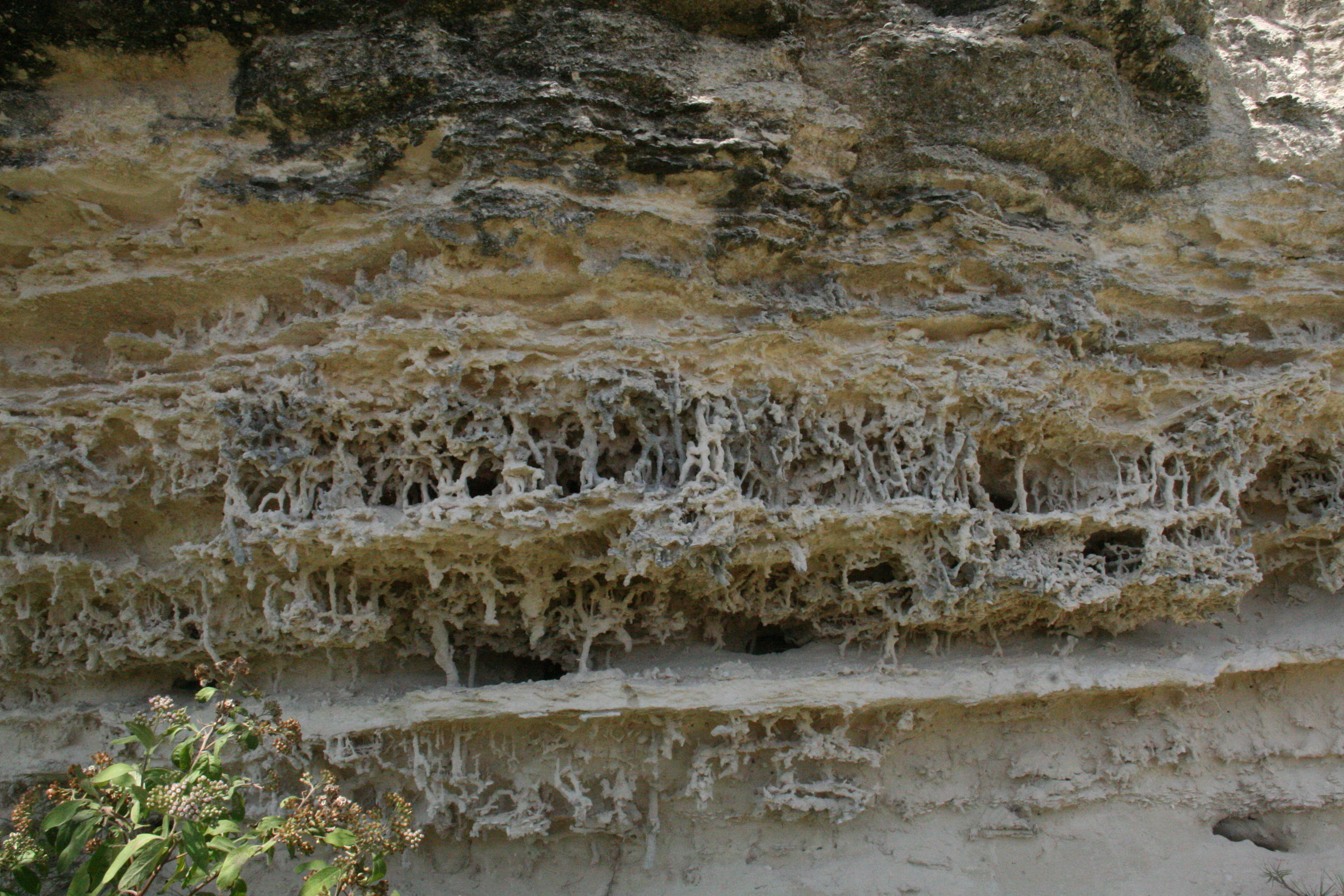
Rhizolith group revealed after wind erosion 2, Late Galasian Limestone ~1.5 MA, Rio Lagartos, Yucatán Peninsula

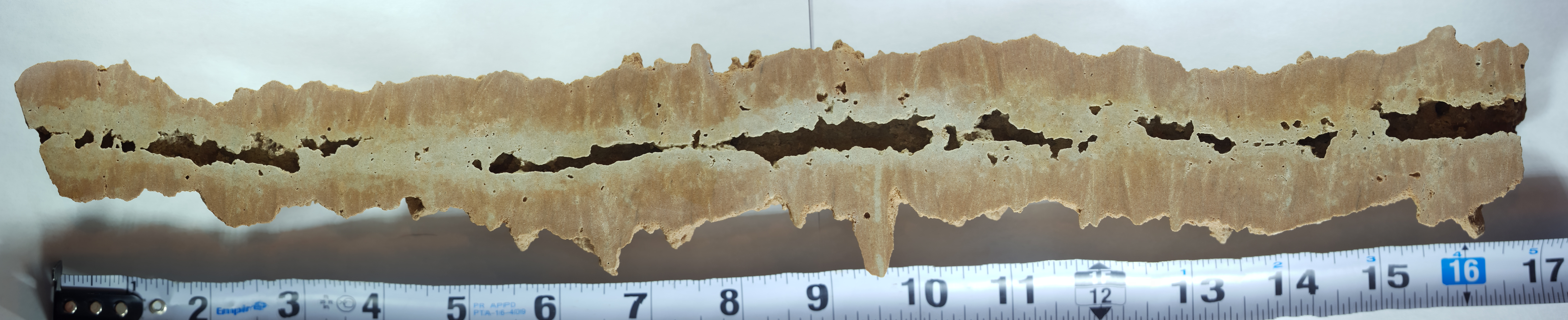
Exceptional Pleistocene ~10,000 yr rhizolith from Austin County, Texas

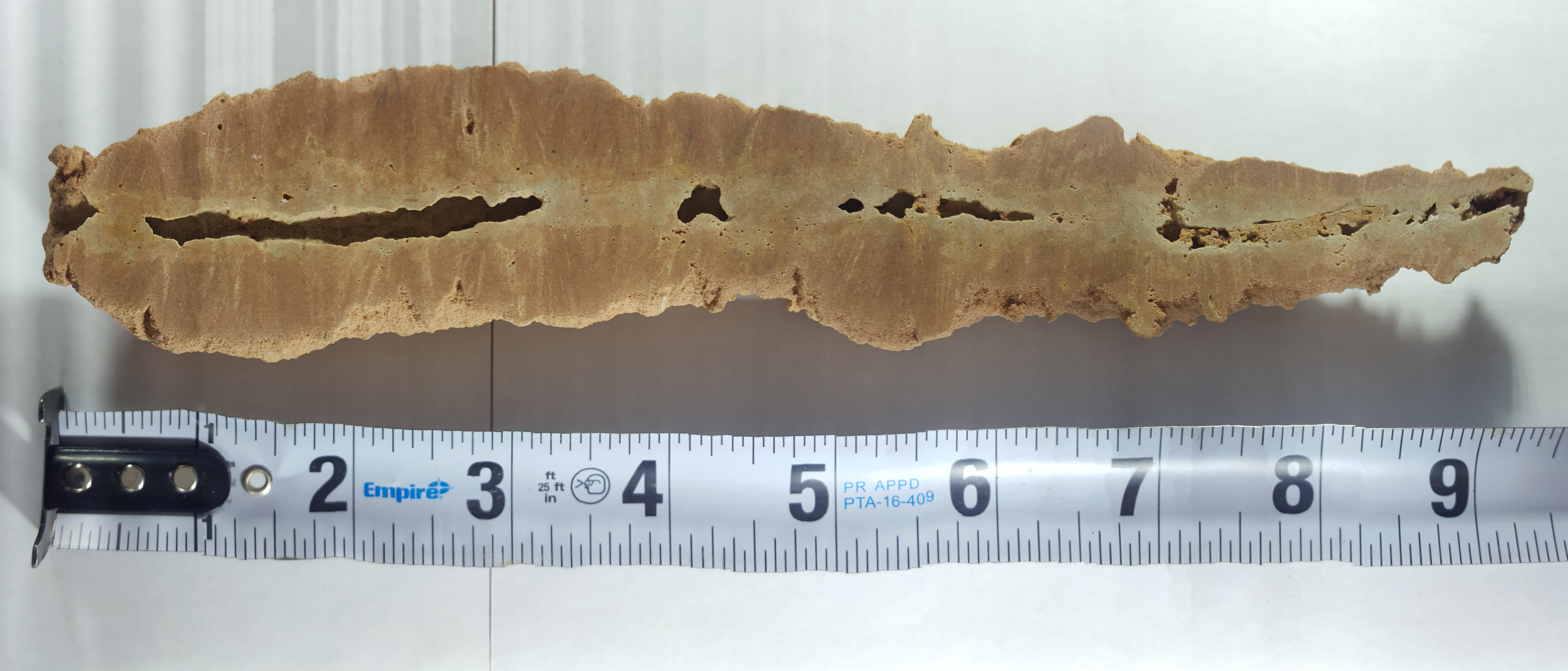
Exceptional Pleistocene ~10,000 yr rhizolith from Austin County, Texas
